= Grade II* listed buildings in Anglesey =

Anglesey shown within Wales

In the United Kingdom, the term listed building refers to a building or other structure officially designated as being of special architectural, historical, or cultural significance; Grade II* structures are those considered to be "particularly important buildings of more than special interest". Listing was begun by a provision in the Town and Country Planning Act 1947. Once listed, strict limitations are imposed on the modifications allowed to a building's structure or fittings. In Wales, the authority for listing under the Planning (Listed Buildings and Conservation Areas) Act 1990 rests with Cadw.

== Buildings ==
Name	Location Grid Ref. (Note: Sometimes known as OSGB36, the grid reference is based on the British national grid reference system used by the Ordnance Survey.) Geo-coordinates	Date Listed	Function	Notes	Reference Number	Image
Presaddfed Hall	Bodedern; SH3506580951; 53°17′59″N 4°28′35″W	8 January 1952	Country house	Located 1.5km ENE of Bodedern, near the S tip of Llyn Llywenan. Reached via a single track driveway.	5262	See more images
Melin Llynon	Tref Alaw; SH3405285229; 53°20′16″N 4°29′38″W	8 January 1952	Windmill	Set back from the N side of a country road leading W from the village of Llanddeusant, the mill is located c500m W of the Church of St Marcellus and St Marcellinus.	5265	See more images
Carreglwyd	Llanfaethlu; SH3085887774; 53°21′35″N 4°32′35″W	8 January 1952	House	In an isolated location set within park and woodland. The house forms the centre to the Carreglwyd estate and is set back from the N and E sides of the Porth Swtan road, leading NE off the A5025.	5267	See more images
St Beuno's Church	Aberffraw; SH3533168802; 53°11′27″N 4°27′58″W	4 May 1971	Church	Located within an enclosed churchyard, set back from the S side of Church Street, in the SW part of Aberffraw.	5270	See more images
St Cwyfan's Church	Porth Cwyfan, Aberffraw; SH3359368280; 53°11′08″N 4°29′31″W	4 May 1971	Church	In an isolated location on an island c. 150m off the coast at Porth Cwyfan and reached by a rough causeway at low tide; the churchyard has been raised and is enclosed by a retaining rubble wall.	5273	See more images
St Edern's Church	Bodedern; SH3335080450; 53°17′41″N 4°30′07″W	4 May 1971	Church	Situated on the N side of Church Street in the centre of the village of Bodedern.	5276	See more images
St Twrog's Church	Bodffordd; SH4002277640; 53°16′18″N 4°24′02″W	4 May 1971	Church	In an isolated rural location within an irregularly shaped churchyard along the NW side of a country road running SW from the B5109 at Llynfaes.	5279	See more images
St Maethlu's Church	Llanfaethlu; SH3126087084; 53°21′13″N 4°32′12″W	4 May 1971	Church	Set back from the NE side of the Porth Swtan road, leading NE off the A5025 through the village of Llanfaethlu.	5301	See more images
Old Church of St Afran, St Ieuan and St Sannan	Tref Alaw; SH3495184062; 53°19′40″N 4°28′47″W	4 May 1971	Church	In an isolated rural location set within a sub-rectangular churchyard W of the farmstead at Ty-mawr. Set well back from the SW side of a country road, the church is located c1.5km NW of the new church in Llantrisant.	5314	See more images
Melin Hywel	Tref Alaw; SH3507784476; 53°19′53″N 4°28′41″W	4 May 1971	Mill	Set back from the N side of the country road between the villages of Llanddeusant and Llantrisant, the mill is located c950m SE of the Church of St Marcellus and St Marcellinus in the village of Llanddeusant.	5317	See more images
St Peulan's Church	Bryngwran; SH3725075480; 53°15′05″N 4°26′27″W	4 May 1971	Church	In an isolated rural location, within an irregularly shaped churchyard at the end of a raised trackway W of a country road between the A5(T) and Dothan. Located c. 1.75km SW of Gwalchmai and c. 3km SE of Bryngwran.	5320	See more images
St Morhaiarn's Church	Gwalchmai, Trewalchmai; SH3904676110; 53°15′27″N 4°24′52″W	4 May 1971	Church	Located within an enclosed churchyard, at the end of a single track lane leading off the S side of the A5(T) Holyhead Road, at the W end of the village of Gwalchmai.	5331	See more images
Plas Bodewryd	Bodewryd, Mechell; SH4001390822; 53°23′24″N 4°24′26″W	9 February 1952	Hall	Set back from the NE side of the country road in the rural hamlet of Bodewryd, c3km ESE of Llanfechell. Plas Bodewryd lies c200m due N of the Church of St Mary.	5334	See more images
Glyn	Llanfair-Mathafarn-Eithaf; SH5154281332; 53°18′29″N 4°13′47″W	9 February 1952	House	In an isolated rural location at the end of a private driveway off a country road, which leads W off the A5025 to the S of Benllech.	5339	Upload Photo
Tre'r Ddôl	Tref Alaw; SH3916781176; 53°18′11″N 4°24′54″W	9 February 1952	House	In an isolated rural location, reached by private trackway leading N of a country road W of Llechcynfarwy; the house is located c1km ENE of the Church of St Cynfarwy	5345	Tre'r Ddôl
St Pabo's Church	Llanbabo, Tref Alaw; SH3780586773; 53°21′10″N 4°26′18″W	5 December 1970	Church	Set within a circular churchyard at the SE side of a country road between Llechcynfarwy and Carreglefn.	5354	See more images
St Padrig's Church	Cemaes Bay, Llanbadrig; SH3761094640; 53°25′25″N 4°26′43″W	5 December 1970	Church	In an isolated coastal location NW of the village of Cemaes Bay. The church is reached by a country road leading N off the A5025 E of Cemaes Bay.	5356	See more images
St Dyfnan's Church	Llanddyfnan; SH5026978706; 53°17′03″N 4°14′51″W	5 December 1970	Church	In a rural location, set back from the N side of the B5109; NE of Talwrn and W of Pentraeth.	5358	See more images
St Tyfrydog's Church	Llandyfrydog, Rhosybol; SH4435485355; 53°20′32″N 4°20′22″W	5 December 1970	Church	Located within a circular churchyard to W side of Lon Leidr in the centre of the small hamlet of Llandyfrydog.	5360	See more images
St Gwenllwyfo's Church	Llanwenllwyfo, Llaneilian; SH4771789330; 53°22′44″N 4°17′27″W	5 December 1970	Church	Set back, within an irregularly shaped churchyard, from the W side of a country road between Nebo and Traeth Dulas; to the SW of the former Llys Dulas estate.	5370	See more images
St Eugrad's Church	Parciau, Llaneugrad; SH4955084166; 53°19′59″N 4°15′39″W	5 December 1970	Church	In an isolated rural location within an oval churchyard set back from the SW side of a lane leading to the house and home farm at Parciau, W of Marian glas.	5372	See more images
Parciau dovecote	Parciau, Llaneugrad; SH4975983930; 53°19′51″N 4°15′27″W	5 December 1970	Dovecote	In an isolated rural location, set back from the W side of the lane leading to the house and home farm at Parciau; to W of Marian glas	5373	See more images
St Peter's Church	Llanbedrgoch, Llanfair-Mathafarn-Eithaf; SH5093979855; 53°17′41″N 4°14′17″W	5 December 1970	Church	In an isolated rural location, set back from the W side of a country road which leads N of the A5025 to the village of Llanbedrgoch.	5374	See more images
St Mary's Church	Llanfair Mathafarn Eithaf; SH5066682892; 53°19′19″N 4°14′36″W	5 December 1970	Church	Slightly set back and at right angles to the E side of country road leading off the B5110 to the NE of the village of Brynteg.	5375	See more images
Caerau	Llanfairynghornwy, Cylch-y-Garn; SH3204291753; 53°23′45″N 4°31′39″W	5 December 1970	House	In an isolated rural location set back from the W side of the country road between Llanfairynghornwy and Cemlyn; c750m NW of the Church of St Mary at Llanfairynghornwy.	5381	Upload Photo
St Rhwydrus's Church	Cylch-y-Garn; SH3221093224; 53°24′33″N 4°31′33″W	5 December 1970	Church	In an isolated rural location near the coast at Cemlyn. The churchyard is reached via a trackway leading SW from the farmtrack to Tyn Llan farm, and then via a footpath across a field.	5382	See more images
St Mechell's Church	Mechell; SH3694291273; 53°23′35″N 4°27′13″W	5 December 1970	Church	Set within an irregularly shaped churchyard at the N side of the crossroads in the centre of the village of Llanfechell.	5383	See more images
St Cwyllog's Church	Llangwyllog, Llanddyfnan; SH4338379668; 53°17′27″N 4°21′04″W	5 December 1970	Church	In a rural location NNW of the small hamlet of Llangwllog, along a narrow lane leading SW off the B5111.	5394	See more images
St Michael's Church	Penrhos Lligwy, Moelfre; SH4805785920; 53°20′54″N 4°17′03″W	5 December 1970	Church	In a rural location set back from the S side of a country road leading S from the village of Brynrefail towards Mynydd Bodafon; located S of the junction with another country road leading W.	5398	See more images
St Caian's Church	Tregaian, Llanddyfnan; SH4513079706; 53°17′30″N 4°19′30″W	5 December 1970	Church	Within a rectangular churchyard at the W side of the B5111 in the centre of the small hamlet of Tregaian.	5403	See more images
St Tysilio's Church	Llandysilio, Menai Bridge; SH5513871688; 53°13′21″N 4°10′17″W	14 February 1967	Church	Located towards the south end of Church Island to the west of Menai Bridge. The island is reached by a causeway and the churchyard is enclosed by a low rubble wall with wrought iron gates at the entrance at the end of the causeway.	5405	See more images
The Cambria	Menai Bridge; SH5568971648; 53°13′20″N 4°09′47″W	14 February 1967	House	Near the foot of Menai Bridge on the E side, overlooking the Menai Straits, on the NW side of Cambria Road, leading from Beach Road.	5406	The Cambria
St Eleth's Church	Amlwch; SH4422492950; 53°24′37″N 4°20′42″W	25 October 1951	Church	Set back, within an irregularly shaped churchyard, from the E side of Queen Street in the centre of the town of Amlwch.	5427	See more images
Aberbraint	Llanfair Pwllgwyngyll; SH5268571264; 53°13′05″N 4°12′28″W	2 May 1952	House	Set back from the road within grounds on the NW side of the A4080 Brynsiencyn Road, c.0.5km from the Llanfairpwll Toll House.	5430	Upload Photo
Marquess of Anglesey's Column	Llanfair Pwllgwyngyll; SH5343271563; 53°13′15″N 4°11′48″W	2 May 1952	Monument	Prominently sited on a hill called Cerrig y Borth overlooking the Menai Strait, N of the A4080(T) Holyhead road, on the approach to Llanfairpwll.	5432	See more images
Dinam	Rhosyr; SH4532968950; 53°11′42″N 4°19′00″W	2 May 1952	House	Located at the end of a private driveway off the SE side of the B4419, NE of Llangaffo and c800m NE of the Church of St Caffo.	5434	Upload Photo
Tros-y-marian	Llangoed; SH6110881147; 53°18′32″N 4°05′10″W	2 May 1952	House	Set back, within private grounds, from the N side of a country road running between Penmon and Glan-yr-afon, N of the village of Llangoed; c0.6km N of the Church of St Cawdraf.	5436	Tros-y-marian
Eirianallt	Llangoed; SH6062880928; 53°18′25″N 4°05′35″W	2 May 1952	House	Set back, and below, the S side of a country road running between Penmon and Glan-yr-afon, to the N of the village of Llangoed; c0.6km NW of the Church of St Cawdraf.	5438	Upload Photo
Henblas	Llangristiolus; SH4227272538; 53°13′35″N 4°21′51″W	2 May 1952	House	In private grounds, set back, along a driveway, from the SE side of the B4422. The house lies c2.5km SW of the church of St. Cristiolus.	5439	Upload Photo
Plas Penmynydd	Penmynydd; SH4959175199; 53°15′09″N 4°15′21″W	2 May 1952	House	In an isolated rural location, set back from the N side of the B5420 NW of Penmynydd.	5447	Upload Photo
No 1 Lewis Rogers Almshouses	Penmynydd; SH5136174239; 53°14′40″N 4°13′44″W	2 May 1952	Almshouses	Set at right angles to the S side of the B5420 in the centre of the village of Penmynydd; No 1 is located nearest the road, at the N (R) end of the range.	5448	No 1 Lewis Rogers Almshouses
Plas Gwyn	Pentraeth; SH5285478182; 53°16′49″N 4°12′30″W	2 May 1952	House	Set back, within private grounds, between the A5025 and the B5109 SW of Pentraeth.	5450	Upload Photo
Tŷ Fry	Pentraeth; SH5162876755; 53°16′01″N 4°13′34″W	2 May 1952	House	Set back, within private grounds, from the NW side of a country road leading W off the A5025 through the small hamlet of Rhoscefnhir.	5451	Upload Photo
Priory House	Llangoed; SH6303380717; 53°18′20″N 4°03′25″W	14 November 1968	Priory	Slightly set back from the N side of a country road leading to the SE tip of the island at Black Point, or Trwyn Du, Penmon. The Priory House forms the W side of a cloister yard; linking the Church to the N and the refectory to the S.	5454	Priory House
Plas Berw with courtyard and walls	Llanfihangel Ysgeifiog; SH4657271768; 53°13′15″N 4°17′58″W	30 January 1968	House	In an isolated location, at the end of a single track lane, NW of the B4419, and c1.3km WSW of the Church of St Michael (new church) in Gaerwen.	5500	Upload Photo
Bodorgan	Bodorgan; SH3859367371; 53°10′44″N 4°25′00″W	30 January 1968	House	Located in the heart of private estate grounds at the W side of, and overlooking, the Malltraeth estuary. Formal terraced garden to E. The house lies c. 3.5km SE of Aberffraw and c. 1.5km S of the A4080 at Hermon.	5502	Upload Photo
St Mary's Church	Llanfair-yn-y-Cwmwd, Rhosyr; SH4470266764; 53°10′31″N 4°19′30″W	30 January 1968	Church	Set within an enclosed churchyard, set back from the NW side of a country lane running NE from the A4080; c1.2km NE of the Church of St Ceinwen and c1km N of Dwyran.	5513	See more images
Castell Aberlleiniog	Llangoed; SH6164079307; 53°17′33″N 4°04′38″W	30 January 1968	House	In an isolated location, along a trackway, to the N and W of a country road leading to Penmon; to the W of the village of Llangoed. The structure is to the N side of the Afon Lleiniog c0.5km from the coast.	5523	See more images
St Cristiolus's Church	Llangristiolus; SH4500273568; 53°14′11″N 4°19′26″W	30 January 1968	Church	In an elevated position overlooking, and set back from, the SE side of the A5(T).	5530	See more images
Old Church of St Nidan	Llanidan; SH4949566903; 53°10′40″N 4°15′13″W	30 January 1968	Church	Set within a stone walled circular churchyard, 20m N of Llanidan House, and c750m SE of the new Church of St. Nidan.	5538	See more images
Llanidan Hall	Llanidan; SH4949366874; 53°10′39″N 4°15′13″W	30 January 1968	Hall	Located 20m S of the Church of St. Nidan (old church), c1.2 km E of Brynsiencyn, set within a boundary wall.	5540	Upload Photo
St Michael's Church	Llanddona; SH5880281508; 53°18′42″N 4°07′15″W	30 January 1968	Church	In an isolated rural location under the E slopes of Bwrdd Arthur, to NE of Llanddona.	5544	See more images
St Iestyn's Church	Llaniestyn, Llanddona; SH5849979594; 53°17′40″N 4°07′28″W	30 January 1968	Church	In an isolated rural location, set back from a country lane leading E out of the village of Llanddona.	5545	See more images
St Sadwrn's Church	Llansadwrn, Cwm Cadnant; SH5538975877; 53°15′36″N 4°10′10″W	30 January 1968	Church	Set back from the E side of the road through the village of Llansadwrn.	5548	See more images
St Peter's Church	Newborough, Rhosyr; SH4199165470; 53°09′46″N 4°21′54″W	30 January 1968	Church	Set back from the road, within an enclosed churchyard, at the west side of the village.	5553	See more images
St Gredifael's Church	Penmynydd; SH5172074971; 53°15′04″N 4°13′26″W	30 January 1968	Church	Set back from the E side of the junction between two country roads to the N of the village of Penmynydd.	5555	See more images
St Beuno's Church	Trefdraeth, Bodorgan; SH4086170394; 53°12′24″N 4°23′03″W	30 January 1968	Church	Located in the centre of the small hamlet of Trefdraeth; set back from the N side of the road leading E from Bethel.	5564	See more images
Red Hill	Beaumaris; SH5921475920; 53°15′42″N 4°06′44″W	23 September 1950	House	Reached by private drive on the S side of the B5109 approximately 1.5km W of Beaumaris town centre.	5575	Upload Photo
Beaumaris Courthouse	Beaumaris; SH6069676154; 53°15′51″N 4°05′24″W	23 September 1950	Courthouse	On the E side of Mona Place directly opposite Beaumaris Castle.	5581	Beaumaris Courthouse
Ye Olde Bull's Head Inn including attached rear range	Beaumaris; SH6058876107; 53°15′49″N 4°05′30″W	23 September 1950	Inn	On the corner of Castle Street and Rating Row.	5601	Ye Olde Bull's Head Inn including attached rear range
Tudor Rose	Beaumaris; SH6054976073; 53°15′48″N 4°05′32″W	23 September 1950	House	Fronting the street in a block of buildings between Church Street and Rating Row.	5605	See more images
Bishopsgate Hotel & Restaurant	Beaumaris; SH6045275990; 53°15′45″N 4°05′37″W	23 September 1950	Hotel	On the corner of Castle Street and Steeple Lane.	5611	See more images
Liverpool Arms Hotel	Beaumaris; SH6044175982; 53°15′45″N 4°05′38″W	23 September 1950	Hotel	Fronting the street in the block of buildings near the W end of Castle Street between Gadlys Lane and Steeple Lane.	5612	See more images
George and Dragon Hotel	Beaumaris; SH6052476070; 53°15′48″N 4°05′33″W	23 September 1950	Hotel	Fronting the street and set back from the junction with Castle Street.	5617	See more images
Royal Anglesey Yacht Club 6–7 Green Edge	Beaumaris; SH6074676137; 53°15′50″N 4°05′21″W	23 September 1950	Yacht Club	At the E end of the terrace, with its front facing NE in view of the castle.	5635	Royal Anglesey Yacht Club 6–7 Green Edge
Baron Hill	Beaumaris; SH5982776527; 53°16′02″N 4°06′12″W	23 September 1950	House	In extensive grounds although now obscured by woodland, in a prominent position overlooking Beaumaris Castle, approximately 0.9km NW of Beaumaris town centre, on the N side of the B5109.	5694	See more images
Holyhead Breakwater, Soldier's Point	Holyhead; SH2451984185; 53°19′31″N 4°38′11″W	19 July 1988	Breakwater	2.4km long Z-plan breakwater that stretches into Holyhead bay from Soldier’s Point, NW of town centre.	5743	See more images
Capel Ebeneser and chapel house (formerly Capel Cildwrn)	Llangefni; SH4517075998; 53°15′30″N 4°19′21″W	18 October 1988	Chapel	Located at the brow of a hill at the W end of Llangefni, set at right angles to the N side of Ffordd Cildwrn with graveyard to front; c.600m W of the church of St. Cyngar.	5749	Capel Ebeneser and chapel house (formerly Capel Cildwrn)
Moriah Calvinistic Methodist Chapel including forecourt wall and gates	Llangefni; SH4592575557; 53°15′17″N 4°18′40″W	16 June 1989	Chapel	Set back, behind a railed forecourt, from the E side of the A5114 Glanhwfa Road. The chapel is located directly N of the Shire Hall and is c.400m SSE of the church of St. Cyngar.	5751	See more images
Tros-y-gors	Llangoed; SH6110079480; 53°17′39″N 4°05′08″W	2 March 1992	House	Situated to E of B 5109 through Llangoed; reached from N end of the village along lane and then short private track. Faces N; rubble forecourt wall.	5761	Upload Photo
Kingsland Windmill, Mill Road (South side)	Holyhead; SH2485281063; 53°17′51″N 4°37′47″W	8 January 1952	Windmill	Prominent building set within a modern housing estate reached W off B4545 approximately 1km south of Holyhead town centre.	5762	Kingsland Windmill, Mill Road (South side)
Harbour Office, Salt Island	Holyhead; SH2522982947; 53°18′52″N 4°37′30″W	3 November 1993	Office	Situated within the security zone of the Port of Holyhead, adjacent to the Customs House.	5772	Harbour Office, Salt Island
George IV Arch, Salt Island	Holyhead; SH2524482909; 53°18′51″N 4°37′29″W	3 November 1993	Arch	Situated within the security zone of the Port of Holyhead.	5773	See more images
Skerries Lighthouse with associated buildings and enclosure walls	Cylch-y-Garn; SH2677394768; 53°25′16″N 4°36′30″W	29 March 1996	Lighthouse	Towards the S end of The Skerries Islands, at their highest point. 11.5km N of Holyhead.	18028	See more images
Detached former Keeper's Dwelling at Skerries Lighthouse	Cylch-y-Garn; SH2675594788; 53°25′17″N 4°36′31″W	29 March 1996	House	On low ground N of the lighthouse.	18029	Upload Photo
Capel Mawr Presbyterian Chapel	Menai Bridge; SH5569471803; 53°13′25″N 4°09′47″W	18 July 1997	Chapel	Prominently sited on the corner of Chapel Street and New Street.	18556	Capel Mawr Presbyterian Chapel
Plas Coch	Llandaniel Fab; SH5117068440; 53°11′32″N 4°13′45″W	23 April 1998	House	Standing in parkland 600m NW of the parish church of St. Edwen.	19736	Upload Photo
St Ceinwen's Church	Llangeinwen, Rhosyr; SH4397065820; 53°10′00″N 4°20′08″W	30 January 1968	Church	Located within an enclosed churchyard on the NW side of a right-angle corner of the A4080, c800m W of the village of Dwyran and c1.5km E of Newborough.	20553	See more images
Prichard Jones Institute	Newborough, Anglesey, Rhosyr; SH4251865804; 53°09′58″N 4°21′26″W	19 October 1998	Institute	Set back from the NW side of Pen-dref Street, within grounds also housing 6 cottage homes built to front of the Institute, c650m NE of the Church of St Peter in Newborough.	20554	Prichard Jones Institute
Mona and Mona Isaf	Llangristiolus; SH4254774933; 53°14′53″N 4°21′41″W	23 December 1998	House	The house is prominently sited, and set back slightly, from the SW side of the A5(T), with courtyard range to the rear; c2.5km NE of the church of St Cristiolus.	21069	Upload Photo
Trwyn Du, or Black Point, Lighthouse	Llangoed; SH6414381498; 53°18′47″N 4°02′26″W	26 March 1999	Lighthouse	Situated in the strait between Black Point, or Trwyn Du, Penmon, Anglesey and Puffin Island, close to the shore but accessible only at low tide.	21615	See more images
Corn Mill at Felin Gafnan	Porth y Felin, Cylch-y-Garn; SH3447693354; 53°24′39″N 4°29′30″W	27 November 2000	Corn mill	In an isolated rural location near the coast at Porth y Felin. Set back from the N side of the country road running along the N coast of the island at Cemlyn Bay. The mill is located c2.25km E of the Church of St Rhwydrys.	24416	Corn Mill at Felin Gafnan
Church of Our Lady Star of the Sea and St Winefride	Amlwch; SH4380493101; 53°24′42″N 4°21′05″W	12 December 2000		In an elevated position, set back from the N side of the A5025 on the way out to Porth Llechog (Bull Bay).	24455	See more images
Gronant	Llanfachraeth; SH3270885173; 53°20′13″N 4°30′50″W	19 December 2000	House	Located at the end of a long trackway leading off the NE side of the A5025, N of Llanfachraeth. Gronant is reached via a driveway to the R of the access track, immediately before the farm entrance.	24468	Upload Photo
Range including cornbarn, granary, threshing room and lofted cowhouse at Llwydiarth Esgob Farm	Rhosybol; SH4352084394; 53°20′00″N 4°21′05″W	21 February 2001	Farm buildings	Set well back, along a private driveway, from the N side of a country road leading E off the B5111 out of Llanerchymedd towards Benllech. The corn barn range is to the W of the farmhouse.	24836	Range including cornbarn, granary, threshing room and lofted cowhouse at Llwydiarth Esgob Farm
Range including cowhouse, stables, coach house, smithy and poultry house at Llwydiarth Esgob Farm	Rhosybol; SH4352384424; 53°20′01″N 4°21′05″W	21 February 2001	Farm buildings	Set well back, along a private driveway, from the N side of a country road leading E off the B5111 out of Llanerchymedd towards Benllech. The cowhouse, stables and coach house range is located to the rear (NW) of the farmhouse.	24837	Upload Photo
Range including pigsties, laundry, slaughter house, cartsheds and coalshed at Llwydiarth Esgob Farm	Rhosybol; SH4356384441; 53°20′01″N 4°21′03″W	21 February 2001	Farm buildings	Set well back, along a private driveway, from the N side of a country road leading E off the B5111 out of Llanerchymedd towards Benllech. The pigsty, laundry and slaughter house range is located NE of the farmhouse.	24838	Upload Photo
Hammels at Llwydiarth Esgob Farm	Rhosybol; SH4363784391; 53°20′00″N 4°20′59″W	21 February 2001		Set well back, along a private driveway, from the N side of a country road leading E off the B5111 out of Llanerchymedd towards Benllech. The hammels are located to E of the farmhouse.	24839	Upload Photo
Ysgol Syr Thomas Jones	Amlwch; SH4374692096; 53°24′09″N 4°21′07″W	31 October 2001	School	Set back, within private grounds, from the SW side of Ffordd Tanybryn in Pentrefelin.	25852	See more images
No 2 Lewis Rogers Almshouses	Penmynydd; SH5135874231; 53°14′39″N 4°13′45″W	2 May 1952	Almshouses	Set at right angles to the S side of the B5420 in the centre of the village of Penmynydd.	26140	No 2 Lewis Rogers Almshouses
No 3 Lewis Rogers Almshouses	Penmynydd; SH5135574223; 53°14′39″N 4°13′45″W	2 May 1952	Almshouses	Set at right angles to the S side of the B5420 in the centre of the village of Penmynydd.	26141	No 3 Lewis Rogers Almshouses
No 4 Lewis Rogers Almshouses	Penmynydd; SH5135274215; 53°14′39″N 4°13′45″W	2 May 1952	Almshouses	Set at right angles to the S side of the B5420 in the centre of the village of Penmynydd.	26142	No 4 Lewis Rogers Almshouses
No 5 Lewis Rogers Almshouse	Penmynydd; SH5134974206; 53°14′38″N 4°13′45″W	2 May 1952	Almshouses	Set at right angles to the S side of the B5420 in the centre of the village of Penmynydd.	26143	No 5 Lewis Rogers Almshouse
Dovecote and barn at Penmon Priory	Llangoed; SH6311480718; 53°18′20″N 4°03′21″W	17 July 2002	Dovecote	Set at the S side of a country road leading to the SE tip of the island at Black Point, or Trwyn Du, Penmon.	26763	See more images
Plas Rhianfa	Cwm Cadnant; SH5701473385; 53°14′17″N 4°08′38″W	9 June 2004	Stately home	Built in 1851 on the family estate, set back from the A545 Beaumaris Road out of Menai Bridge towards Beaumaris. The Gatehouse, Summerhouse and Dovecote are also listed buildings.	81142	See more images
1 Green Edge	Beaumaris; SH6072376113; 53°15′49″N 4°05′23″W	23 September 1950	House	Part of a terrace of houses built in 1825. Set back from the street and at the west end of the terrace, on the corner with Mona Place.	84677	1 Green Edge
2 Green Edge	Beaumaris; SH6072876117; 53°15′49″N 4°05′22″W	23 September 1950	House	Part of a terrace of houses built in 1825, set back from the street.	84702	2 Green Edge
3 Green Edge	Beaumaris; SH6073476121; 53°15′50″N 4°05′22″W	23 September 1950	House	Part of a terrace of houses built in 1825, set back from the street.	84718	3 Green Edge
4 Green Edge	Beaumaris; SH6073876125; 53°15′50″N 4°05′22″W	23 September 1950	House	Part of a terrace of houses built in 1825, set back from the street.	84728	4 Green Edge
5 Green Edge	Beaumaris; SH6074376128; 53°15′50″N 4°05′22″W	23 September 1950	House	Part of a terrace of houses built in 1825, set back from the street.	84734	5 Green Edge

== See also ==
- List of Scheduled Monuments in Anglesey
- Grade I listed buildings in Anglesey
- Registered historic parks and gardens in Anglesey
