= Grade I listed buildings in Anglesey =

Anglesey shown within Wales

In the United Kingdom, the term listed building refers to a building or other structure officially designated as being of special architectural, historical, or cultural significance; Grade I structures are those considered to be "buildings of exceptional interest". Listing was begun by a provision in the Town and Country Planning Act 1947. Once listed, strict limitations are imposed on the modifications allowed to a building's structure or fittings. In Wales, the authority for listing under the Planning (Listed Buildings and Conservation Areas) Act 1990 rests with Cadw.

== Buildings ==
Name	Location Grid Ref. (Note: Sometimes known as OSGB36, the grid reference is based on the British national grid reference system used by the Ordnance Survey.) Geo-coordinates	Date Listed	Function	Notes	Reference Number	Image
St Mary's Church and churchyard walls, Tal-y-llyn	Aberffraw; SH3666572869; 53°13′40″N 4°26′54″W	5 April 1971	Church	In an isolated location at the E side of a country lane c. 4.25km NE of Aberffraw and c. 3.75km SW of Gwalchmai; the chapel lies within an enclosed circular churchyard.	5275	See more images
St Eilian's Church	Llaneilian; SH4697892897; 53°24′38″N 4°18′13″W	12 May 1970	Church	In Llaneilian village, set in a large rectangular churchyard with stone boundary walls and two sets of gates to south and west.	5363	See more images
St Mary's Church, Llanfair-yng-Nghornwy	Cylch-y-Garn; SH3272290847; 53°23′16″N 4°31′01″W	12 May 1970	Church	Reached by a trackway and set back, within a sub-rectangular churchyard, from the NW side of the road at the SE end of the village of Llanfair-yng-Nghornwy.	5380	See more images
St Cybi's Church	Holyhead; SH2471482620; 53°18′41″N 4°37′57″W	26 September 1951	Church	In churchyard overlooking inner harbour, entered by archway from Market Square.	5413	See more images
Walls of upper churchyard, Market Square	Holyhead; SH2469782619; 53°18′41″N 4°37′58″W	26 September 1951	Walls	Remains of a Roman fort, with walls reaching up to 4m in height.	5415	See more images
Penmon Priory	Penmon (Llangoed); SH6303380731; 53°18′21″N 4°03′25″W	30 January 1968	Church	Slightly set back from the N side of a country road which leads down to the SE tip of the island at Black Point, or Trwyn Du, Penmon.	5525	See more images
Penmon Priory Refectory	Llangoed; SH6304480709; 53°18′20″N 4°03′25″W	17 July 2002	Refectory	Slightly set back from the N side of a country road leading to the SE tip of the island at Black Point, or Trwyn Du, Penmon. The Refectory forms the S side of a cloister yard; abutted by the Priory house at the NW corner.	26764	See more images
The Holy Well and Cell	Penmon (Llangoed); SH6305780797; 53°18′23″N 4°03′24″W	5 February 1952	Well	Set back, along a trackway, from the N side of a country road leading to the SE tip of the island at Black Point, or Trwyn Du, Penmon. The Holy Well and Cell are c50m NNE of the Priory Church of St Seiriol at Penmon.	5437	See more images
Plas Newydd	Llanddaniel Fab; SH5208169588; 53°12′10″N 4°12′58″W	30 January 1968	House	Located 1.5km SW of Llanfairpwll on the A4080. Sited on an artificial terrace alongside the Menai Strait, overlooking the Snowdonia mountains to the E.	5462	See more images
St Cadwaladr's Church	Llangadwaladr (Bodorgan); SH3837169271; 53°11′45″N 4°25′15″W	30 January 1968	Church	Located within an enclosed rectangular churchyard (now extended to the SE); set back from the N side of the A4080 in the hamlet of Llangadwaladr.	5505	See more images
Remains of monastic settlement including tower and walls	Puffin Island (Llangoed); SH6516782162; 53°19′09″N 4°01′32″W	30 January 1968	Monastery (ruined)	A partly ruined 12th-century church, located in the central part of the island, off the SE tip of the Isle of Anglesey.	5528	Upload Photo
Beaumaris Castle	Beaumaris; SH6072476245; 53°15′54″N 4°05′23″W	23 September 1950	Castle	At the E end of Castle Street.	5574	See more images
Beaumaris Gaol	Beaumaris; SH6035776082; 53°15′48″N 4°05′42″W	23 September 1950	Gaol	A large building occupying the whole block bounded by Bunkers Hill, Steeple Lane and Gaol Street.	5579	See more images
Perimeter walls of Beaumaris Gaol	Beaumaris; SH6035176094; 53°15′48″N 4°05′43″W	23 September 1950	Walls	Occupying the block defined by Steeple Lane, Bunkers Hill, Gaol Street, and a narrow alley at the S end.	5580	See more images
Bulkeley Hotel	Beaumaris; SH6058376056; 53°15′47″N 4°05′30″W	23 September 1950	Hotel	Prominently sited with one front in the centre of Castle Street, and the opposite front forming one of the most conspicuous buildings facing The Green.	5588	See more images
Church of SS Mary and Nicholas	Beaumaris; SH6041076128; 53°15′49″N 4°05′40″W	23 September 1950	Church	In a large churchyard with Church Street to the E and Steeple Lane to the W.	5620	See more images
Remains of medieval town wall	Beaumaris; SH6043376235; 53°15′53″N 4°05′38″W	23 September 1950	Town Wall	Behind Nos 40-42 and 38 Church Street.	5633	See more images
Menai Suspension Bridge	Menai Bridge; SH5565271450; 53°13′14″N 4°09′49″W	27 May 1949	Bridge	Spanning the Menai Strait S of Menai Bridge.	18572	See more images
Hafotty	Llansadwrn; SH5621678172; 53°16′52″N 4°09′29″W	28 May 2003	House	Medieval hall house dating from the 14th century, built to an H-shaped plan within private grounds. NW side of a country road which leads NNE off the B5109 towards Llanddona.	81136	See more images
1 Victoria Terrace, including short section of forecourt railings to left	Beaumaris; SH6065676060; 53°15′47″N 4°05′26″W	23 September 1950	House	Victoria Terrace is the most prominent building facing The Green. No 1, at the L end, is entered from The Green.	5636	See more images
2 Victoria Terrace	Beaumaris; SH6066476062; 53°15′48″N 4°05′26″W	23 September 1950	House	Victoria Terrace is the most prominent building facing The Green. No 2 is entered from The Green.	84703	See more images
3 Victoria Terrace	Beaumaris; SH6067076064; 53°15′48″N 4°05′25″W	23 September 1950	House	Victoria Terrace is the most prominent building facing The Green. No 3 is entered from The Green.	84719	See more images
4 Victoria Terrace	Beaumaris; SH6067776067; 53°15′48″N 4°05′25″W	23 September 1950	House	Victoria Terrace is the most prominent building facing The Green. No 4 is entered from The Green.	84727	See more images
5 Victoria Terrace	Beaumaris; SH6068676070; 53°15′48″N 4°05′25″W	23 September 1950	House	Victoria Terrace is the most prominent building facing The Green. No 5 is entered from The Green.	84735	See more images
6 Victoria Terrace	Beaumaris; SH6069376074; 53°15′48″N 4°05′24″W	23 September 1950	House	Victoria Terrace is the most prominent building facing The Green. No 6 is entered from The Green.	84743	See more images
7 Victoria Terrace	Beaumaris; SH6069776083; 53°15′48″N 4°05′24″W	23 September 1950	House	Victoria Terrace is the most prominent building facing The Green. No 7 is entered from The Green.	84747	See more images
8 Victoria Terrace	Beaumaris; SH6070176089; 53°15′48″N 4°05′24″W	23 September 1950	House	Victoria Terrace is the most prominent building facing The Green. No 8 is entered from The Green.	84750	See more images
9 Victoria Terrace	Beaumaris; SH6070676095; 53°15′49″N 4°05′24″W	23 September 1950	House	Victoria Terrace is the most prominent building facing The Green. No 9 is entered from The Green.	84752	See more images
10 Victoria Terrace	Beaumaris; SH6071076102; 53°15′49″N 4°05′23″W	23 September 1950	House	Victoria Terrace is the most prominent building facing The Green. No 10, at the R end of the terrace, is entered from Mona Place.	84680	See more images
12 Victoria Terrace	Beaumaris; SH6066276066; 53°15′48″N 4°05′26″W	23 September 1950	House	Victoria Terrace is the most prominent building facing The Green. No 12 is entered from a balcony at the rear.	84683	See more images
13 Victoria Terrace	Beaumaris; SH6066876069; 53°15′48″N 4°05′26″W	23 September 1950	House	Victoria Terrace is the most prominent building facing The Green. No 13 is entered from a balcony at the rear.	84684	See more images
14 Victoria Terrace	Beaumaris; SH6067476072; 53°15′48″N 4°05′25″W	23 September 1950	House	Victoria Terrace is the most prominent building facing The Green. No 14 is entered from a balcony at the rear.	84686	See more images
15 Victoria Terrace	Beaumaris; SH6068276074; 53°15′48″N 4°05′25″W	23 September 1950	House	Victoria Terrace is the most prominent building facing The Green. No 15 is entered from a balcony at the rear.	84689	See more images
16 Victoria Terrace	Beaumaris; SH6068876078; 53°15′48″N 4°05′24″W	23 September 1950	House	Victoria Terrace is the most prominent building facing The Green. No 16 is entered from a balcony at the rear.	84691	See more images
17 Victoria Terrace	Beaumaris; SH6069276085; 53°15′48″N 4°05′24″W	23 September 1950	House	Victoria Terrace is the most prominent building facing The Green. No 17 is entered from a balcony at the rear.	84693	See more images
18 Victoria Terrace	Beaumaris; SH6069776092; 53°15′49″N 4°05′24″W	23 September 1950	House	Victoria Terrace is the most prominent building facing The Green. No 18 is entered from a balcony at the rear.	84696	See more images
19 Victoria Terrace	Beaumaris; SH6070276098; 53°15′49″N 4°05′24″W	23 September 1950	House	Victoria Terrace is the most prominent building facing The Green. No 19 is entered from The Green.	84698	See more images
20 Victoria Terrace	Beaumaris; SH6070576106; 53°15′49″N 4°05′24″W	23 September 1950	House	Victoria Terrace is the most prominent building facing The Green. No 20 is entered from The Green.	84708	See more images

== See also ==
- Grade II* listed buildings in Anglesey
- Listed buildings in Wales
- List of scheduled monuments in Anglesey
- Registered historic parks and gardens in Anglesey
