= Talyllyn =

Talyllyn or Tal-y-llyn can refer to:

- Tal-y-llyn, Gwynedd, the hamlet and former parish in Gwynedd in Wales
  - Tal-y-llyn Lake, a glacial ribbon lake east of Abergynolwyn
  - Talyllyn Railway, a preserved narrow gauge railway running from Tywyn to Abergynolwn
  - Talyllyn (locomotive), one of the original locomotives of the Talyllyn Railway
- Talyllyn and Llanfihangel Talyllyn, small settlements in the Powys community of Llangors
  - Talyllyn Junction, a nearby junction on the Mid Wales Railway in Powys
- Tal-y-llyn, Anglesey, a former episcopal township on Anglesey
  - St Mary's Church, Tal-y-llyn, the township's church
