= Registered historic parks and gardens in Anglesey =

List of buildings in county of Wales

Anglesey shown within Wales

The Isle of Anglesey, a principal area off the north-west coast of Wales, includes the islands of Anglesey, Holy Island and some islets and skerries. It covers an area of 711 km^{2} (275 sq mi) and in 2021 the population was approximately 68,900.

The Cadw/ICOMOS Register of Parks and Gardens of Special Historic Interest in Wales was established in 2002 and given statutory status in 2022. It is administered by Cadw, the historic environment agency of the Welsh Government. Elisabeth Whittle described Cadw as having a "somewhat special and guiding role" in the preservation of historic parks and gardens, since they are "an integral part of Welsh archaeological and architectural heritage". The register includes just under 400 sites, ranging from gardens of private houses, to cemeteries and public parks. Parks and gardens are listed at one of three grades, matching the grading system used for listed buildings. Grade I is the highest grade, for sites of exceptional interest; Grade II*, the next highest, denotes parks and gardens of great quality; while Grade II denotes sites of special interest.

There are nine registered parks and gardens in Anglesey. One is listed at Grade I, five at Grade II* and three at Grade II.

== Key ==
Grade	Criteria
I	Parks and gardens of exceptional interest
II*	Parks and gardens of great quality
II	Parks and gardens of special interest

== List of parks and gardens ==
List of parks and gardens
Name	Location Grid Ref. (Note: Sometimes known as OSGB36, the grid reference is based on the British national grid reference system used by the Ordnance Survey.) Geo-coordinates	Date Listed	Description / Notes	Grade	Reference Number	Image
Bodowen and Bodorgan	Bodorgan; SH3728065830; 53°09′53″N 4°26′08″W	1 February 2022	Park, American garden, country house garden and kitchen garden The relict garden at Bodowen dates to the early seventeenth-century during which time the estate is known to have had a deer park. Bodowen was absorbed by the adjacent Bodorgan estate in the nineteenth century. The terraced garden, American and walled gardens at Bodorgan date from the nineteenth century. Its parkland area is used for farmland and also has a deer park within it.	II*	PGW(Gd)44(ANG)	a large house surrounded by trees
Carreglwyd	Llanfaethlu; SH3080587715; 53°21′32″N 4°32′34″W	1 February 2022	Park, kitchen garden and woodland garden The Georgian manor house and several other listed structures are set within a woodland garden with an informal ornamental lake, surrounded by the park of open grazed enclosures. The layout is nineteenth century but incorporates earlier design elements. The walled garden to the north of the house is eighteenth century with a later extension (pre-1891).	II*	PGW(Gd)43(ANG)	a house with trees to each side and a lawn in front of it, there is a lake in the foreground
Cestyll	Cylch-y-Garn; SH3447393364; 53°24′39″N 4°29′26″W	1 February 2022	Country house garden A small and secluded 1920s garden whose owner and principal designer, Violet Vivian, was a friend of Princess Victoria who also designed part of the garden. The sheltered valley garden is informally planted a wide variety of trees and shrubs. There is a Grade II* listed corn mill near the garden and the area also includes the remains of the kitchen garden and the site of the house which was demolished in 1991.	II	PGW(Gd)45(ANG)	a stone building with a water wheel, rocks and plants in the foreground
Llanidan	Llanidan; SH4951966934; 53°10′40″N 4°15′07″W	1 February 2022	Park, country house garden and walled garden Llanidan Hall and adjacent medieval Old Church of St Nidan (both grade II* listed) are set within a small but well-preserved eighteenth century landscape park that incorporates the circular churchyard and a holy well. A ha-ha defines the boundary between the park and garden. The walled garden, which was redesigned in the 1980s, is of early seventeenth-century origin.	II*	PGW(Gd)46(ANG)	a row of four stone arches in front of trees
Plas Berw	Llanfihangel Ysgeifiog; SH4660471822; 53°13′16″N 4°17′52″W	1 February 2022	Deer Park, country house garden and walled garden The early seventeenth-century house and gardens are set within a deer park which may date to the fifteenth century. The park has been damaged by road and railway engineering: the B4419 runs along eastern boundary and a railway (built c. 1841) passes through the park.	II*	PGW(Gd)42(ANG)	buildings surrounded by trees, fields in the foreground
Plas Gwyn	Plas Gwyn; SH5278078068; 53°16′44″N 4°12′30″W	1 February 2022	Park, country house garden and walled garden The Georgian mansion was completed in 1754. The park and gardens are thought to be contemporary with this but with nineteenth century alterations made to the park. The house and several nearby buildings are listed, as are the gates and lodges at the south and north-east entrances.	II	PGW(Gd)47(ANG)	buildings standing in a park with trees
Plas Newydd	Llanddaniel Fab; SH5184969432; 53°12′04″N 4°13′06″W	1 February 2022	Park, country house garden and walled garden The large estate located on the west shore of the Menai Strait contains numerous listed buildings and two scheduled monuments (both are Neolithic burial chambers). The park was landscaped at the turn of the eighteenth and nineteenth centuries. To the north of the house is a formal garden with terraces, and to the south-west are the walled gardens. In the 1870s visitors could obtain tickets to visit the grounds with the proceeds going to a local charity. The property is now owned by the National Trust.	I	PGW(Gd)48(ANG)	a lawn with surrounded by trees and plants, there is a large house in the background
Plas Rhianfa	Cwm Cadnant; SH5693373382; 53°14′16″N 4°08′38″W	1 February 2022	Country house garden The steeply sloping site was laid out in the mid-nineteenth century with formal terraces planted in a style reminiscent of the Mediterranean. Originally the site covered 12 acres (4.9 ha) but only a quarter of this remains, the rest having been sold off. The house (Grade II*) and the garden summer house and dovecote (Grade II) are listed buildings.	II	PGW(Gd)49(ANG)	a tree covered landscape with a large mansion and several houses, water in the foreground
Ty Fry	Pentraeth; SH5150476800; 53°16′02″N 4°13′37″W	1 February 2022	Country house garden The seventeenth-century gentry house is set within a landscape of rocky outcrops that has been laid out with raised walks and rock-cut steps. There is a formal inner garden is to the north-west of the house and an informal outer garden to the south and west. There are numerous springs and to the north is an area that may once have been a formal water garden.	II*	PGW(Gd)66(ANG)	Ty Fry

== See also ==
- List of scheduled monuments in Anglesey
- Grade I listed buildings in Anglesey
- Grade II* listed buildings in Anglesey
