= William Massey (rower) =

English rower, cricketer, and barrister

- Born: 18 June 1817; Moston Hall, Cheshire, England
- Died: 18 December 1898 (aged 81); Nantwich, England
- Education: Harrow School, Trinity College, Cambridge
- Occupations: rower, cricketer, barrister
- Known for: rowing for Trinity College
- Notable work: won the first Grand Challenge Cup at Henley Royal Regatta

William Massey (18 June 1817 – 18 December 1898) was an English rower, cricketer and barrister.

Massey was born at Moston Hall, Cheshire, the eldest son of Richard Massey. He was educated at Harrow School and admitted to Trinity College, Cambridge on 7 December 1835. Massey played cricket for Cambridge University in 1837, 1838 and 1839. He also played for Cambridge Town in 1838. In 1839 he stroked the Trinity College crew that won the first Grand Challenge Cup at Henley Royal Regatta. He was in the Cambridge boat in the Boat Race in 1840. From 1839 to 1842 he played cricket for Marylebone Cricket Club (MCC). Massey played 19 innings in 13 first-class matches at an average of 4.64 and a top score of 42. He took 6 catches.

Massey was admitted at Lincoln's Inn on 14 January 1841 and was called to the Bar on 3 May 1850. He lived at Cornelyn, Llangoed, Anglesey and was justice of the peace and deputy lieutenant for Anglesey. He was High Sheriff of Anglesey in 1864 and chairman of the Quarter Sessions from 1873 to 1877.

Massey died at Nantwich, Cheshire at the age of 81.

== See also ==
- List of Cambridge University Boat Race crews
- Massey Sisters

Honorary titles
Preceded by Robert Lloyd Jones Parry	High Sheriff of Anglesey; 1864–1865	Succeeded by George Higgins
