= Bulkeley Hotel =

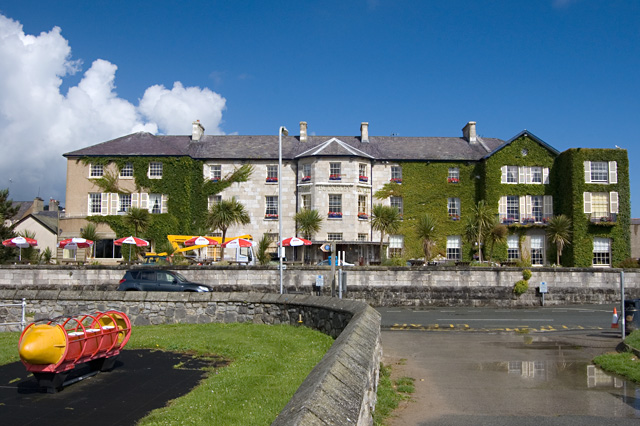
- "the finest of its date in Wales"

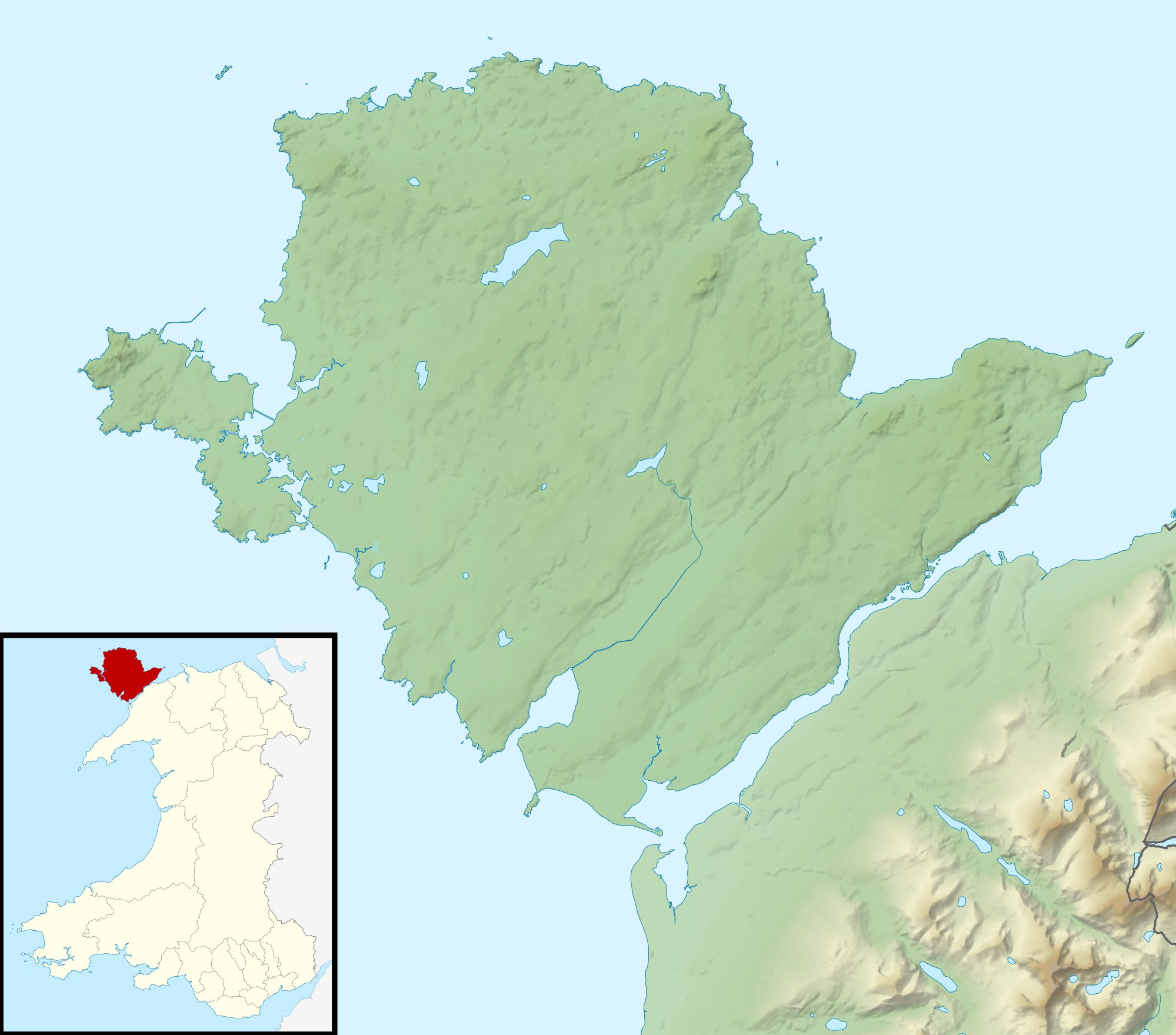
- Location within Anglesey
- 53.2631°N 4.0917°W
- Type: Hotel
- Location: Beaumaris, Anglesey, Wales

History
- Built: 1829

Site notes
- Architect(s): Joseph Hansom, Edward Welch, later additions by Peter Shearson Gregory and Sidney Colwyn Foulkes
- Architectural style: Neoclassical
- Governing body: Privately owned

Listed Building – Grade I
- Official name: Bulkeley Hotel including screen wall to left hand courtyard
- Designated: 23 September 1950
- Reference no.: 5588

Listed Building – Grade II
- Official name: Forecourt wall and gate piers on S side of the Bulkeley Hotel
- Designated: 13 July 2005
- Reference no.: 84760

The Bulkeley Hotel stands on the seafront in Beaumaris, Anglesey, Wales. It was designed by the architectural partnership of Joseph Hansom and Edward Welch for the Beaumaris Corporation. The development was a central part of the corporation's plans to reposition Beaumaris as a fashionable seaside resort in response to its declining maritime trade. It is designated a Grade I listed building, and remains in operation.

== History ==
The town and castle of Beaumaris were created in the late 13th century as part of the Conquest of Wales led by Edward I. Planned in the 1280s, and constructed from 1295 by Edward's master builder, James of St George, the settlement replaced the historic Welsh capital of Llanfaes. Beaumaris's location, and natural harbour, encouraged maritime trade and in the Middle Ages the town flourished as a port and the customs hub for North-West Wales. By the early 19th century this trade was in decline and the town's council sought to reinvent Beaumaris as a seaside resort. A visit to the town by Princess Victoria in 1832 saw the Victoria Terrace named in her honour and the princess and her mother, the Duchess of Kent, stayed at the Bulkeley Hotel.

Later additions to the hotel were made by P. Shearson Gregory at the very end of the 19th century, and in the 1930s the architect Sidney Colwyn Foulkes extended the building. (Note: Sidney Colwyn Foulkes designed much of the architecture of Colwyn Bay.)

== Architecture and description ==
The hotel is a five bay, three-storey block in a Neoclassical design. The construction material is limestone ashlar. Richard Haslam, Julian Orbach and Adam Voelcker, in their 2009 edition Gywnedd, in the Buildings of Wales series, call it "the finest of its date in Wales". (Note: The hotel stands on Castle Street in Beaumaris which Haslam, Orbach and Voelcker consider, "architecturally the finest in Anglesey".) The hotel is a Grade I listed building. The forecourt wall and gate piers are separately listed at Grade II.

== Sources ==
- Haslam, Richard; Orbach, Julian; Voelcker, Adam (2009). Gwynedd. The Buildings of Wales. New Haven, US and London: Yale University Press. ISBN 978-0-300-14169-6. OCLC 1023292902.
