= Edith Massey =

Edith Massey may refer to:

- Edith Massey (1863–1946), Welsh botanist and painter, one of the two Massey Sisters
- Edith Massey (actress) (1918–1984), American actress and singer
