= Ceredigion Archives =

Welsh regional archive service

Coordinates: 52.41741°N 4.0817°W

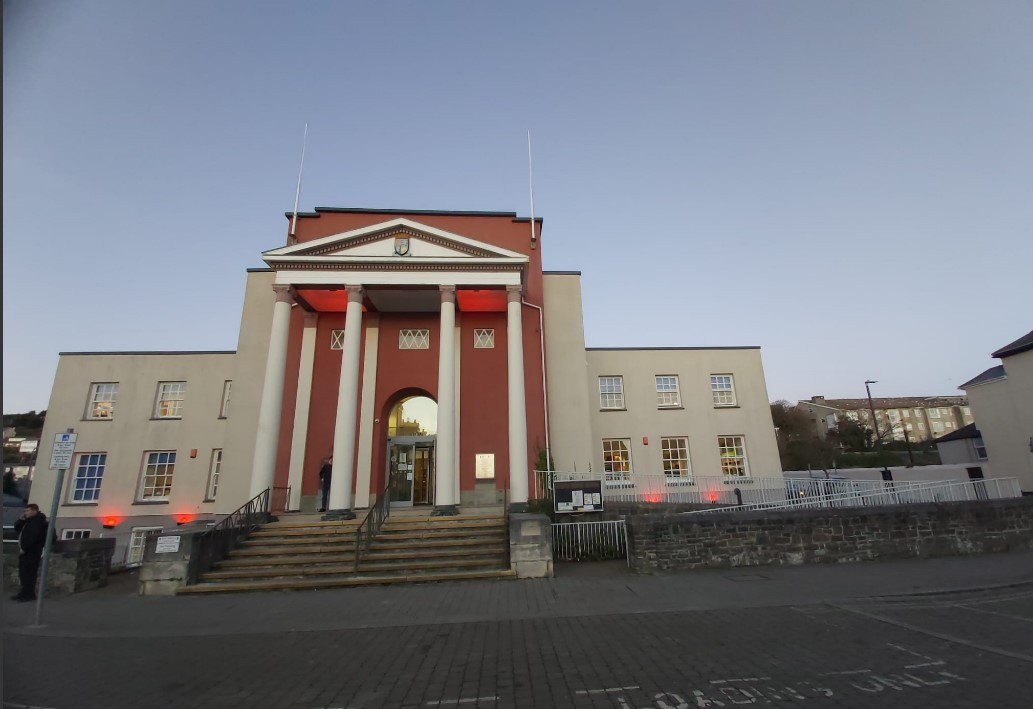
The archive is located, along with the town library in the old town hall building

Ceredigion Archives (Welsh: Archifdy Ceredigion) is a regional archive service and the county record office for Ceredigion County Council. Located since 2012, in Aberystwyth Town Hall, the archive collects, curates, preserves and gives access to records relating to the county and its administration.

The archives are open to members of the public for general research, genealogy, local history, academic research, and business research.

== History ==
The Ceredigion County Archives was established in 1974 as the third record office for Dyfed and was originally known as Cardiganshire Area Record Office. It was renamed and re-launched as Ceredigion Archives in 1996. Until 2012, the Archive was located in the Grade II listed building Queen's Hotel building on Aberystwyth Promenade. When the council sold that building, a new purpose-built archive complex was built at the Aberystwyth Town Hall, which also houses the town library. In 2019, the Archives secured funding from the Welsh Government to purchase the nearby old lifeboat station and convert it into an archival storage facility.

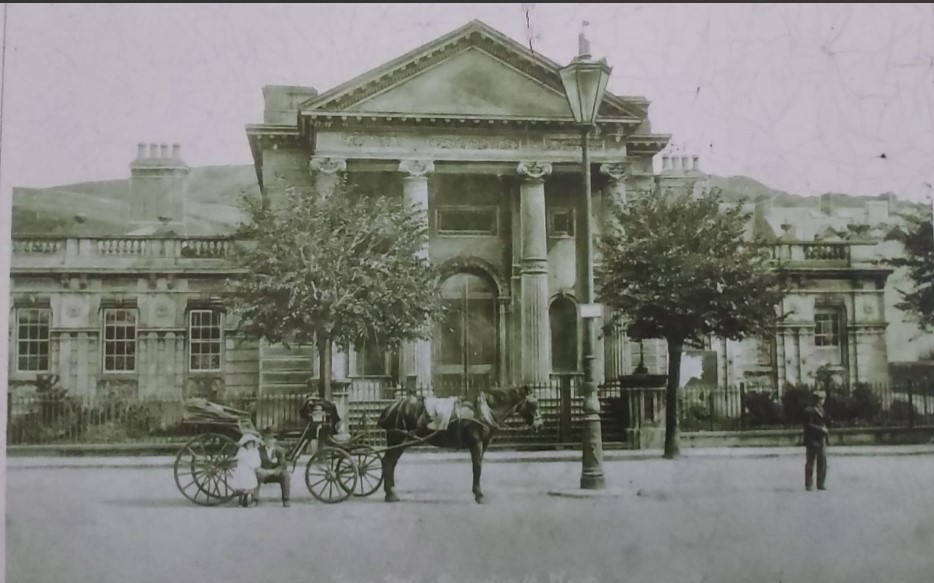
Old town hall building, 1903

== Collections ==
The archives hold many important historical collections relating to the history of Ceredigion. These include court records, estate records, and parish registers, making the archives a popular destination for family history researchers. The archive also includes a collection of 19th-century shipping records and a comprehensive collection of car registration records.

In 2015, the archives received a grant from the National Manuscripts Conservation Trust to preserve an important letter from a local soldier who fought at the Battle of Waterloo.

The archives also hold the public archives of Ceredigion County Council, including electoral rolls, school records, and local council records.
