= Hen Bentref Llandegfan =

Coordinates: 53.250989°N 4.143914°W

- Location within Anglesey
- OS grid reference: SH 5706 7481
  - Cardiff: 128.9 mi (207.4 km)
  - London: 207.8 mi (334.4 km)
- Community: Cwm Cadnant
- Principal area: Anglesey
- Country: Wales
- Sovereign state: United Kingdom
- Post town: Porthaethwy
- Police: North Wales
- Fire: North Wales
- Ambulance: Welsh
- UK Parliament: Ynys Môn
- Senedd Cymru – Welsh Parliament: Ynys Môn

Hen Bentref Llandegfan is a village in the community of Cwm Cadnant, Anglesey, Wales, which is 128.9 miles (207.5 km) from Cardiff and 207.8 miles (334.3 km) from London. It is near Llandegfan.

"Hen Bentref" in Welsh means "the old village".

== See also ==
- List of localities in Wales by population
