= St Mary's and St Nicholas's Church, Beaumaris =

Church in Anglesey, UK

Coordinates: 53.2637°N 4.0943°W

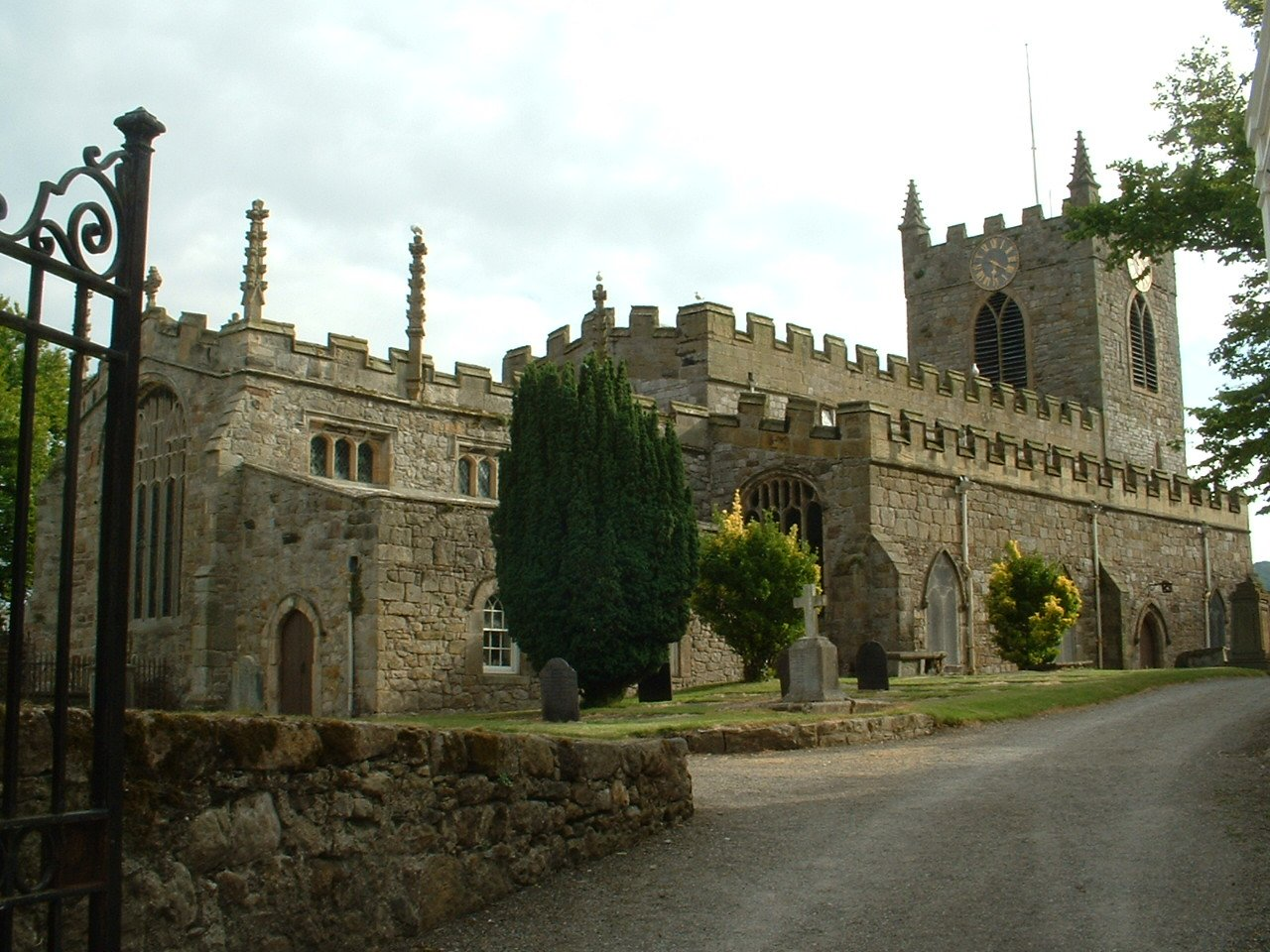
Beaumaris Church

St Mary and St Nicholas Church, Beaumaris, an Anglican church, is a fourteenth century Grade I listed building in Beaumaris, Anglesey, Wales.

== History ==
The church was founded around 1330, initially as a chapel of ease to Llandegfan, to serve the new town.

== Description ==
It retains a 14th-century decorated nave, with four-bay arcades, although the chancel was rebuilt around 1500 in Perpendicular style. The west tower is of four stages, with a battlemented parapet. The upper section was remodelled in the early 19th century. The north vestry and south porch are probably nineteenth century. The exterior is mainly Perpendicular.

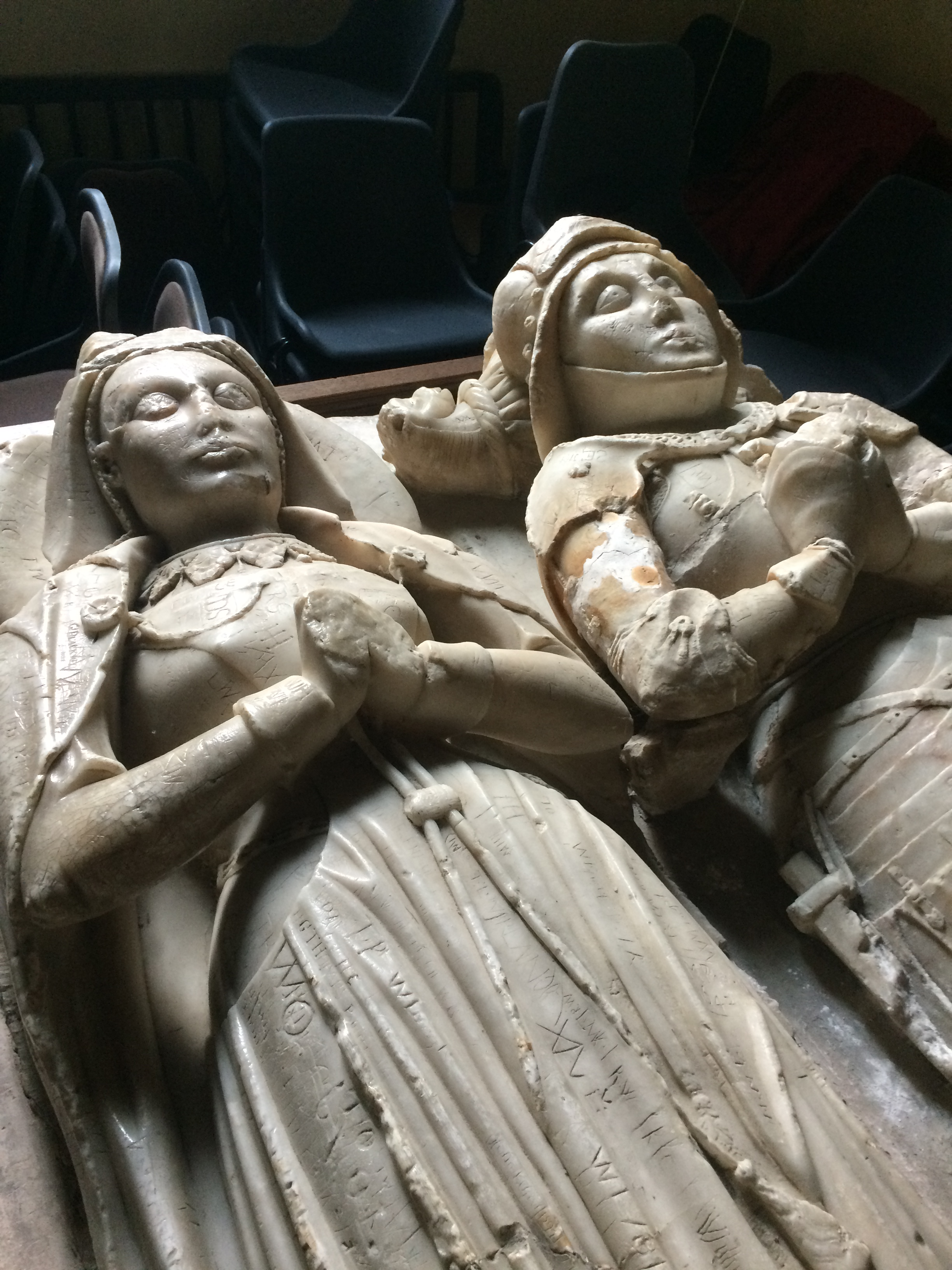
Tomb effigies of William Bulkeley, deputy constable of Beaumaris Castle, and his wife

There are sixteenth century chancel stalls, and also the coffin and lid of Joan, wife of Llywelyn ab Iorwerth, married at the age of 15, and illegitimate daughter of King John. There are late fifteenth to early sixteenth century misericords, although with eight 1902 replacements. It is likely the old misericords came from the friary at Llan-faes. The church also contains the tomb of William Bulkeley, (died c. 1490), deputy constable of the castle, and of his wife. This is made of Midlands alabaster. A number of monuments to leading sixteenth and seventeenth century Establishment figures (notably Sir Henry Sidney, Lord President of Wales and Lord Deputy of Ireland, a parson son of Sir Julius Caesar and a niece of George Herbert) adorn the chancel east wall. The chancel north wall contains a medieval brass plaque and a monument to an eighteenth-century Viscount Bulkeley.

The clock tower has a ring of eight bells, with six cast in 1819 augmented by two additional bells cast in 1914. The bells are in A flat and hung for full circle ringing. The four clock faces and their mechanism are maintained by Beaumaris borough.

St Mary's and St Nicholas's is located in a large churchyard, with Church Street to the east and Steeple Lane to the west. A number of slate tombstones line the north wall of the churchyard providing detail of sociological interest (occupations etc.). A large tomb of a local polymath stands near the south porch; other slate tombstones have been destroyed near the south path due to the use of mechanical appliances.

== See also ==
- Grade I listed buildings in Anglesey
