= Skerries Lighthouse =

Lighthouse in Anglesey, Wales

Skerries Lighthouse Ynys Y Moelrhoniaid
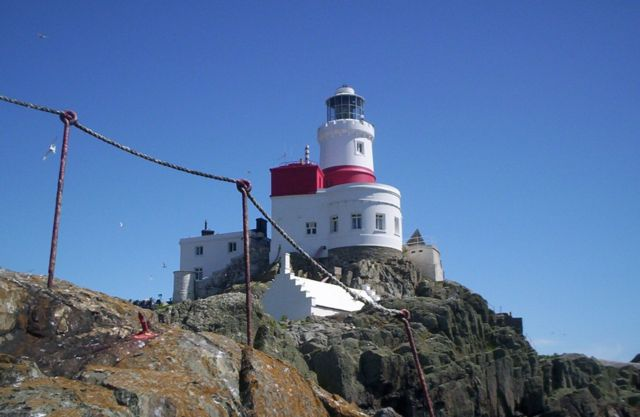
- Location: Carmel Head; Anglesey; Wales; United Kingdom
- Coordinates: 53.421221°N 4.608142°W

Tower
- Constructed: 1717
- Construction: stone tower
- Automated: 1987
- Height: 23 metres (75 ft)
- Shape: cylindrical tower with balcony and lantern attached to a 2-storey keeper’s house
- Markings: white tower with a broad red horizontal band, white lantern
- Operator: Trinity House
- Heritage: Grade II* listed building, National Monument of Wales

Light
- Focal height: 36 metres (118 ft)
- Lens: 1st Order (920mm) six panel catadioptric asymmetrical
- Intensity: 89,900 candela
- Range: 20 nautical miles (37 km; 23 mi)
- Characteristic: Fl (2) W 15s.

The Skerries Lighthouse was first lit on the highest point of the largest island in The Skerries, Isle of Anglesey after 1716. A patent for the lighthouse was subsequently obtained in 1824. The builder was William Trench, who lost his son off the rocks and died in debt in 1725. He is said to have originally been allowed a pension from the Post Office, rather than payment from shipping tolls. The Skerries Lighthouse Act 1729 (3 Geo. 2. c. 36) allowed his son-in-law, Sutton Morgan, to increase the dues charged for shipping and confirmed the patent on the light to Morgan's heirs forever.

== History ==
It was rebuilt around 1759 by Morgan's heirs for about £3,000. The rebuilt lighthouse was a slightly tapering limestone tower, 6.65 metres (21.8 ft) in diameter and about 8.5 metres (28 ft) high. It was lit by a coal brazier on top of the tower. Morgan Jones, who was twice High Sheriff of Cardiganshire, inherited the lighthouse in 1778; he raised the top of the tower by 6.7 metres (22 ft) and built an iron balcony with railings enclosing the oil-burning lantern. The lantern was glazed all around with square panes and covered by a cupola.

Trinity House took over operation of the lighthouse under the Lighthouses Act 1836 (6 & 7 Will. 4. c. 79), but not without a fight from the original owners, who wanted to protect their investment from a low takeover price. The final price paid was a little over £440,000 a reflection of the huge revenues that were accruing to the owners via shipping dues of 1d (one "old" penny, 1/240th of a pound) per ton from every commercial vessel over 5 tons entering Liverpool. Foreign ships and ships sailing in from foreign ports were liable to double this rate. The dues were payable irrespective of whether or not the vessel actually passed within the range of the light or the time of passing.

The lighthouse was lavishly restored by James Walker, exhibiting two of his characteristics: a decrease in diameter and a solid parapet (as seen at his Trwyn Du Lighthouse). The stone-built gallery was 0.84 metres (2.8 ft) wide and bracketed out on corbels with a crenellated parapet. A new cast-iron lantern, 4.25 metres (13.9 ft) in diameter, was glazed with square panes around a dioptric light with mirrors, later replaced by a lens. On the north side of the tower there is a former external doorway exhibiting the Trinity House coat of arms, which now leads to the engine room.

The light shines at a height of 36 metres (118 ft) above the average high tide, with an intensity of 1,150,000 candelas. It flashes twice every 10 seconds and can be seen 22 nmi (41 km; 25 mi) away. In 1903–4, a solid circular tower, about 3 metres (9.8 ft) in diameter, was added to the south-west side of the main tower to carry a sector light. This shines at an elevation of 26 metres (85 ft) above the sea. The light was automated in 1987 and is now controlled from Holyhead.

Nearby are castellated dwellings having cobbled yards and entrance stairs, along with symmetrically sited privies, a garden, a stone bridge connecting two islets, and a unique stone well-head building. An axial corridor leads from the dwellings to the lighthouse tower's base. The early date of the lighthouse keepers’ cottages makes the buildings of considerable interest. For a number of summers, they have been used by wardens working for the Royal Society for the Protection of Birds.

== See also ==
- List of lighthouses in Wales
- Grade II* listed buildings in Anglesey

== Sources ==
- Hague, D. B., Lighthouses of Wales: Their Architecture and Archaeology, ed. S. Hughes (Royal Commission on the Ancient and Historical Monuments of Wales, 1994) ISBN 1-871184-08-8
