= Cwm Cadnant =

Community in Anglesey, Wales

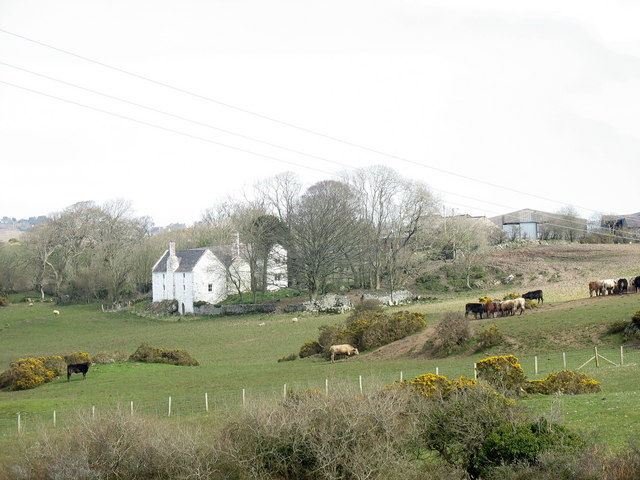
- Hafoty

- Location within Anglesey
- Population: 2,254 (2011)
- OS grid reference: SH5674
- Community: Cwm Cadnant
- Principal area: Anglesey
- Preserved county: Gwynedd
- Country: Wales
- Sovereign state: United Kingdom
- Post town: BEAUMARIS
- Postcode district: LL59
- Dialling code: 01248
- Police: North Wales
- Fire: North Wales
- Ambulance: Welsh
- UK Parliament: Ynys Môn
- Senedd Cymru – Welsh Parliament: Ynys Môn
- List of places UK Wales Anglesey 53.248°N 4.153°W Map of the community

Cwm Cadnant is a community and former electoral ward in Anglesey, north Wales. Named after the local river, Afon Cadnant, which flows through it, the community takes in the area between the Menai Bridge and Beaumaris. The community includes the villages of Llandegfan, Hen Bentref Llandegfan and Llansadwrn as well as the settlement of Bryn-minceg and at the 2001 census it had a population of 2,222, increasing slightly to 2,254 at the 2011 census.

Prior to the 2013 Isle of Anglesey County Council election Cwm Cadnant was an electoral ward in its own right. It is now part of the Seiriol ward, which includes the neighbouring Beaumaris, Llanddona, and Llangoed communities.

The lower part of the Afon Cadnant, which passes through part of Llandegfan is Cadnant Dingle, a Site of Special Scientific Interest. The site was selected as an example of Brachypodium sylvaticum – Quercus/Fraxinus broadleaved woodland.

== Buildings of note ==
The area has a long history with several buildings of note. St Sadwrn's church in the village of Llansadwrn contains a 6th-century memorial to Saint Saturnius after whom the church and subsequently the village is named. The area was once the site of Treffos Manor, the medieval residence of the Bishop of Bangor, but there are no visible remains and the site is now contains an isolated farm house. Cwm Cadnant is also home to Hafotty, described as one of the finest medieval houses on Anglesey. Home to the constable of Beaumaris Castle around the 1530s, Hafotty is believed to have been originally constructed in the second quarter of the 14th century.

Cwm Cadnant also contains several earthworks and standing stones and an ancient clapper bridge over the Cadnant below Cadnant Mill.
