= Victoria Terrace, Beaumaris =

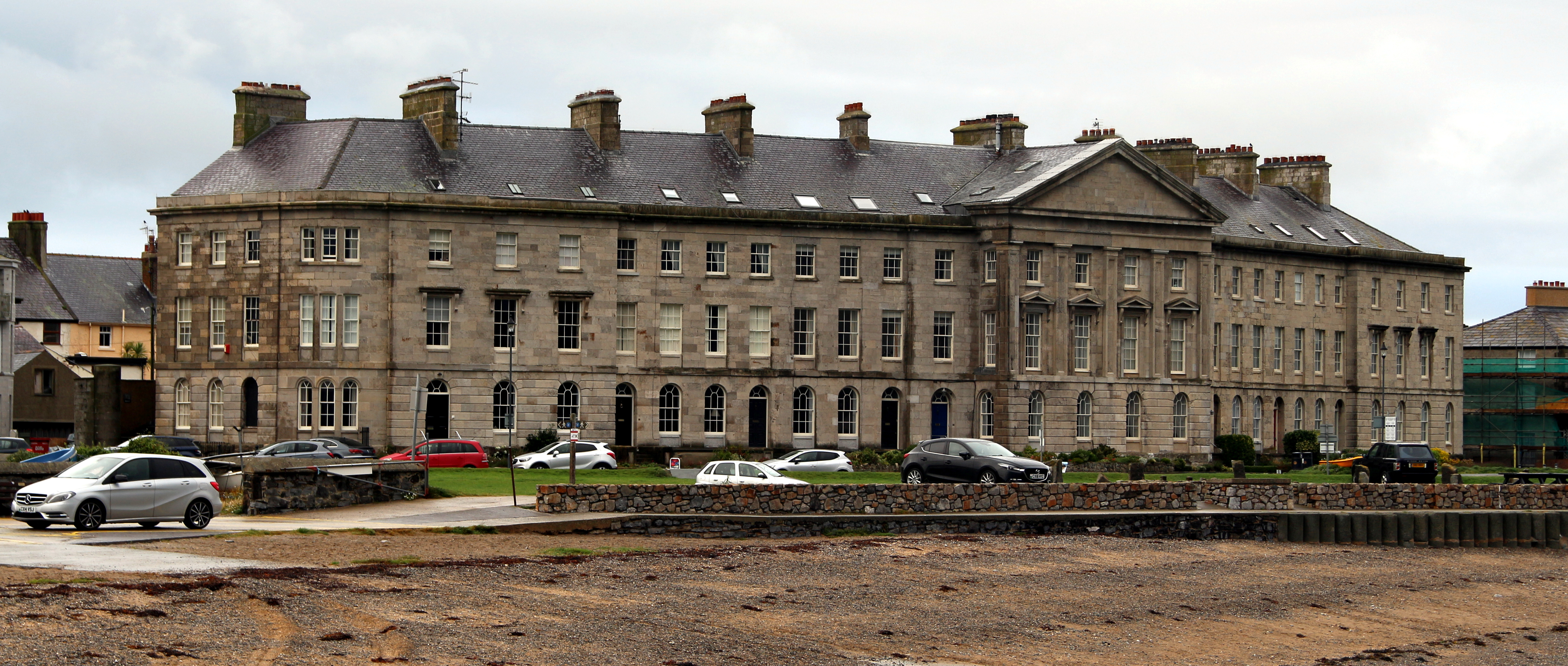
- "an outstanding late-Georgian terrace of national importance"

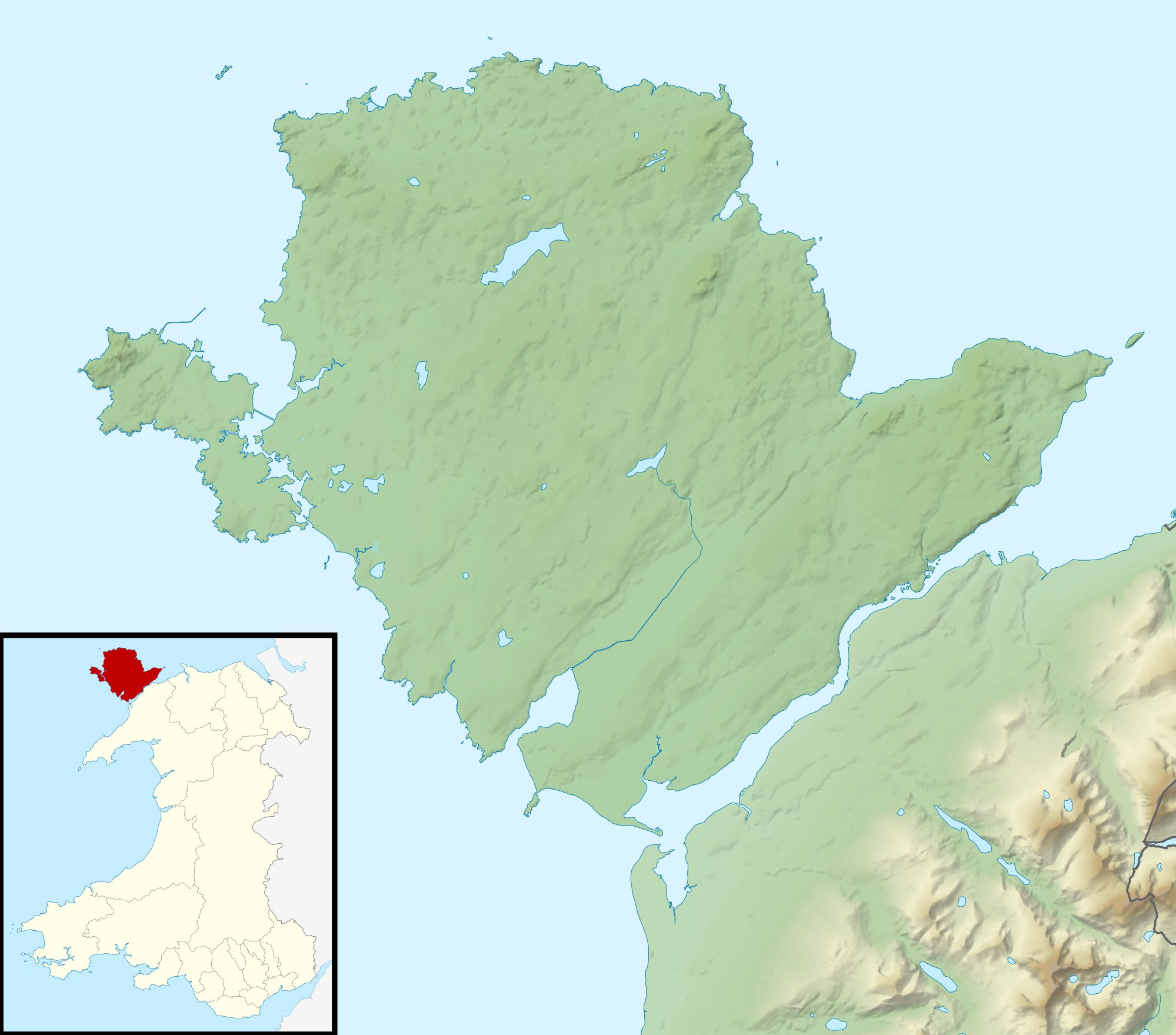
- Location within Anglesey
- 53.2632°N 4.0906°W
- Type: Terrace
- Location: Beaumaris, Anglesey, Wales

History
- Built: 1833

Site notes
- Architect(s): Joseph Hansom, Edward Welch
- Architectural style: Neoclassical
- Governing body: Privately owned

Listed Building – Grade I
- Official name: 1 Victoria Terrace
- Designated: 23 September 1950
- Reference no.: 5636

Victoria Terrace, on the seafront in Beaumaris, Anglesey, Wales is a range of early 19th century townhouses. The terrace was designed by the architectural partnership of Joseph Hansom and Edward Welch for the Beaumaris Corporation. The development was a central part of the corporation's plans to reposition Beaumaris as a fashionable seaside resort in response to its declining maritime trade. The terrace was sold off in the early 20th century and is now divided into nineteen apartments, No. 1 remaining as a single house. This, and each apartment, No.s 2-20 inclusive, is designated a Grade I listed building, the Cadw listing record describing the whole block as "an outstanding and well-preserved late-Georgian terrace of national importance".

== History ==
The town and castle of Beaumaris were created in the late 13th century as part of the Conquest of Wales led by Edward I. Planned in the 1280s, and constructed from 1295 by Edward's master builder, James of St George, the settlement replaced the historic Welsh capital of Llanfaes. Beaumaris's location, and natural harbour, encouraged maritime trade and in the Middle Ages the town flourished as a port and the customs hub for North-West Wales. By the early 19th century this trade was in decline and the town's council sought to reinvent Beaumaris as a seaside resort. A visit to the town by Princess Victoria in 1832 saw the newly built terrace named in her honour. (Note: Princess Victoria and her mother, the Duchess of Kent, stayed at the Bulkeley Hotel, also designed by Hansom, and built specifically to accommodate the royal party.) The houses were let by the corporation to “respectable tenants” for rents of £4 per year.

The terrace was sold off by the Beaumaris Corporation in 1937 and the houses, with the exception of No.1, were each laterally sub-divided into two, upper and lower, apartments. The architect was Sidney Colwyn Foulkes. The apartments remain in private ownership.

== Architecture and description ==
Victoria Terrace is a three-storey block, with basements and attics. The construction material is limestone ashlar. Richard Haslam, Julian Orbach and Adam Voelcker, in their 2009 edition Gywnedd, in the Buildings of Wales series, note that, "the terrace set a marker for Beaumaris which was not to be repeated".

The Cadw listing record for the terrace describes it as "an outstanding and well-preserved late-Georgian terrace of national importance". Each apartment in the terrace is separately designated by Cadw, the statutory body with responsibility for the listing of buildings in Wales, as a Grade I listed building. This is the highest grade and indicates buildings of "exceptional interest".

== Sources ==
- Haslam, Richard; Orbach, Julian; Voelcker, Adam (2009). Gwynedd. The Buildings of Wales. New Haven, US and London: Yale University Press. ISBN 978-0-300-14169-6. OCLC 1023292902.
