= Elen Gwdman =

Elen Gwdman (fl. 1616) was a Welsh female poet and writer of the early 17th-century. Very little is known of her life, but it is thought she may have belonged to a sub-branch of the Woods family from the Tal-y-llyn area, in Anglesey. Gwdman is a rare example of a female poet of the early modern period.

== Work ==
Only one of her poems survives, 'Cwynfan merch ifanc am ei chariad' ('A young girl's complaint about her sweetheart'), a tale of unrequited love in the Welsh language, but it is so finely crafted that it reveals that Gwdman was experienced in composing poetry. The subject of the poem is also very unusual, as it is a passionate love song (that can be sung to the tune 'Rogero') for a young man named Edward Wynn (d. c. 1637) of Bodewryd. From the poem he seems too noble for a girl of Gwdman's modest social status and her love affair is unsuccessful. She says that they talked often as he passed by, and that she thought he felt the same way for her as she did for him. She complains of her misfortune after the young man she loved had to marry another girl who was a more suitable partner. Gwdman vows that she will never love another and will travel to Rome to become a nun.

The poem was probably written in about 1616, in which year Edward Wynn of Bodewyrd married Margaret, the daughter of Edward Puleston of Llwyn-y-Cnotie, the parson of Llanynys. Edward Wynn was Sheriff of Anglesey in 1627–8, and again in 1634–5. In 1631 he paid the fine for not receiving a knight's order. He died on 9 January 1637/8, leaving two sons, John Wynn (1617–1670) and Edward Wynn (1644–1680).
