= St Sadwrn's Church, Llansadwrn =

Coordinates: 53.2601°N 4.1694°W

St Sadwrn's Church
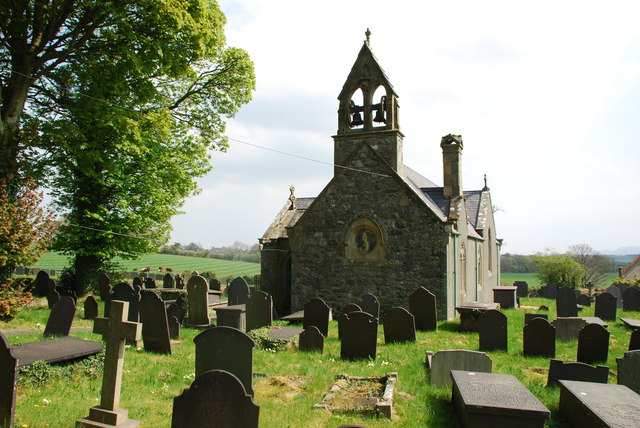
- St Sadwrn's Church
- Country: Wales
- Denomination: Church in Wales

Architecture
- Heritage designation: Grade II*
- Designated: 30 January 1968
- Architectural type: Church
- Style: Medieval

St Sadwrn's Church, Llansadwrn (Welsh: [ɬanˈsadʊrn]) is a church in the village of Llansadwrn, Anglesey, Wales. It is dedicated to the Welsh saint Sadwrn, who is commemorated in a 6th-century inscribed stone inside the church. The current building was built in 1881, on the foundations of a medieval predecessor, to a design by Henry Kennedy of Bangor. It was designated a Grade II*-listed building on 30 January 1968.
