= Sidney Colwyn Foulkes =

Welsh architect (1884–1971)

Sidney Colwyn Foulkes OBE
- Born: 1884; Colwyn Bay
- Died: 2 April 1971
- Occupation: Architect
- Buildings: Colwyn Bay and West Denbighshire Hospital
- Projects: Rydal Penrhos

Sidney Colwyn Foulkes OBE FRIBA FILA AMTPI (1884-1971) was a Welsh architect, especially known for his architectural designs in Colwyn Bay, cinemas and council estates in North Wales. He was one of the first industrial landscape architects in Britain.

== Early years ==
Foulkes was born to Edward Foulkes, a builder, and Susan Cowx in Colwyn Bay, and was christened at St John’s Colwyn Bay Methodist Church in Pwllycrochan Avenue, a building his father had just completed. At the christening it was reported that he received the middle name Colwyn after the minister questioned why he had no middle name.

Foulkes attended the former Conway Road School, and also undertook technical classes held in Douglas Road. This was in addition to working for his father, initially with the building companies horses, and then as a joiner.

In 1900, aged 16, he became the family bread winner, as his father's business was declared bankrupt due to a failed speculative building development in Station Road, Colwyn Bay. His first commission after his father's bankruptcy was for a demountable pierrot stand owned by a Will Catlin, which he was initially asked to just paint, however Foulkes presented a new design and this was accepted.

Foulkes next major paid commission as a designer and builder was the site of a former stables in the middle of Colwyn Bay. The property had been purchased by a Mr Jones, and he had asked Foulkes what could be done with the site. Foulkes had seen a moving picture show in a tent in Abergele, and drew up plans for a cinema and offices. This became the Cosy Cinema in 1910, and Foulkes occupied the offices above free of rent due to the quality of his workmanship.

In 1914 Foulkes applied to join the School of Architecture at the University of Liverpool, and was accepted by Professor Charles Reilly who offered Foulkes a scholarship. While on the course in 1914, he gained a further commission for the Rhos Playhouse cinema in Penryn Avenue, Rhos on Sea.

He completed the course in 1916, with a distinction, and then joined the Royal Naval Air Service. He became Chief Petty Officer in the Aircraft Design Department at Crystal Palace. During this period, Foulkes attended University College London to study under the first Professor of Town Planning, Stanley Adshead, becoming one of the Royal Town Planning Institute's first members.

== Early architectural career ==
Foulkes returned to Colwyn Bay after his military service, and found work hard to come by as most development land was managed by the Pwllycrochan Estate, which exclusively employed the firm Porter and Chadwick. He was also bound by his Associate membership of RIBA, which stipulated he could not be both architect and building contractor.

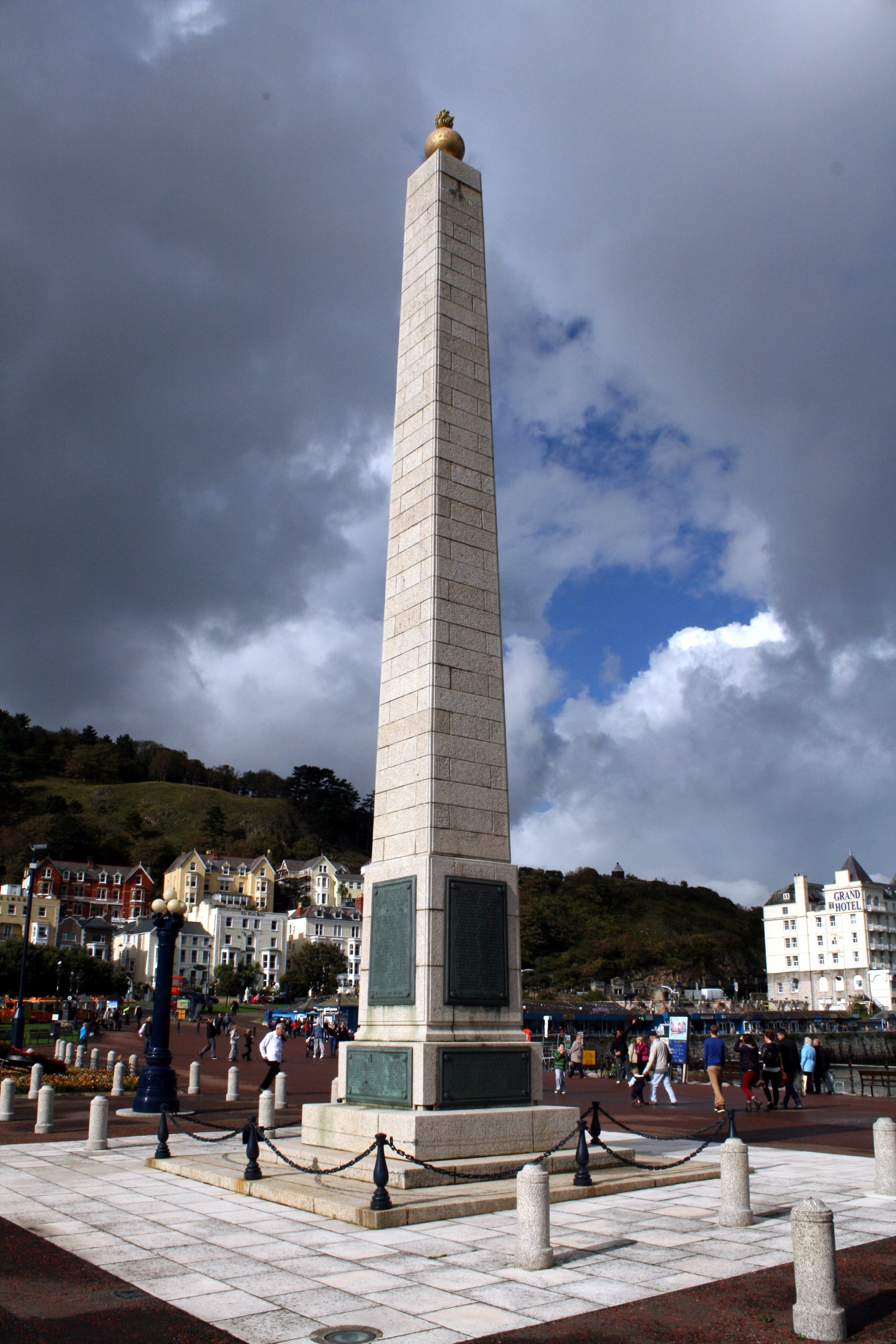
Llandudno Cenotaph

His first commission after the war was again for Will Catlin. Catlin had owned the Arcadia Theatre in Colwyn Bay since 1915 and commissioned Foulkes to design a new building. Foulkes also designed individual houses and several war memorials, including the Obelisk at Llandudno.

His first major project was for the Committee of the Colwyn Bay Cottage Hospital. The committee staged a competition for a new hospital, the Colwyn Bay and West Denbighshire Hospital, after initially asking Foulkes for assistance and for him to recommend the RIBA competition rules. Foulkes won the commission, and after his previous studies of material provided by RIBA, his design included the American-style centrally located sluices instead of the Florence Nightingale end sluice design for wards. At the end of the build the management committee presented a two-chime engraved carriage clock to Foulkes in 1925.

This was followed by designing new buildings for Rydal Penrhos, W. S. Woods department store (Station Road), Williams Deacon's Bank (Conwy Road) and Longmans Bookshop (7 Abergele Road]) in Colwyn Bay. In 1931, Foulkes was given an Honouary Masters in Architecture by the University of Liverpool. During the 1930s Foulkes designed many cinemas across North Wales. This included the Rhos Playhouse, the Plazas in Rhyl, Flint, and Queensferry, and the Regent in Rhyl. In 1937, his design for the Palace in Conwy won the Cinema of the Year Award. In the same year, he undertook the redesign and renovation of the Victoria Terrace, Beaumaris, which was sold off by the Beaumaris Corporation that year. In 1939 Foulkes was elected as a Fellow of RIBA, and became the President of the North Wales Society of Architects, a position he held until 1944. During World War II, he designed a factory for the Ministry of Aircraft Production in Llandudno Junction for Radcliffe Engineering.

== Career after World War II ==
After the war, Foulkes worked on several housing projects, the first at Beaumaris. It was at Beaumaris that Foulkes showed his innovation, by ignoring the Ministry of Health bylaws and designing his ceiling heights at 7 ft 6 instead of 8 ft. In 1948, the estate was opened by Aneurin Bevan, the minister for housing. Bevan questioned the ceiling height. Foulkes argued that the lower height made the rooms better proportioned, cheaper to heat and saved several courses of bricks (which were in short supply). Bevan agreed and the byelaw was changed shortly afterwards. He designed further estates in Wrexham, Llanrwst and Rhos on Sea. Clough Williams-Ellis wrote in his autobiography of Foulkes' design:

...his sense of background and meticulous care for apt materials and appropriate detailing set a standard that has not been without its effect in raising those of others less sensitive than himself.

His design at Beaumaris won a Ministry of Housing Bronze Medal in 1950, and Elwy Estate in Rhos on Sea in 1962 won a Civic Trust Award. In the 1957 Birthday Honours, Foulkes was appointed an Officer of the Order of the British Empire (OBE) for "services to architecture in Wales". Further architectural work after the war included the replacement for the Aberystwyth Town Hall, which had burnt down, and The Brecon Beacons Mountain Centre.

During the post-war period, Foulkes became one of the first architects in industrial Landscape Architecture. Foulkes was recommended to the British Electricity Authority by Sir Patrick Abercrombie to be the landscape consultant for the extension of the Dolgarrog power station. His design won a Civil Trust Award. This work led to further commissions, including a pump storage hydro-electric scheme at Blaenau Ffestiniog and the Dinorwig pump storage scheme, while his work at Rheidol Falls above Aberystwyth won another Civic Trust Award. Foulkes work was recognised by being made a Fellow of the Institute of Landscape Architecture. Foulkes acted as a consultant for bodies including Birmingham Water Board, Devon County Council and Manchester Corporation Water Authority.

== Personal life and death ==
Foulkes was married to Daisy Charney and they had five children. Their son Ralph was also an architect, and his wife Elizabeth Colwyn Foulkes was appointed a Member of the Order of the British Empire (MBE) for her work in architecture. Foulkes was a member of the Council for the Protection of Rural Wales and of the Historic buildings council for Wales. In 1966, Foulkes was awarded the Freedom of the Borough by Conwy Council. Foulkes died on 2 April 1971 in Colwyn Bay. On his death Clough Williams-Ellis wrote:

Whenever I could I would take distinguished visiting architects and critics (Frank Lloyd Wright and Lewis Mumford amongst them) to see both him and examples of his work – sure of their warm approval and admiration of both, in support of my own.

== Legacy ==
Colwyn Foulkes is commemorated by one of a series of 12 granite "postcards" embedded into the promenade at Colwyn Bay.

His building at 7, Abergele Road, Colwyn Bay is Grade II listed.

A planning application reported in October 2021 that a Foulkes-designed house on the corner of Marine Drive and College Avenue in Rhos on Sea should be demolished to make way for an apartment building and car parking resulted in calls for its preservation.
