= Melin Hywel =

Corn mill in Anglesey, Wales

Coordinates: 53°19′53″N 4°28′41″W

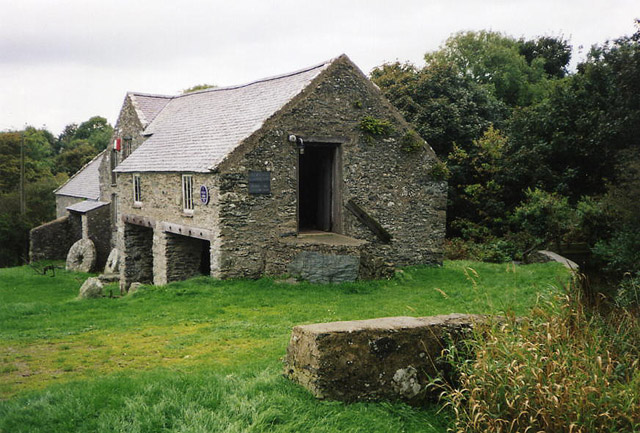
Melin Hywel in September 1999

Melin Hywel (Welsh for 'Howell's mill'), known locally as Felin Selar (Welsh for 'Selar mill'), is a 14th century Grade II* listed water-powered corn mill located near Afon Alaw in Llanddeusant, Anglesey, Wales.

== History ==
A mill was reported on this site in 1352. The original building was extended in 1850 and extensively restored in the early 1970s, at the time it was the only working mill in Anglesey.

In 1971, the building gained its Grade II* listing for its "immense vernacular character and particular importance".

In 1975, the mill was opened to the public for the first time. After being closed, by 2009 it started to show signs of vandalism, with most of the windows being smashed. Most of its internal machinery remained intact. In 1985, the mill underwent a full restoration project, which was recognised with a Conservation Award by the Royal Institution of Chartered Surveyors.

In 2016, the building was put up on the market for £175,000 in hopes of being restored by its buyer. In 2020, Richard Holt, a pâtisserie chef, bought the mill with plans to restore it as a museum over the next three years, while having it be open to the public.
