= Castell Aberlleiniog =

Castle in Anglesey, Wales

Aberlleiniog Castle
- Castell Aberlleiniog (Welsh)
- Anglesey; Near Llangoed in Wales
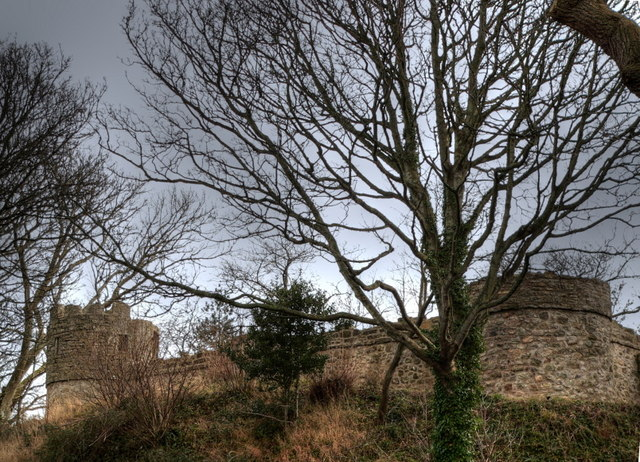
- Two of the castle's towers and keep wall in 2009, after restoration had begun

Site information
- Type: Castle
- Open to the public: Yes
- Condition: Ruined, Undergoing Restoration

Location
- Location in Wales
- Coordinates: 3166-2:GB-WLS 53°17′33″N 4°4′38″W

Site history
- Built: 1080–1099
- Built by: Hugh d'Avranches
- In use: Late 11th Century-mid 17th Century

Castell Aberlleiniog (Welsh for 'castle of the mouth of the Lleiniog') is a motte and bailey fortress near the village of Llangoed on the Isle of Anglesey, in Wales, built between 1080 and 1099 by Hugh d'Avranches, 1st Earl of Chester. It is about two miles distant from Beaumaris Castle, and was built atop a very steep hill.

== History ==
Castell Aberlleiniog is built in a strategic position beside the Menai Strait opposite the Norman castle at Abergwyngregyn, showing that visual communication was important to the Norman invaders. It was probably erected by Hugh d'Avranches, 1st Earl of Chester, when he conquered Gwynedd in 1088. There are few historical documents that detail the events the castle has seen through its life, however some do survive, including a record of a siege in 1094 by Gruffudd ap Cynan on his return from Ireland. The siege was successful, 124 Norman defenders died in the battle. Gruffudd was later successful in driving Hugh out, and after this, Anglesey remained under the control of the Welsh until the arrival of Edward I two hundred years later. It is not known whether they made use of Castell Aberlleiniog.

The original Norman timber structure is long gone, replaced by a stone structure at some point prior to the mid-17th century, when it was destroyed by Thomas Cheadle, the constable of Beaumaris. The site was restored from 2008 and is (2016) open to the public. The keep had broad ramparts fronted by a narrow wall rising to a parapet; each corner contained a round tower, the remains of which can still be seen.

== See also ==
- List of castles in Wales
- Castles in Great Britain and Ireland
