= Massey Sisters =

Welsh artists

Edith Ellen Henrietta Massey (1863–1946) and Gwenddolen Elizabeth Evileen Massey (1864–1960), known as the Massey Sisters, were two Welsh artists and botanists who created a unique record of the plant-life of Anglesey in the late 19th and early 20th century.

== Life and career ==
Edith and Gwenddolen Massey were born on the island of Anglesey, off the coast of North Wales. They lived at Cornelyn Manor, near Llangoed, a country house built in 1861 by their father William Massey (1817–1897), who was Deputy Lieutenant and later High Sheriff of Anglesey (1864).

Historian John Smith has written that the sisters had a "remarkable" talent for making detailed and exceptional botanical studies despite the fact that it appears they had little training. Edith gathered the flower and plant specimens while her younger sister Gwenddolen painted them in watercolours. They are known to have painted more than 500 studies, annotated with the species names in Welsh, English and Latin. Gwenddolen died aged 96 in October 1960 and is buried with her sister and family at St Seiriol's Church, Penmon.

Neither sister married or had children and their estate was inherited by their nearest surviving relative Sybil Mary, whose mother was a niece to the Massey Sisters' mother. After Mary's death, the collection of watercolour paintings was bought at auction by Anglesey Borough Council for £2,000 in 1982. Together with the previously acquired collection of works of Charles Tunnicliffe, this formed the start of the island's museum service, according to John Smith.

== Reception ==
The sisters' paintings are held by Oriel Ynys Môn in Llangefni, where a selection of them are on permanent display.

In 2010, the University of Cardiff funded a five-year research project led by author Tristan Hughes to promote knowledge of the Massey sisters to the wider public and to place their work in its historical context.
