= Aberystwyth Town Hall =

Municipal Building in Aberystwyth, Wales

- Neuadd y Dref Aberystwyth (Welsh)
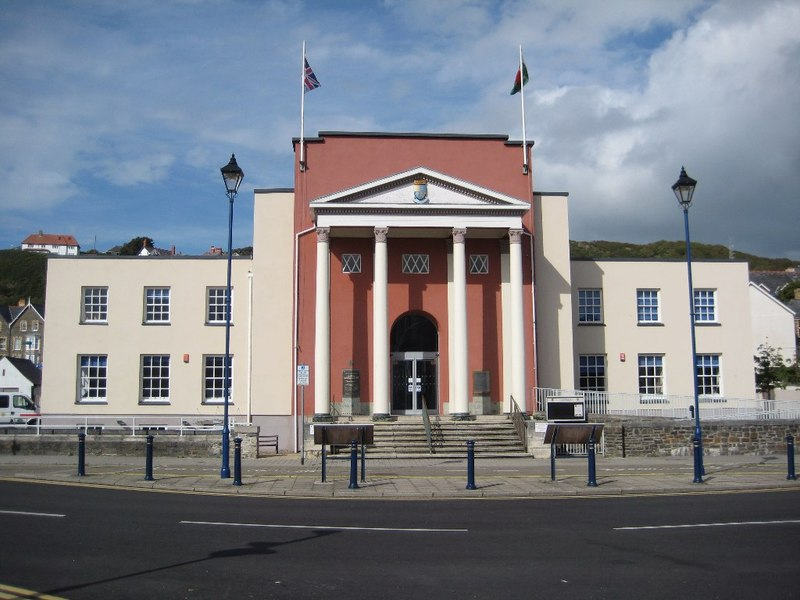
- Aberystwyth Town Hall

- Shown in Ceredigion
- 52.4173°N 4.0816°W
- Location: Queen's Square, Aberystwyth

History
- Built: 1962

Site notes
- Architect: Sidney Colwyn Foulkes
- Architectural style: Neo-Georgian style

Aberystwyth Town Hall (Welsh: Neuadd y Dref Aberystwyth) is a municipal structure in Queen's Square, Aberystwyth, Wales. The structure, which was the headquarters of Aberystwyth Borough Council, has operated since 2012 as a public library and a pensioners' day centre.

== History ==
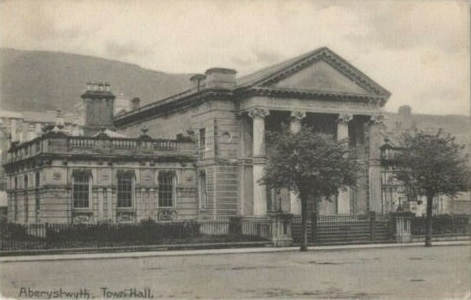
Coulthart's town hall of 1851

The first town hall in Aberystwyth, which was located at the top of Great Darkgate Street, was completed in the 18th century. It was replaced by a new building at the top of Portland Street which was designed by William Coulthart in the Neo-Georgian style, built in ashlar stone and was completed in 1851. The design involved a symmetrical main frontage with nine bays facing onto Queen's Square; the central section of three bays formed a full-height tetrastyle portico with Ionic order columns supporting an entablature and a modillioned pediment; there were single storey sections on either side with sash windows and a balustrade at roof level. Internally, one of the principal rooms was the courtroom which was used once a year for the quarter sessions. This building was badly damaged in a fire on 10 September 1957.

After the fire-damaged building had been demolished, a third town hall, designed by Sidney Colwyn Foulkes in a similar style to the second building was built on the same site by The Norwest Construction Company and officially opened by the Lord Mayor of Cardiff, Edward Ewart Pearce, on 2 May 1962. However, there were differences: the new building incorporated a high wall behind the new portico so accentuating its profile, the new pediment featured a coat of arms in the tympanum and the detailing on the new side sections was minimal.

The building continued to serve as the headquarters of the Aberystwyth Borough Council for much of the rest of the 20th century and remained the meeting place of the enlarged Ceredigion District Council after it was formed in 1974. However, it ceased to be the local seat of government when the new unitary authority, Ceredigion County Council, was formed at Aberaeron in 1996. Ceredigion County Council continued to use the building for the delivery of local services but moved out to new offices on Boulevard St Brieuc in 2009.

An extensive programme of works to establish a new library and a new pensioners' day centre in the town hall started in September 2010. (Note: The first public library in the town was established at Compton House in Pier Street in October 1874. It moved to the Assembly Rooms in Laura Place in 1882, to the Old Banking Library in Pier Street in 1903, and, following a grant from the Scottish-American industrialist and philanthropist, Andrew Carnegie, to Corporation Street in April 1906.) The conversion, which cost £950,000, was completed in April 2012 and the building was officially re-opened by the Minister for Housing, Regeneration & Heritage, Huw Lewis, on 13 September 2012. The new library was named the Alun R. Edwards centre (Welsh: Canolfan Alun R. Edwards) in memory of the former county librarian, Alun R. Edwards who died in 1986. However, the move of the pensioners' day centre to the basement of the town hall was controversial and led to protests outside the old day centre in Park Avenue and a petition, which gained 6,000 signatures, to the Senedd.
