= St Mary's Church, Tal-y-llyn =

Coordinates: 53.227717°N 4.448388°W

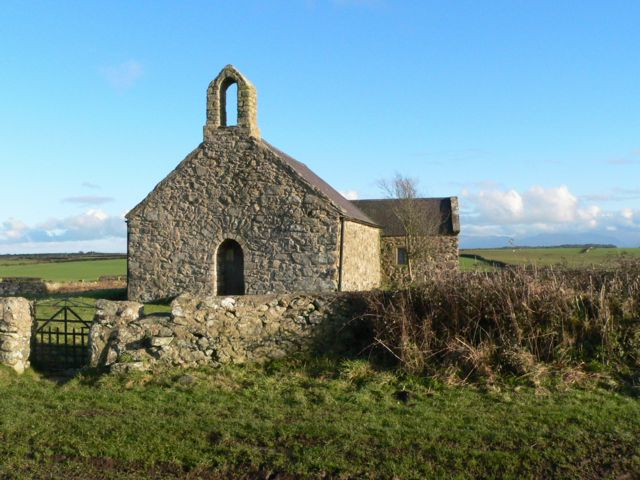
- The west end of St Mary's Church, showing the entrance door

- Location in Anglesey
- Location: Tal-y-llyn, Anglesey
- Country: Wales
- Denomination: Church in Wales

History
- Status: Chapel of ease
- Founded: Unknown; building possibly 12th century
- Dedication: St Mary

Architecture
- Functional status: Redundant church in the care of the Friends of Friendless Churches; occasional summer services
- Heritage designation: Grade I
- Designated: 5 April 1971
- Architectural type: Church
- Style: Medieval

Specifications
- Length: Nave: 25 ft (7.6 m); Chancel: 16 ft 6 in (5.0 m)
- Width: Nave: 13 ft (4.0 m); Chancel: 11 ft (3.4 m)
- Materials: Rubble masonry with boulder quoins

St Mary's Church, Tal-y-llyn is a medieval church near Aberffraw in Anglesey, north Wales. It was originally a chapel of ease for the parish church of St Peulan's, Llanbeulan, but the township that it once served, Tal-y-llyn, no longer exists. It was declared a redundant church in the early 1990s, and has been in the care of the Friends of Friendless Churches since 1999. Services are held once per month during part of the year.

The date of the church is unknown, but the oldest parts could be from the 12th century. The chancel was rebuilt in the 16th century, and a side chapel added in the 17th century. The church furnishings, such as pews, pulpit and communion rails, were added in the 18th century, although some of the pews are modern replacements after vandalism. It is a Grade I listed building, a national designation given to buildings of "exceptional, usually national, interest", because it is "a very rare example of a virtually unrestored Medieval church of simple, rustic character."

== History and location ==
St Mary's Church is in a rural and thinly populated part of Anglesey, about 4.25 kilometres (2.6 mi) northeast of Aberffraw and about 3.75 kilometres (2.3 mi) southwest of Gwalchmai. It stands on a low mound with a circumference of approximately 120 yards (110 m); the wall around the churchyard, which contains no gravestones, follows the shape of the mound to some extent. Its original purpose was to serve as one of five chapels of ease for the local parish church, St Peulan's, Llanbeulan, about 1.5 miles (2.4 km) to the north; St Peulan's itself has now closed. The township that St Mary's served, Tal-y-llyn, has now disappeared, although before the time of the Black Death there were 22 houses here.

The date of foundation of the church is unknown. The nave is the oldest part of the church, possibly built in the 12th century. Later changes saw the rebuilding of the chancel (in the late 16th century) and the addition of a chapel on the south side of the building (in the 17th century). It was used for services until the early 1990s, and was then made a redundant church in about 1992. It was placed in the care of the Friends of Friendless Churches in 1999, who hold a 999-year lease effective from 19 November 1999. Services are held in the church on one Sunday afternoon per month between May and October.

== Architecture and fittings ==
The church was constructed using rubble masonry with boulder quoins. The floor is laid with flagstones throughout, and the roof has modern slates. The nave measures 25 by 13 feet (7.6 by 4.0 m), the chancel measures 16 feet 6 inches by 11 feet (5.03 by 3.47 m), and the chapel adjoining the chancel on the south side is 9 by 8 feet (2.7 by 2.4 m). Between the nave and chancel is a pointed arch, with some 13th-century elements but probably reconstructed in the 16th century. The side chapel has rectangular windows in the east and west walls from the 17th century; a narrow stone bench runs along the west and south walls of the chapel. The roof trusses, which date from the 15th and 17th centuries, are visible inside the building and the undersides are chamfered. There are two rectangular windows in the north wall of the nave (20th century additions), matching the window in the north wall of the chancel. The east window, in the chancel, has three rounded lights set in a square frame; it dates from the latter part of the 16th century. The windows still have their clear leaded glass but are now boarded up. There are no windows on the south side, which is the most exposed side. There is an empty bellcote on the roof at the west end of the nave. The entrance is also at the west end, where there is a rounded arch doorway set deep into the thick wall, possibly dating from the 14th century.

The 12th-century font was removed when the church was made redundant; it is now in the nearby church of St Maelog, Llanfaelog. The church now houses a 15th-century octagonal font made of gritstone, positioned on an octagonal stem. The communion rails are dated 1764 and is of a simple design; the pulpit, also 18th-century, has recessed panels.

There are stone benches along the north and south walls of the nave. Many of the pews, which dated from the 18th century, were vandalised or stolen after the church was made redundant. Replacements were made by a local craftsman as part of the restoration project carried out in 1999 and 2000 by the Friends of Friendless Churches.

== Assessment ==
St Mary's has national recognition and statutory protection from alteration as it has been designated as a Grade I listed building – the highest grade of listing, designating buildings of "exceptional, usually national, interest". Fewer than 2% of the listed buildings in Wales are in this category. It was given this status on 5 April 1971, because it is "a very rare example of a virtually unrestored Medieval church of simple, rustic character." Cadw (the Welsh Assembly Government body responsible for the built heritage of Wales and the inclusion of Welsh buildings on the statutory lists) also note as a reason for listing "the retention of a complete set of 18th century fittings, including simple benches", although this comment predates the 1990s vandalism. One modern guide to the buildings of the region comments that it has "the vernacular character of Anglesey's country buildings, which survives scarcely at all in the churches." The 19th-century writer Samuel Lewis, however, took a different view of the building, calling it "a small edifice of no interest".
