= Hafotty =

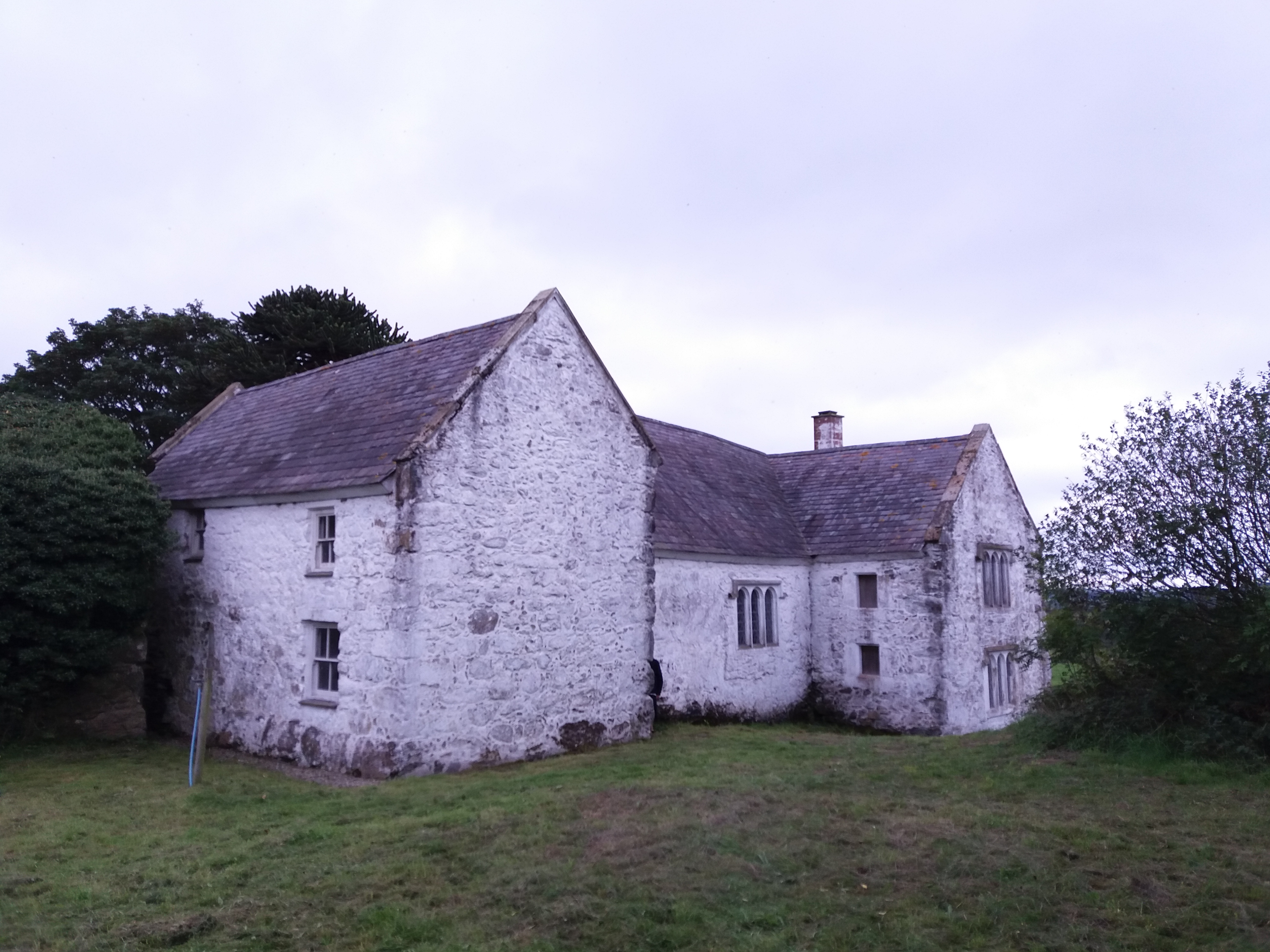
- "One of Anglesey's classic small medieval houses"

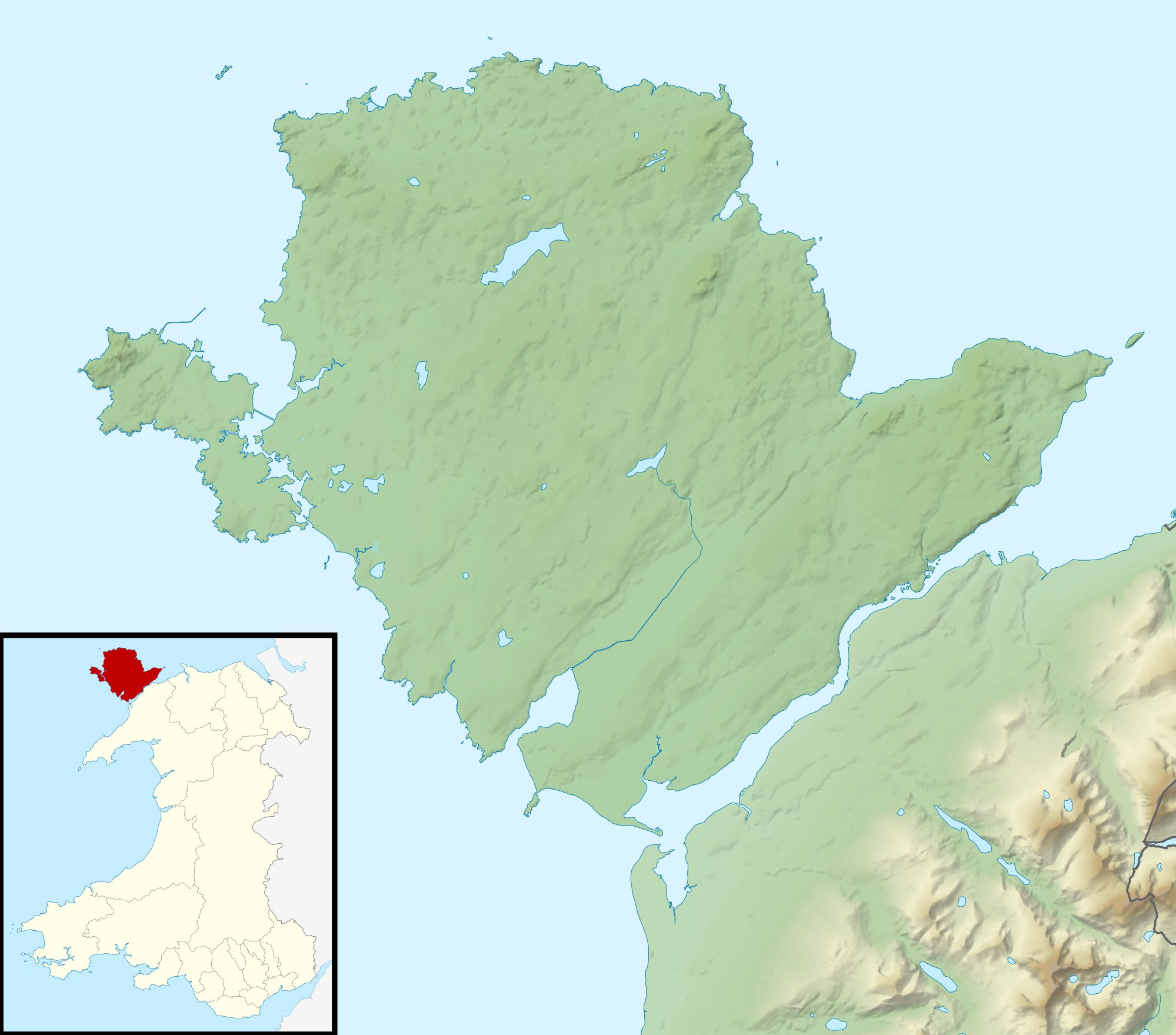
- Location within Anglesey
- 53.281°N 4.1581°W
- Type: House
- Location: Llansadwrn, Anglesey

History
- Built: 14th century

Site notes
- Architectural style: Vernacular
- Governing body: Privately owned

Listed Building – Grade I
- Official name: Hafotty
- Designated: 28 May 2003
- Reference no.: 81136

Scheduled monument
- Official name: Hafoty Old Farm House
- Reference no.: AN097

Listed Building – Grade II
- Official name: Agriculture range at Hafotty
- Designated: 28 May 2003
- Reference no.: 81130

Hafotty, Llansadwrn, Anglesey, Wales is a medieval hall house dating from the mid 14th century. Described in the Gwynedd Pevsner as "one of Anglesey's classic small medieval houses", Hafotty is a Grade I listed building and a scheduled monument.

== History ==
The original house at Hafotty was built of wood. This house is recorded as "Bodiordderch" ("the house of Iordderch"), and has also been called 'Bodarddar'. Anthony Emery dates this wooden house to the second quarter of the 14th century. Its original owner was Thomas Norres from Lancashire. In 1535 the house was in the possession of Henry Norris, Constable of Beaumaris Castle. (Note: Although Cadw record the house as still being in the possession of Henry Norris in 1535, Pevsner suggests that it had passed to the Bulkeleys by 1511.) By the 16th century, Hafotty had passed to the Bulkeleys, another prominent North Wales family, (Note: The Bulkeleys are commemorated on the island by the Bulkeley Monument, on the Beaumaris to Llanddona road, and by the Bulkeley Hotel and Bulkeley Terrace, both in the town of Beaumaris.) and had acquired its present name, meaning summer house, or summer dairy. Cadw records extensions to the house in the 16th century, and its re-casing in stone in the 17th. By the 20th century, Hafotty was in a state of some dereliction, but was restored in the 1970s and again in the early 21st century. The house remains in the possession of the Bulkeleys, although under the care of Cadw, and is occasionally open to the public.

== Architecture and description ==
The Gwynedd Pevsner considers Hafotty "one of Anglesey's classic small medieval houses". Peter Smith, in his Houses of the Welsh Countryside, categorises it as a three-unit hall house and notes that, despite its "relatively modest" size, it was still a "house of status". Built to an H-plan, and constructed of rubble masonry, it is of two-storeys. Dendrochronology from tree rings dates the beams in the extension to between 1509 and 1553. The interior contains some notable medieval fittings, including fireplaces and window surrounds. The fireplace has a Tudor arch and the inscription in Latin: Si deus nobiscum, quis contra nos ('If God is with us, who can be against us') which is a Bulkeley family motto. The arch also has carvings of the heads of a Saracen and a bull, another Bulkeley family motif. Hafotty is a Grade I listed building and a scheduled monument.

== Sources ==
- Emery, Anthony (2008). Greater Medieval Houses of England and Wales, 1300–1500: East Anglia, Central England, and Wales. Cambridge: Cambridge University Press. ISBN 978-0521581318.
- Haslam, Richard; Orbach, Julian; Voelcker, Adam (2009). Gwynedd. The Buildings of Wales. New Haven, US and London: Yale University Press. ISBN 978-0-300-14169-6. OCLC 1023292902.
- Kovach, Warren (2017). Anglesey in 50 Buildings. Stroud, UK: Amberley Publishing. ISBN 978-1445672564.
- Smith, Peter (1975). Houses of the Welsh Countryside. London: Her Majesty's Stationery Office. ISBN 0-11-700475-8. OCLC 868639211.
