= St Morhaiarn's Church, Gwalchmai =

Coordinates: 53.2575°N 4.4143°W

St Morhaiarn's Church
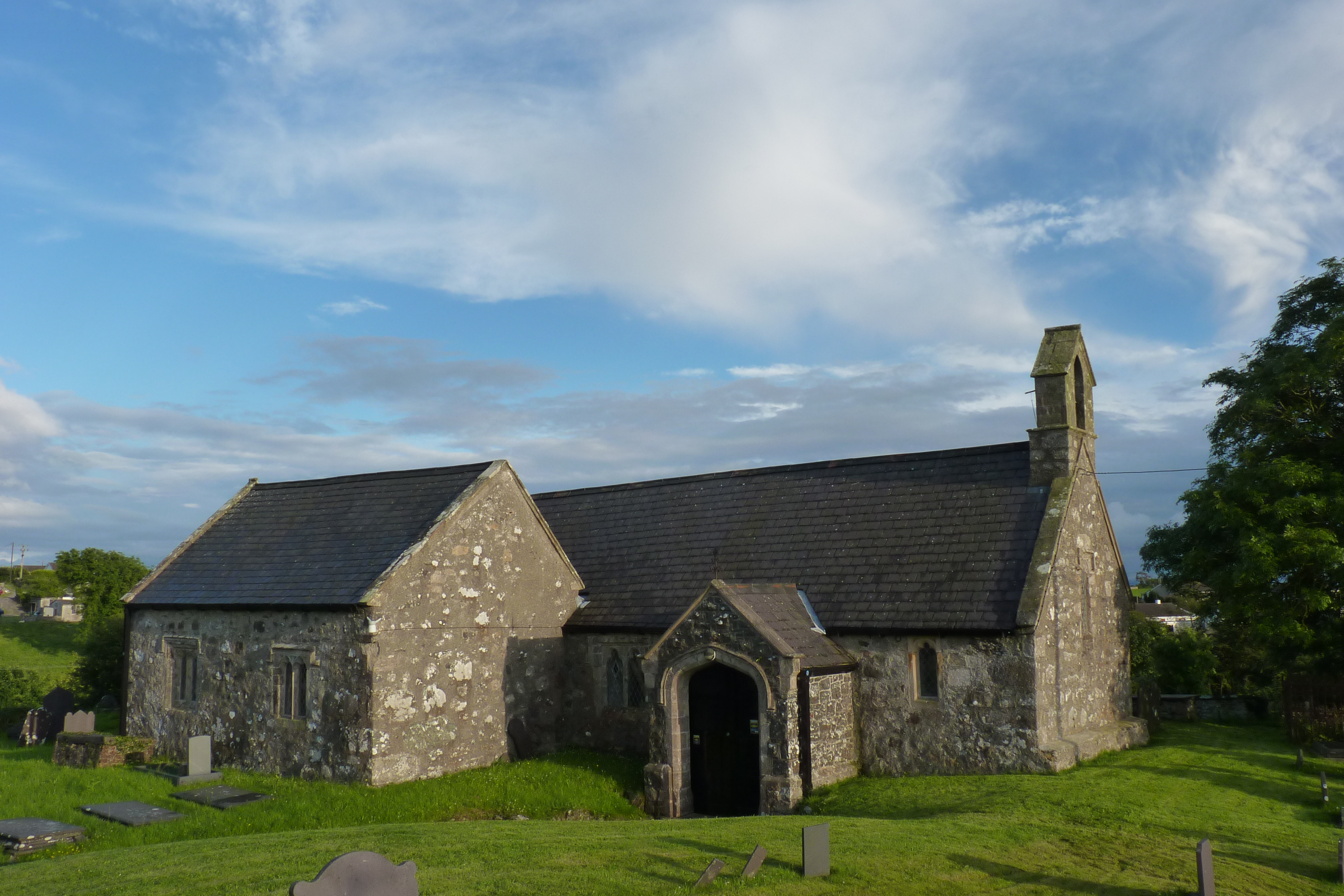

- Country: Wales
- Denomination: Church in Wales

Architecture
- Heritage designation: Grade II*
- Designated: 4 May 1971
- Architectural type: Church
- Style: Medieval

St Morhaiarn's Church is a medieval church in the village of Gwalchmai in Anglesey, Wales. The building dates from the 14th century and underwent extensive renovations in 1845 by Reverend J. Wynne Jones. It was designated a Grade II*-listed building on 4 May 1971.
