= Gwalchmai, Anglesey =

Gwalchmai
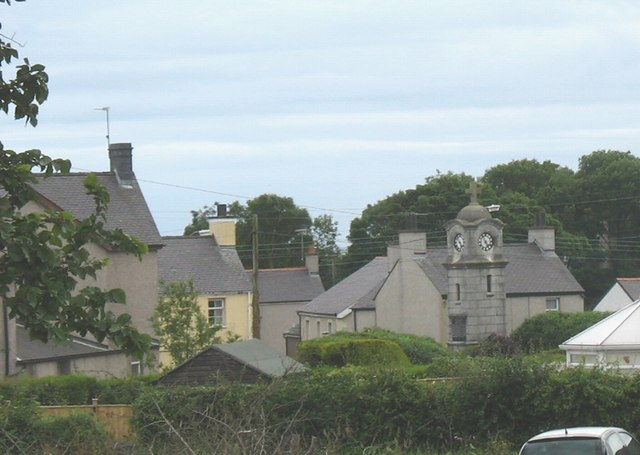
- The centre of Lower Gwalchmai village

- Location within Anglesey
- Population: 1,009 (2011)
- Principal area: Anglesey
- Preserved county: Gwynedd
- Country: Wales
- Sovereign state: United Kingdom
- Post town: LLANGEFNI
- Postcode district: LL65
- Police: North Wales
- Fire: North Wales
- Ambulance: Welsh
- UK Parliament: Ynys Môn
- Senedd Cymru – Welsh Parliament: Bangor Conwy Môn
- List of places UK Wales Anglesey 53.2593454°N 4.417015°W Map of the Trewalchmai community

Gwalchmai (Welsh pronunciation) is a village on Anglesey in north Wales, within the Trewalchmai community.

The community's population in the 2011 census was 1009. The village is considered to be named after the 12th-century court poet Gwalchmai ap Meilyr, whose own name may be derived from that of the Welsh hero known as Gwalchmei ap Gwyar, who became the Gawain of later Arthurian legend.

== Location ==
Gwalchmai is a village along the A5 adjacent to the A55, less than a mile from the Anglesey Show Ground and less than two miles from RAF Mona.

== Amenities and history ==
There are the remains of a windmill in the southern part of the village and a communications tower just north of the village. Llyn Hendref (The Lake of Winter Dwelling) is a small lake to the north-east. The village consists of two distinct parts, Gwalchmai Uchaf (Upper Gwalchmai) which is the south-east section and Gwalchmai Isaf (Lower Gwalchmai) which is the north-west section. On the village clock are inscribed the names of the 29 people from the village who died in World War I and the nine who died in World War II. In 2015 the 90 year old memorial received a grant of £5,000 to be restored. The local association football team, C.P.D. Gwalchmai, won the 2009–2010 Gwynedd League championship and were promoted to the Welsh Alliance League.

Gwalchmai facilities include a village shop, a pub called the Gwalchmai Hotel, a mechanic / car sales business, a doctors' surgery, a church, two chapels, and a community hall. The village primary school is called Ysgol y Ffridd. Features near the village include a recycling centre, a stone quarry, Anglesey Showground, Mona Business Park, and Mona Airfield..

According to the 2001 Census the community of Trewalchmai had 898 people and 367 dwellings. The area retains a strong Welsh character with 75% of the ward population being recorded as Welsh speakers in the 2001 Census.

The ward (which includes Gwalchmai and Bryngwran) is represented on Anglesey County Council by Councillor Bob Parry OBE, who leads the Plaid Cymru Group. Trewalchmai Community Council normally meets on a monthly basis to consider local issues.

The village hosted several matches of the 2019 Inter Games Football Tournament, a replacement football tournament for the popular Island Games. The games were held in Gibraltar but due to lack of pitches there Anglesey was deemed to be a better host.

== See also ==
- St Morhaiarn's Church, Gwalchmai
