= Tal-y-llyn, Anglesey =

Former township in Anglesey, Wales

Coordinates: 53.227717°N 4.448388°W

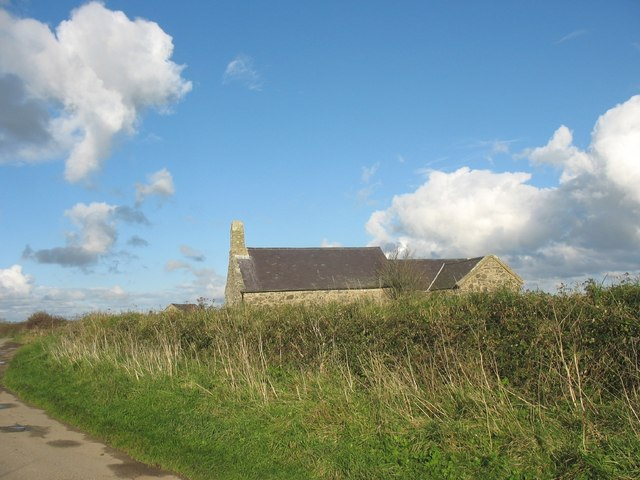
The church of St Mary, Tal-y-llyn

Tal-y-llyn is the name of a former township on the island of Anglesey, north-west Wales. It was located about 4.25 kilometres (3 mi) to the northeast of Aberffraw. In 1306, when a survey was carried out of the lands held by the Bishop of Bangor, Tal-y-llyn was recorded as having three free tenants, who together had about 60 acres (24 ha), and nineteen unfree tenants, who held about 90 acres (36 ha) between them. This would suggest a total population for the community of 110 individuals. However, the population declined in the fourteenth century, the period of the Black Death. St Mary, Tal-y-llyn, the chapel of ease that used to serve the community, remains. The oldest parts of the church date from the twelfth century. St Mary's, which is a Grade I listed building – the highest grade of listing, designating buildings of "exceptional, usually national, interest" – has been in the care of the Friends of Friendless Churches since 1999.

== Notable people ==
- Elen Gwdman (fl. 1609) a Welsh female poet, a rare example of a female poet of the early modern period.
