= Edward Welch (architect) =

British architect (1806–1868)

Edward Welch (1806 – 3 August 1868) was a British architect born in Overton, Flintshire, North Wales. A pupil of John Oates at Halifax, West Yorkshire, he formed a partnership in 1828 with Joseph Hansom, who later invented the hansom cab and founded The Builder. Together they designed several churches in Yorkshire and Liverpool, and also worked on the Isle of Anglesey. In 1831 they won the competition to design Birmingham Town Hall. However, they were obliged to stand surety for the builders, which led to their bankruptcy and the dissolution of the partnership in 1834. In 1835 Welch prepared plans for Benjamin Gummow for the partial rebuilding of St Mary's Church, Ruabon.

Hansom & Welch designed a number of buildings on the Isle of Man, most notably King William's College, where Welch's brother John Welch also designed several churches. Edward Welch also designed Christ Church, a large church in Harpurhey, Manchester. This church was built on the Harpurhey side of the toll gate to allow congregations to go to church, without having to go into the city and pay the toll charge.

Following his parting of ways with Hansom, Welch returned to Liverpool, where he continued to practise as an architect until 1849. He died in London on 3 August 1868.
