= Llansadwrn, Anglesey =

Village on Anglesey, Wales

Coordinates: 53.2668°N 4.1549°W

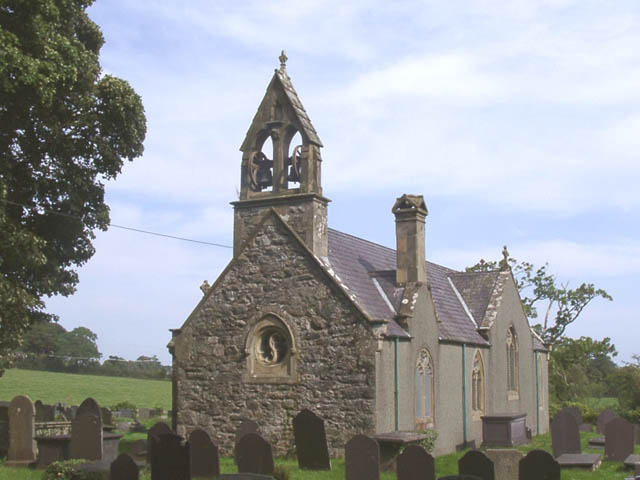
Church of St Sadwrn

Llansadwrn (Welsh: [ɬanˈsadʊrn]; Welsh pronunciation) is a small village in the community of Cwm Cadnant in south-east Anglesey, in north-west Wales. It lies between Menai Bridge, Pentraeth and Beaumaris. It is named after the church, founded in the sixth century by Saint Saturninus, who together with his wife, is commemorated by an early Christian monument. Until 1984, Llansadwrn was a community.

St Sadwrn's Church is a Grade II*-listed building.

The village was the birthplace of Wyn Roberts, Baron Roberts of Conwy who was a Conservative front-bencher for many years.

Close to the village was the site of the excavations that revealed the existence of Bryn Eryr Iron Age farmstead.

== Notable people ==
Andrew Crombie Ramsay (31 January 1814 – 9 December 1891) was a Scottish geologist. He died at Beaumaris in Anglesey and is buried at St Sadwrn's church, Llansadwrn, where a glacial erratic boulder marks his grave.

== Bibliography ==
V. E. Nash-Williams, The Early Christian Monuments of Wales, Cardiff, 1950 .
