= Llangoed =

Village and community in Anglesey, Wales

Coordinates: 53.293°N 4.088°W

- Village and community
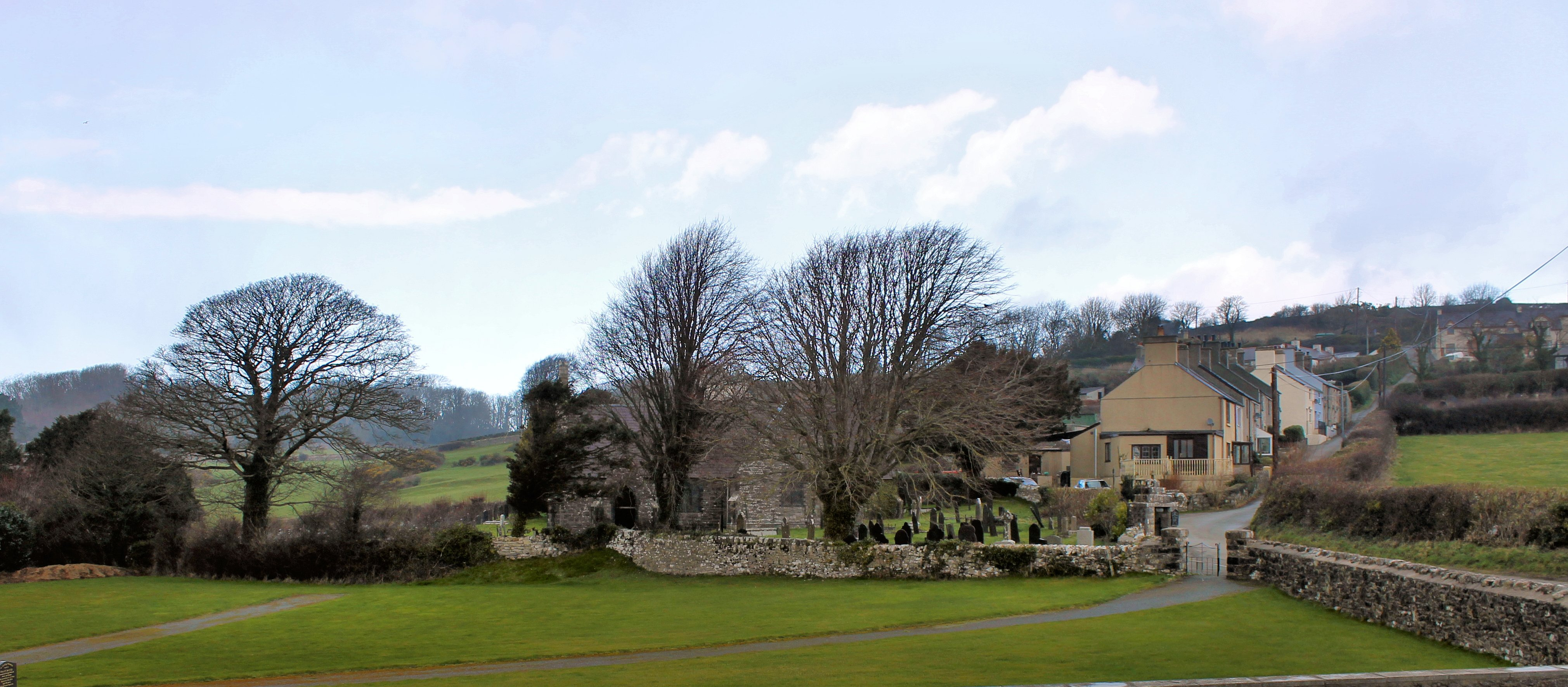
- Village and St Cawrdaf's Church

- Location within Anglesey
- Principal area: Isle of Anglesey
- Country: Wales
- Sovereign state: United Kingdom
- Police: North Wales
- Fire: North Wales
- Ambulance: Welsh
- UK Parliament: Ynys Môn
- Senedd Cymru – Welsh Parliament: Bangor Conwy Môn
- List of places UK Wales Anglesey Map of the community

Llangoed (Welsh pronunciation) is a small village, community and electoral ward just north of Beaumaris, on the Isle of Anglesey (Welsh: Ynys Môn), at grid reference SH609793. The Royal Mail postcode begins LL58. Llangoed ward has a population of 1,275 (2001), falling at the 2011 census to 1,229.

The village's placename means the 'religious enclosure in the wood' in the Welsh language.

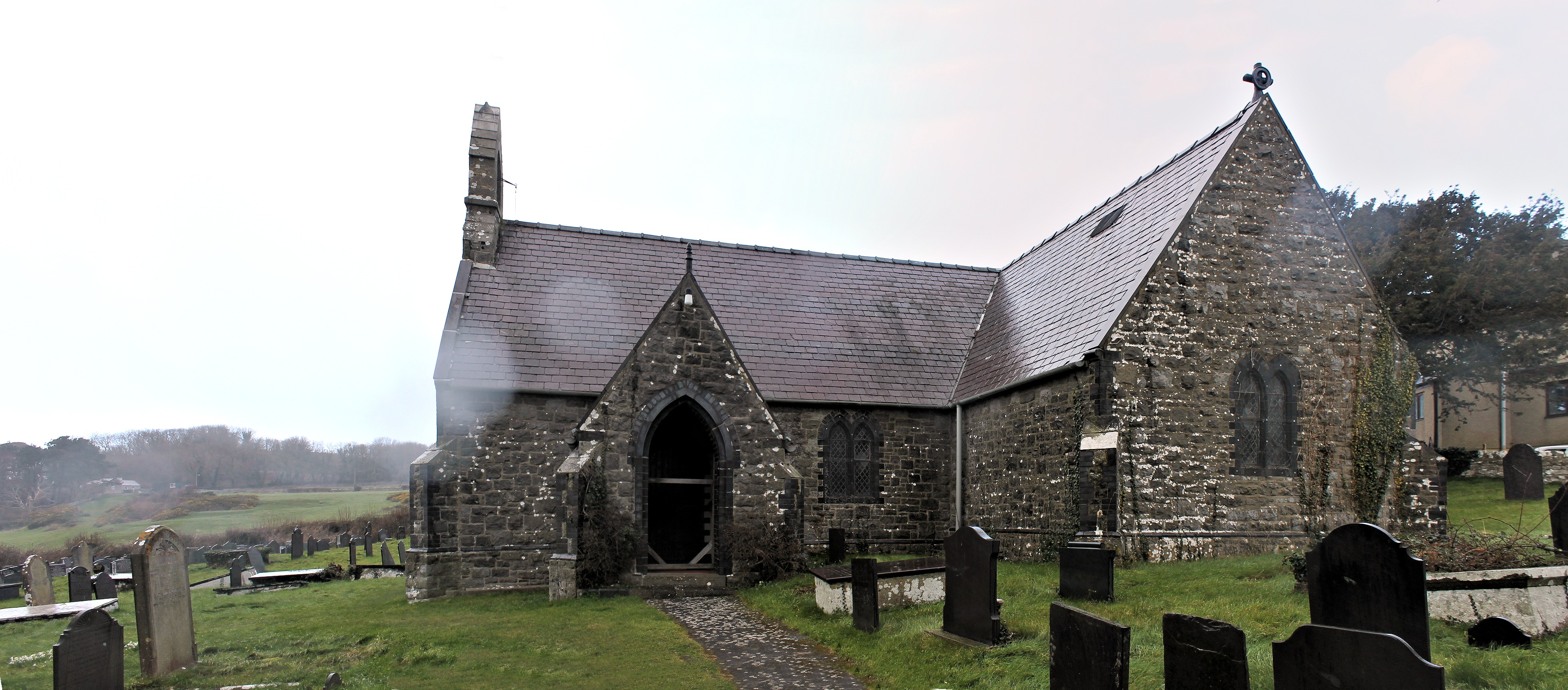
St Cawrdaf's Church

Llangoed is on the banks of a brook called the Afon Lleiniog, which flows from the hamlet of Glanrafon to the sea, beneath the ruins of an 11th-century motte-and-bailey castle, Castell Aberlleiniog.

The 17th-century parish church of St Cawrdaf, restored in the 19th century, is in the north of the village, near a Victorian school and chapel.

The modern centre of the village is a steep hill lined by cottages, a post office, grocery store and chapel. To the south of the village is a primary school, Ysgol Gynradd Llangoed, and small housing estates. Sports fields are the location of an annual Rugby sevens competition. Undulating green farmland surrounds the village, with fine views to the Menai Strait, the Irish Sea and the mountains of Snowdonia (in Welsh, Eryri).

The community also includes the villages of Glan-yr-afon, Caim, and Penmon.

== Notable people ==
- Edith Ellen Henrietta Massey (1863–1946) and Gwenddolen Elizabeth Evileen Massey (1864–1960), known as the Massey Sisters, were two Welsh artists and botanists who created a unique record of the plant life of Anglesey in the late 19th and early 20th century; they lived at Cornelyn Manor, near Llangoed.
- John L. Williams (1924–2004), a Welsh nationalist activist was born in Llangoed
