= Diocese of Bangor =

Diocese of the Church in Wales

Diocese of Bangor Esgobaeth Bangor
- Coat of arms

- Flag

Location
- Country: Wales
- Ecclesiastical province: Wales
- Archdeaconries: Bangor; Meirionnydd; Anglesey

Information
- Denomination: Church in Wales
- Cathedral: Cathedral Church of Saint Deiniol

Current leadership
- Bishop: Manon Ceridwen James (since 2026)
- Dean: vacant

Map
- Map of the diocese in the Church in Wales

Website
- bangor.churchinwales.org.uk

The Diocese of Bangor is a diocese of the Church in Wales in North West Wales. The diocese covers Anglesey, most of Caernarfonshire and Merionethshire and the western part of Montgomeryshire.

== History ==
Diocese of Bangor Act 1685
- Act of Parliament
- Parliament of England
- Long title: An Act for the Repair of the Cathedral Church of Bangor, and for the Maintenance of the Choir there, and for the Augmentation of the Revenue of the Bishopric of Bangor; and also for an Augmentation of several Vicarages within the Comportion of Landinum, in the Diocese of Bangor aforesaid.
- Citation: 1 Ja. 2. c. 11 Pr.
- Territorial extent: England and Wales

Dates
- Royal assent: 2 July 1685
- Commencement: 19 May 1685 (Note: Start of session.)

Status: Current legislation

The diocese in the Welsh kingdom of Gwynedd was founded around 546 by Saint Deiniol. As with the rest of Wales, it initially resisted the papal mission of St Augustine of Canterbury in Britain. In 1534, the church in England and Wales broke allegiance with the Catholic Church and established the Church of England.

The Report of the Commissioners appointed by his Majesty to inquire into the Ecclesiastical Revenues of England and Wales (1835) found the see had an annual net income of £4,464. This made it the second wealthiest diocese in Wales, after St Asaph.

After a brief restoration with the Holy See during the reign of Queen Mary I, the diocese remained part of the Anglican Province of Canterbury until the early 20th century. Following the Welsh Church Act 1914, the Welsh dioceses formed the independent Church in Wales within the Anglican Communion on 31 March 1920.

== Bishops of Bangor ==
The Bishop of Bangor is the ordinary of the Diocese of Bangor. The incumbent is Manon Ceridwen James, who was consecrated the 82nd Bishop of Bangor in 2026. She is the first female to hold the position.

== Archdeaconries and deaneries ==
| Diocese | Archdeaconry | Deanery | Churches | Former churches | Clergy (Oct 2026) | Population | People/church | People/clergy | Churches/clergy |
|---|---|---|---|---|---|---|---|---|---|
| Diocese of Bangor | Archdeaconry of Bangor | Synod Bangor | 38 | 37 | 10 | 90,917 | 2,393 | 9,092 | 3.8 |
| Diocese of Bangor | Archdeaconry of Anglesey | Synod Ynys Mon | 59 | 42 | 16 | 70,438 | 1,194 | 4,402 | 3.69 |
| Diocese of Bangor | Archdeaconry of Meirionnydd | Synod Meirionnydd | 64 | 48 | 12 | 68,726 | 1,074 | 5,727 | 5.33 |
| Total/average | | | 161 | 127 | 38 | 230,081 | 1,429 | 6,055 | 4.24 |

Before the recent reorganisation the twelve deaneries were:

- under the Archdeacon of Bangor: Archlechwedd, Arfon, Llifon-Talybolion, Malltraeth, Ogwen, Tyndaethwy and Twrcelyn.
- under the Archdeacon of Meirionydd: Ardudwy, Arwystli, Cyfeiliog-Mawddwy, Llyn-Eifionydd and Ystumaner.

== Map of churches ==
Current churches in the Diocese as of October 2026 (red = ancient, blue = modern)

== List of churches ==
The diocese is divided into 27 ministry areas and has 162 churches. There are three deaneries where previously there were twelve. In 2018 the deaneries of Synod De Meirionnydd and Synod Gogledd Meirionnydd were merged into a single Synod Meirionnydd. There are 127 former churches within the area covered by the diocese.

Key: APC = ancient parish church. MC = medieval chapelry.

=== Synod Bangor / Archdeaconry of Bangor ===
==== Bro Beuno Sant Uwch Gwyrfai Ministry Area ====
This was formed by the union of the parishes of Clynnog Fawr, Llanaelhaearn, Llandwrog, Llanllyfni and Llanwnda. It is named after St Beuno, to whom a church in the area is dedicated, and the medieval commote of Uwch Gwyrfai. It has an estimated population of 11,436. As of October 2026 it was served by one Ministry Area Leader (Nia Williams).

| Church | Founded (building) | |
|---|---|---|
| St Beuno, Clynnog Fawr | APC | |
| St Aelhaearn, Llanaelhaearn | APC | |
| St Twrog, Llandwrog | APC (1860) | |
| St Rhedyw, Llanllyfni | APC | |
| St Gwyndaf, Llanwnda | APC (1847) | |
| Former churches | Founded (building) | Closed |
| Christ Church, Penygroes^{1} | pre-1890 (1890) | 2020s |
| St John, Talysarn | 1871 or 1887 | c. 2019 |
| St Thomas, Groeslon | 1853 | |
| St George, Trefor | 1881 | |
| Rhostryfan Mission Church | pre-1895 | C20th |

^{1}as of October 2026 regular worship was not being held in this church.

==== Bro Celynnin Ministry Area ====
This was formed in 2016 by the union of the parishes of Caerhun-with-Llangelynnin, Conwy, Gyffin and Upper Llanbedr. It is named after St Celynnin, to whom a church in the area is dedicated. It has an estimated population of 7,235. As of October 2026 it was served by one Ministry Area Leader (Kevin Ellis) and one Pioneer Priest (Eryl Parry).

| Church | Founded (building) | |
|---|---|---|
| St Mary, Caerhun | APC | |
| St Celynnin, Llangelynnin^{1} | APC | |
| St Mary & All Saints, Conwy^{2} | APC | |
| St Benedict, Gyffin | APC | |
| St Peter, Llanbedr-y-Cennin | APC | |
| Former churches | Founded (building) | Closed |
| St Celynnin's New Church, Llangelynnin | 1840 | 1980s |
| St Agnes, Conwy | 1875 | c. 1972 |

^{1}used for one service a month from April to October ^{2}original dedication to St Mary

==== Bro Deiniol Ministry Area ====
This was formed by the union of the parishes of Bangor Cathedral, Bangor Holy Cross, Bangor St David, Bangor St Mary and Bangor St Peter. It is named after St Deiniol, the first Bishop of Bangor. It has an estimated population of 18,519. As of October 2026 it was served by one Acting Dean (Tracy Jones) and one Associate Vicar (Andy Broadbent).

| Church | Founded (building) | |
|---|---|---|
| Cathedral of St Deiniol, Bangor | APC | |
| Holy Cross, Maesgeirchen | 1958 | |
| Former churches | Founded (building) | Closed |
| St Peter, Penrhosgarnedd | pre-1895 (1956) | 2020 |
| St David, Bangor | 1888 | 2014 |
| St Mary, Bangor | 1864-66 | 2014 |
| St James, Bangor | 1866 | pre-1996 |

==== Bro Dwylan Ministry Area ====
This was formed by the union of the parishes of Dwygyfylchi St David, Dwygyfylchi St Gwynin, Dwygyfylchi St Seiriol, Llanfairfechan and Penmaenmawr. It is named after ?. It has an estimated population of 8,108. As of October 2026 it was served by one Assistant Curate (Karen Morris).

| Church | Founded (building) | |
|---|---|---|
| St David, Penmaenmawr | 1893 | |
| St Gwynan, Dwygyfylchi | APC (1889) | |
| St Mary & Christ Church, Llanfairfechan^{1} | 1864 | |
| Former churches | Founded (building) | Closed |
| St Seiriol, Penmaenmawr | 1867 | 2015 |
| St Bodfan, Abergwyngregyn | APC (1878) | |
| St Mary, Llanfairfechan | APC (1849) | 1999 |

^{1}dedication was Christ Church until 1999.

==== Bro Eryri Ministry Area ====
This was formed by the union of the parishes of Llanberis St Padarn, Llanberis St Peter, Llanddeiniolen, Llandinorwig, Llanrug and Penisarwaun. It is named after Eryri, the Welsh name for Snowdonia. It has an estimated population of 10,297. As of October 2026 it was served by one Ministry Area Leader (Naomi Starkey).

| Church | Founded (building) | |
|---|---|---|
| St Padarn, Llanberis | 1884 | |
| St Peris, Old Llanberis, Nant Peris | APC | |
| St Deiniolen, Llanddeiniolen | APC (1843) | |
| Christ Church, Llandinorwig, Deiniolen | 1857 | |
| St Helen, Penisa'r Waun | 1883 | |
| Former churches | Founded (building) | Closed |
| St Mary, Dinorwig | pre-1887 | 1997 |
| St Michael, Llanrug | APC | 2019^{1} |
| St Gabriel, Cwm-y-glo | pre-1887 | pre-2014 |
| Bethel-Saron Mission Church | pre-1887 | ? |

^{1}as of October 2026 a monthly "cafe church" service was held in the village hall.

==== Bro Gwydyr Ministry Area ====
This was formed by the union of the parishes of Betws-y-Coed, Dolgarrog, Dolwyddelan, Llanrhychwyn, Penmachno and Trefriw. It is named after Gwydyr Forest. It has an estimated population of 3,107. As of September 2024 it was served by one Ministry Area Leader (Stuart Elliott).

| Church | Founded (building) | |
|---|---|---|
| St Mary, Betws-y-Coed | 1873 | |
| St Mary, Dolgarrog | 1913 (1976) | |
| St Gwyddelan, Dolwyddelan | APC (c. 1500) | |
| St Rhychwyn, Llanrhychwyn | APC | |
| St Tyddyd/Tydclud, Penmachno | APC (1857) | |
| St Mary, Trefriw | APC | |
| Former churches | Founded (building) | Closed |
| St Michael, Betws-y-Coed | APC | 2000 |
| St Curig, Capel Curig | 1883 | 1992 |
| St Julitta, Capel Curig^{1} | MC | 1970s |
| St John the Baptist, Pont Cyfyng | 1875 | pre-1953 |
| St Enclydwyn, Cwm Penmachno | 1921 | 1981 |
| St Elizabeth, Dolwyddelan | 1886 | ? |

^{1}dedicated to St Curig until 1883

==== Bro Ogwen Ministry Area ====
This was formed by the union of the parishes of Coetmor, Glanogwen, Llandygai St Ann, Llandygai St Tegai, Llanllechid, Pentir, Tal-y-bont and Tregarth. It is named after the Afon Ogwen. It has an estimated population of 9,251. As of July 2026 its clergy position was vacant and being advertised for.

| Church | Founded (building) | |
|---|---|---|
| Christ Church Glanogwen, Bethesda | 1856 | |
| SS Anne & Mary, Mynydd Llandegai^{1} | c. 1930s | |
| St Tegai, Llandygai | APC | |
| St Cedol, Pentir | MC (1848) | |
| Holy Cross, Tal-y-bont | 1892 | |
| St Mary, Tregarth | 1869 | |
| Former churches | Founded (building) | Closed |
| Coetmor Chapel, Bethesda | 1911 | c. 2020 |
| St Llechid, Llanllechid | APC (1844) | 2002 |
| St Elizabeth, Glasinfryn | 1871 | pre-2001 |
| St Daniel, Tal-y-bont | pre-1887 | 1892 |
| St Anne, Mynydd Llandegai | 1813 (1865) | 1996 |

^{1}dedicated to St Mary (as a Mission Chapel) until 2000. The building may be

==== Bro Peblig Ministry Area ====
This was formed by the union of the parishes of Bettws Garmon, Caernarfon, Llanbeblig, Llanfair-is-Gaer Griffith's Crossing and Llanfair-is-Gaer St Mary. It is named after St Peblig, to whom is dedicated the original parish church of Caernarfon. It has an estimated population of 15,717. As of October 2026 it was served by one Ministry Area Leader (Dylan Williams).

| Church | Founded (building) | |
|---|---|---|
| St Garmon, Betws Garmon | APC (1842) | |
| St Mary, Caernarfon | MC | |
| St Peblig, Llanbeblig, Caernarfon | APC | |
| St Mary, Llanfair-is-Gaer | APC | |
| Former churches | Founded (building) | Closed |
| Christ Church, Caernarfon | 1864 | 1982 |
| St David, Caernarfon | 1873 | 1985 |
| St Baglan's Old Church, Llanfaglan | APC | 1970s |
| St Baglan's New Church, Llanfaglan | 1871 | c. 2017 |
| St John the Evangelist, Waunfawr | 1880 | pre-2001 |
| St Mary, Y Felinheli | 1865 | 2015 |
| Port Church, Port Dinorwic | 1863 | 1950 |

==== Bro Tudno Ministry Area ====
This was formed by the union of the parishes of Llandudno Holy Trinity and Llandudno St Tudno. It is named after St Tudno, to whom is dedicated the original parish church of Llandudno. It has an estimated population of 7,247. As of October 2026 it was served by one Ministry Area Leader (Vince Morris).

| Church | Founded (building) | |
|---|---|---|
| Holy Trinity, Llandudno | 1874 | |
| St Tudno, Llandudno | APC | |
| Former churches | Founded (building) | Closed |
| St George, Llandudno | 1840-1841 | 2002 |

=== Synod Meirionnydd / Archdeaconry of Meirionnydd ===
==== Bro Ardudwy Ministry Area ====
This was formed in February 2016 by the union of the parishes of Caerdeon, Dyffryn, Harlech, Llanaber St David, Llanaber St John, Llanaber St Mary, Llanbedr, Llandanwg, Llanddwywe, Llandecwyn, Llanenddwyn, Llanfair-Juxta-Harlech and Llanfihangel-Y-Traethau. It is named after the historical area of Ardudwy. It has an estimated population of 6,925. As of October 2026 it was served by one Ministry Area Leader (Ben Griffith).

| Church | Founded (building) | |
|---|---|---|
| St Tanwg, Harlech | 1841 | |
| St John the Evangelist, Barmouth | 1889-95 | |
| SS Mary & Bodfan, Llanaber^{1} | APC (medieval) | |
| St Peter, Llanbedr | MC to Llandanwg (medieval) | |
| St Tanwg, Llandanwg | APC (medieval) | |
| St Dwywe, Llanddwywe(-is-y-graig) | APC (medieval) | |
| St Tecwyn, Llandecwyn | APC (1879) | |
| St Mary, Llanfair | APC (medieval) | |
| St Michael, Llanfihangel-y-traethau | APC (1871) | |
| Former churches | Founded (building) | Closed |
| St Philip, Caerdeon | 1862 | 2014 |
| Christ Church, Talsarnau | 1871 | 2014 |
| St David, Barmouth | 1830 | c. 2018 |
| St Enddwyn, Llanenddwyn | APC (medieval) | 2017 |

^{1}original dedication to St Bodfan

==== Bro Arwystli Ministry Area ====
This was formed by the union of the parishes of Carno, Llandinam, Llangurig, Llanidloes, Llanwnnog, Penstrowed and Trefeglwys. It is named after the historical area of Arwystli. It has an estimated population of 8,428. As of October 2026 it was served by one Ministry Area Leader (Alison Gwalchmai) and one Pioneer Priest and Associate Vicar (Jon Price).

| Church | Founded (building) | |
|---|---|---|
| St John the Baptist, Carno | APC (1867) | |
| St Llonio, Llandinam | APC (1865) | |
| St Curig, Llangurig | APC | |
| St Idloes, Llanidloes | APC | |
| St Gwynog, Llanwnog | APC | |
| St Gwrhai, Penstrowed | APC (1864) | |
| St Michael, Trefeglwys | APC (1865) | |
| Former churches | Founded (building) | Closed |
| St Mary, Caersws | 1871 | 2010 |

==== Bro Cyfeiliog a Mawddwy Ministry Area ====
This was formed by the union of the parishes of Cemais, Corris, Darowen, Esgairgeiliog, Llanbrynmair, Llanwrin, Machynlleth, Mallwyd and Penegoes. It is named after the medieval commotes of Cyfeiliog and Mawddwy. It has an estimated population of 6,589. As of October 2026 it was served by one Ministry Area Leader (Miriam Beecroft) and one Associate Priest (Peter Ward).

| Church | Founded (building) | |
|---|---|---|
| St Tydecho, Cemmaes | APC | |
| Holy Trinity, Lower Corris | c. 1875 | |
| St Tudur, Darowen | APC (1862) | |
| St Mary, Llanbrynmair | APC | |
| St Gwrin, Llanwrin^{1} | APC | |
| St Peter, Machynlleth | APC (1827) | |
| St Tydecho, Mallwyd | APC | |
| Former churches | Founded (building) | Closed |
| St Cadfarch, Penegoes | APC (1884) | |
| St David, Dylife | 1856 | 1962 |
| St John, Llanbrynmair | 1867 | |
| St Tydecho, Llanymawddwy | APC | 2006 |
| Christ Church, Machynlleth | 1881 | 1965 |

^{1}original dedication to SS Ust & Dyfrig

==== Bro Cymer Ministry Area ====
This was formed by the union of the parishes of Bontddu, Bryncoedifor, Dolgellau, Llanelltud and Llanfachreth. It is named after Cymer Abbey. It has an estimated population of 4,256. As of October 2026 it was served by one Ministry Area Leader (Carol Roberts).

| Church | Founded (building) | |
|---|---|---|
| St Mary, Dolgellau | APC (1716) | |
| St Illtyd, Llanelltyd | APC | |
| St Machreth, Llanfachreth | APC (1874) | |
| Former churches | Founded (building) | Closed |
| St Paul, Bryncoedifor | 1846 | c. 2020 |
| St Mark, Brithdir | 1898 | 2003 |
| Ganllwyd Mission Room | 1850 | 1976 |
| St Bartholomew's Mission Church, Bontddu | pre-1895 | early 1970s |

==== Bro Eifionydd Ministry Area ====
This was formed by the union of the parishes of Abererch, Beddgelert, Criccieth, Dolbenmaen, Llanarmon, Llangybi, Llanystymdwy, Porthmadog St John, Porthmadog St Cyngar and Treflys. It was previously known as Bro'r Holl Saint. It is named after the historical area of Eifionydd. It has an estimated population of 10,330. As of October 2026 it was served by one Ministry Area Leader (Kim Williams).

| Church | Founded (building) | |
|---|---|---|
| St Cawrdaf, Abererch | APC | |
| St Mary, Beddgelert | APC | |
| St Catherine, Criccieth | APC | |
| St Mary, Dolbenmaen | APC | |
| St Cybi, Llangybi | APC | |
| St John the Baptist, Llanystumdwy | APC (1862) | |
| St John, Porthmadog^{1} | 1876 | |
| St Cyngar, Borth-y-Gest | 1913 | |
| St Michael, Treflys | APC | |
| Former churches | Founded (building) | Closed |
| St Garmon, Llanarmon | APC | c. 2023 |
| St Deiniol, Criccieth | 1887 | 1988 |
| St David, Garndolbenmaen | 1900 | |
| St Michael, Llanfihangel-y-Pennant | APC | |
| St Beuno, Penmorfa | APC | 1999 |
| St Mary, Tremadog | 1811 | 1995 |
| St Cynhaearn, Ynyscynhaearn | APC (1832) | pre-2003 |
| St John, Prenteg | pre-1887 | C20th |

^{1}Victorian church closed 2023. Congregation continues to meet in a remodelled dentist's surgery, opened 19th February 2023.

==== Bro Enlli Ministry Area ====
This was formed by the union of the parishes of Aberdaron, Denio, Llanbedrog, Llanengan, Llanfaelrhys, Llangian, Llannor and Pwllheli. It is named after Ynys Enlli (Bardsey Island). It has an estimated population of 10,322. As of October 2026 it was served by one Ministry Area Leader (Rhun ap Robert).

| Church | Founded (building) | |
|---|---|---|
| St Hywyn, Aberdaron | APC | |
| St Pedrog, Llanbedrog | APC | |
| St Engan, Llanengan | APC | |
| St Maelrhys, Llanfaelrhys | APC | |
| St Cian, Llangian | APC | |
| Holy Cross, Llannor | APC | |
| St Peter, Pwllheli | 1832 (1887) | |
| Former churches | Founded (building) | Closed |
| St Aelrhiw, Y Rhiw | APC (1860) | |
| St Hywyl's New Church, Aberdaron | 1841 | 1940s |
| St John's Mission Church, Abersoch | 1911 | post-1984 |
| St Merin, Bodferin | APC | post-C16th |
| St Cynfil, Penrhos | APC (1842) | |
| St Beuno, Denio, Pwllheli | APC | 1859 |
| St Michael, Llanfihangel Bachellaeth | APC | |
| St Buan, Boduan | APC (1765) (1894) | 1991 |

==== Bro Madryn Ministry Area ====
This was formed by the union of the parishes of Botwnnog, Bryncroes, Edern, Llandudwen, Llangwnnadl, Llaniestyn, Nefyn, Penllech, Pistyll and Tudweiliog. It is named after Saint Madryn. It has an estimated population of 5,393. As of May 2026 its clergy position was vacant and being advertised for.

| Church | Founded (building) | |
|---|---|---|
| St Mary, Bryncroes | APC (C16th) | |
| St Edern, Edern | APC (C15th) | |
| St Tudwen, Llandudwen | APC | |
| St Gwynhoedl, Llangwnadl | APC (C14th/15th) | |
| St Iestyn, Llaniestyn | APC | |
| St David, Nefyn | 1904 | |
| St Beuno, Pistyll^{3} | APC | |
| St Mary, Morfa Nefyn^{1} | 1870 | |
| Former churches | Founded (building) | Closed |
| St Beuno, Botwnnog | APC | 2016^{2} |
| St Mary, Penllech | APC | pre-2009 |
| St Cwyfan, Tudweiliog | APC (1849) | c. 2023 |
| St Cuwch, Carnguwch | APC | 1890s |
| St Ceidio, Ceidio | APC | |
| St Gwynnin, Llandegwning | APC (1840) | 1960s |
| St James, Llithfaen | 1882 | |
| St Peter ad Vincula, Meyllteyrn | APC (1846) | 1990s |
| St Mary, Nefyn | APC (1827) | 1977 |

^{1}closed 2013 but reopened 2024 ^{2}a small group continues to meet in Abersoch in a rented Baptist chapel as "Eglwys y Bont" ^{3}used for one service a month between Easter and September

==== Bro Moelwyn Ministry Area ====
This was formed by the union of the parishes of Blaenau Ffestiniog, Ffestiniog, Maentwrog, Penrhyndeudraeth and Trawsfynydd. It is named after the Moelwyn mountains. It has an estimated population of 9,057. As of October 2026 it was served by one Ministry Area Leader (Roland Barnes).

| Church | Founded (building) | |
|---|---|---|
| St David, Blaenau Ffestiniog | 1842 | |
| St Michael, Llan Ffestiniog | APC (1843) | |
| SS Twrog & Mary, Maentwrog | APC (1896) | |
| Holy Trinity, Penrhyndeudraeth | 1858 | |
| St Madryn, Trawsfynydd | APC | |
| Former churches | Founded (building) | Closed |
| St Martha, Manod | 1871 (c. 1880) | pre-1997 |
| St Catherine, Garreg | pre-1887 | |
| St Brothen, Llanfrothen | APC | pre-2002 |
| Tanygrisiau Chapel of Ease | pre-1887 | 1950s |
| St Thomas, Bronaber | pre-1887 | 1950s |

==== Bro Ystumanner Ministry Area ====
This was formed by the union of the parishes of Aberdyfi, Abergynolwyn, Arthog, Fairbourne, Llanegryn, Llanfihangel-Y-Pennant, Llangelynnin, Llwyngwril, Tal-Y-Llyn and Tywyn. It is named after the historic commote of Ystumanner. It has an estimated population of 7,426. As of October 2026 it was served by one Ministry Area Leader (Ruth Hansford) and two Associate Vicars (Steve Rollins and George Williams).

| Church | Founded (building) | |
|---|---|---|
| St Peter, Aberdyfi | 1837 | |
| St David, Abergynolwyn | 1880 | |
| St Catherine, Arthog | c. 1808 | |
| St Cynon, Fairbourne | 1927 | |
| SS Mary & Egryn, Llanegryn^{1} | APC | |
| St Michael, Llanfihangel-y-Pennant | APC | |
| St Celynnin, Llwyngwril | 1843 | |
| St Cadfan, Tywyn | APC | |
| St Peter ad Vincula, Pennal | APC (C18th) | |
| Former churches | Founded (building) | Closed |
| St Celynnin Old Church, Llangelynnin | APC | c. 2015 |
| St Mary, Tal-y-llyn | APC | |
| St Matthew, Bryncrug | 1882 | |
| St Mary, Rhoslefain | 1870 | |

^{1}original dedication to St Egryn

=== Synod Ynys Môn ===
==== Bro Cadwaladr Ministry Area ====
This was formed by the union of the parishes of Aberffraw, Gaerwen, Llanffinan, Llanfihangel Ysgeifiog, Llangadwaladr, Llangaffo, Llangristiolus, Trefdraeth Christ the King and Trefdraeth St Beuno. It is named after Saint Cadwaladr, to whom one of the churches is dedicated. It has an estimated population of 5,651. As of October 2026 it was served by one Ministry Area Leader (E. C. Williams) and one Associate Priest (Elizabeth Roberts).

| Church | Founded (building) | |
|---|---|---|
| St Beuno, Aberffraw | APC | |
| St Cadwaladr, Llangadwaladr | APC | |
| Christ the King, Malltraeth^{1} | pre-1887 | |
| St Beuno, Trefdraeth | APC | |
| St Ffinan, Llanffinan | APC (1841) | |
| St Michael, Gaerwen | 1847 | |
| St Cristiolus, Llangristiolus | APC | |
| St Caffo, Llangaffo | APC (1846) | |
| Former churches | Founded (building) | Closed |
| St Ceinwen, Cerrigceinwen | APC (1869) | |
| St Michael, Llanfihangel Ysgeifiog | APC | 1847 |
| St Mary, Tal-y-llyn | MC | 1992 |
| St Deiniol, Llanddaniel Fab | APC (1873) | c. 2000 |

^{1}dedicated to St Elizabeth in 1913; rededicated to Christ the King in 1959.

==== Bro Cwyfan Ministry Area ====
This was formed by the union of the parishes of Bodedern, Bryngwran, Caergeiliog, Llanbabo, Llanfachraeth, Llanfaelog, Llanfair-Yn-Neubwll, Llanfihangel-Yn-Nhywyn, Llangwyfan, Llantrisant, Llanynghenedl, Llechylched and Valley. It is named after Saint Kevin of Glendalough, to whom a redundant church in the area is dedicated. It has an estimated population of 9,490. As of October 2026 it was served by one Ministry Area Leader (Matthew Webster).

| Church | Founded (building) | |
|---|---|---|
| St Mary, Llangwyfan^{2} | 1870 | |
| St Edern, Bodedern | APC | |
| Holy Trinity, Bryngwran | 1842 | |
| St Machraeth, Llanfachraeth | APC (1878) | |
| St Maelog, Llanfaelog | APC (1848) | |
| St Pabo, Llanbabo^{2} | APC | |
| St Michael, Valley | 1887 | |
| St Cwyfan, Llangwyfan^{1} | APC | |
| SS Afran, Ieuan & Sannan, Llantrisant^{3} | 1899 | |
| Former churches | Founded (building) | Closed |
| Holy Rood, Ceirchiog | APC | c. C16th |
| St David, Caergeiliog | 1912 | pre-2013 |
| St Peulan, Llanbeulan | APC | pre-2004 |
| SS Marcellus & Marcellina, Llanddeusant | APC (1868) | 1994 |
| St Mary, Llanfair-yn-Neubwll | APC | 1970s |
| St Figael, Llanfigael | APC | pre-2007 |
| St Llibio, Llanllibio | MC | C17th |
| SS Afran, Ieuan & Sannan (old), Llantrisant | APC | 1899 |
| St Enghenedl, Llanynghenedl | APC (1862) | C20th |
| St Cynfarwy, Llechgynfarwy | APC (1867) | post-2010 |
| St Ylched, Llechylched | APC | 1842 |
| St Michael, Llanfihangel yn Nhowyn | APC (1862) | |
| St Mwrog, Llanfwrog | MC | |

^{1}used for three services a year in the summer, plus weddings and baptisms ^{2}used for one service a year at Harvest ^{3}used for four services a year

==== Bro Cybi Ministry Area ====
This was formed by the union of the parishes of Holyhead Morawelon, Holyhead St Cybi, Holyhead St Ffraid and Holyhead St Gwenfaen. It is named after Saint Cybi, to whom the church of Holyhead is dedicated. It has an estimated population of 14,133. As of October 2026 it was served by one Vicar (Kathryn Evans), one Associate Vicar (Neil Ridings) and one Pioneer Priest (George Bearwood).

| Church | Founded (building) | |
|---|---|---|
| St Cybi, Holyhead | APC | |
| St David, Morawelon, Holyhead | 1963 | |
| St Gwenfaen, Rhoscolyn | APC (1879) | |
| St Ffraid, Trearddur Bay | 1898 (1932) | |
| Former churches | Founded (building) | Closed |
| St Seiriol, Holyhead | 1854 | 1980s |
| St Ffraid's Chapel, Tywyn-y-Capel | MC | post-C16th |

==== Bro Cyngar Ministry Area ====
This was formed by the union of the parishes of Bodwrog, Heneglwys, Llandrygarn, Llanerch-Y-Medd, Llangefni, Llangwyllog St Cwyllog, Tregaean and Trewalchmai. It is named after Saint Cyngar, to whom the church of Llangefni is dedicated. It has an estimated population of 8,344. As of March 2026 its clergy position was vacant and being advertised for.

| Church | Founded (building) | |
|---|---|---|
| St Llwydian, Heneglwys | APC (1845) | |
| St Trygarn, Llandrygarn | APC | |
| St Cwyllog, Llangwyllog | APC | |
| St Caian, Tregaian | APC | |
| St Cyngar, Llangefni | APC (1824) | |
| St Morhaiarn, Gwalchmai | APC | |
| Former churches | Founded (building) | Closed |
| St Twrog, Bodwrog | APC (c. 1490) | |
| St Dyfnan, Llanddyfnan | APC | |
| St Deiniol, Talwrn | 1891 | 2013 |

==== Bro Dwynwen Ministry Area ====
This was formed by the union of the parishes of Llanedwen, Llanfairpwllgwyngyll, Llanfair-yn-y-Cwmwd, Llangeinwen, Llanidan and Newborough. It is named after Saint Dwynwen, to whom a redundant church in the area is dedicated. It has an estimated population of 6,573. As of September 2024 it was served by one Ministry Area Leader (Llywelyn Moules-Jones) and one Associate Vicar (Selwyn Griffith).

| Church | Founded (building) | |
|---|---|---|
| St Edwen, Llanedwen | APC (1856) | |
| St Mary, Llanfairpwllgwyngyll | APC (1853) | |
| St Nidan, Llanidan | 1843 | |
| St Ceinwen, Llangeinwen | APC | |
| St Peter, Newborough | APC | |
| Former churches | Founded (building) | Closed |
| St Mary, Llanfair-yn-y-Cwmwd | MC | 2020s^{1} |
| St Dwynwen, Llanddwyn | APC | |
| Old Church of St Nidan, Llanidan | APC | 1843 |
| St Thomas, Newborough | 1890s | C20th |
| St Gredifael, Penmynydd^{2} | APC | post-2010 |

^{1}as of October 2026 regular worship had ceased and the church was being converted into a 'pilgrimage church' ^{2}occasional services still held

==== Bro Eleth Ministry Area ====
This was formed by the union of the parishes of Amlwch, Llanallgo, Llandyfrydog, Llaneilian, Llaneugrad, Llanfihangel Tre'r Beirdd, Llangwyllog St Anau, Llanwenllwyfo and Penrhosllugwy. It is named after Saint Eleth, to whom the church at Amlwch is dedicated. It has an estimated population of 8,887. As of October 2026 it was served by one Associate Vicar (Pauline Jones).

| Church | Founded (building) | |
|---|---|---|
| St Eleth, Amlwch | APC (1800) | |
| St Eilian, Llaneilian | APC | |
| St Gwenllwyfo, Llanwenllwyfo | 1856 | |
| St Mary, Llannerch-y-medd | APC (1850) | |
| St Gallgo, Llanallgo | APC | |
| St Michael, Penrhoslligwy | APC | |
| Former churches | Founded (building) | Closed |
| St Peter, Porth Amlwch | 1872 | pre-2014 |
| St Tyfrydog, Llandyfrydog | APC | 2020 |
| St Euddog, Llaneuddog | MC | C19th |
| St Ana/Anau, Coedana | APC (1894) | 2020 |
| St Eugrad, Llaneugrad | APC | 2020 |
| St Michael, Llanfihangel-Tre'r-Beirdd | APC (1888) | 2020 |
| Old Church of St Gwenllwyfo, Llanwenllwyfo | APC | 1856 |
| Capel Lligwy | MC | C18th |
| St Ceidio, Rhodogeidio | APC (1845) | |
| St Mary, Gwredog, Rhodogeidio | MC | C19th |
| Christ Church, Rhosybol | 1875 | 1996 |

==== Bro Padrig Ministry Area ====
This was formed by the union of the parishes of Bodewryd, Cemaes, Llanbadrig, Llanfaethlu, Llanfair-Yng-Nghornwy, Llanfechell, Llanfflewin, Llanrhuddlad, Llanrhwydrus and Rhosbeirio. It is named after Saint Patrick, to whom two churches in the area are dedicated. It has an estimated population of 3,795. As of October 2026, it is served by one Ministry Area Leader (Catherine Duff).

| Church | Founded (building) | |
|---|---|---|
| St Mary, Llanfair-yng-Nghornwy | APC | |
| St Rhwydrus, Llanrhwydrus^{1} | APC | |
| St Padrig, Llanbadrig | APC | |
| St Patrick, Cemaes Bay | 1865 | |
| St Maethlu, Llanfaethlu | APC | |
| St Mechell, Llanfechell | APC | |
| St Fflewin, Llanfflewin^{1} | APC | |
| Former churches | Founded (building) | Closed |
| St Mary, Bodewryd | MC | 2020 |
| St Rhyddlad, Llanrhyddlad | APC (1858) | c. 2019 |
| St Peirio, Rhosbeirio | APC | C20th |

^{1}used for one service a month in the summer months

==== Bro Seiriol Ministry Area ====
This was formed by the union of the parishes of Beaumaris St Catherine, Beaumaris St Cawrdaf, Beaumaris SS Mary & Nicholas, Beaumaris St Michael, Beaumaris St Seiriol and Llanddona. It is named after Saint Seiriol, to whom a church in the area is dedicated. It has an estimated population of 3,615. As of October 2026 it is served by one Ministry Area Leader (Huw Butler) and one Associate Priest (Lesley Rendle).

| Church | Founded (building) | |
|---|---|---|
| SS Mary & Nicholas, Beaumaris | MC | |
| St Dona, Llanddona | APC (1873) | |
| St Michael, Llanfihangel Din Sylwy | APC (1855) | |
| St Iestyn, Llaniestyn | APC | |
| St Cawrdaf, Llangoed | APC (1881) | |
| St Seiriol, Penmon | APC | |
| Former churches | Founded (building) | Closed |
| St Catherine, Llanfaes | APC (1845) | 2020 |

==== Bro Tysilio Ministry Area ====
This was formed by the union of the parishes of Llanbedrgoch, Llandegfan, Llandysilio, Llanfair Mathafarn Eithaf, Llansadwrn, Menai Bridge and Pentraeth. It is named after Saint Tysilio, to whom the ancient church of Menai Bridge is dedicated. It has an estimated population of 9,950. As of October 2026 it was served by one Ministry Area Leader (Richard Wood), two Associate Vicars (Hugh Jones and Tania ap Sion) and one Curate (Naomi Wood).

| Church | Founded (building) |
|---|---|
| St Tegfan, Llandegfan | APC |
| St Sadwrn, Llansadwrn | APC (1881) |
| St Peter, Llanbedrgoch | APC |
| St Mary, Menai Bridge | 1858 |
| St Tysilio, Llandysilio, Menai Bridge^{1} | APC |
| St Mary, Pentraeth | APC |
| St Andrew, Benllech | 1964 |
| St Mary, Llanfair Mathafarn Eithaf | APC |
Former churches: none

^{1}used for one service a month in the summer months

== Dedications ==
=== Medieval churches (chapelries in italics) ===
- Holy Cross: Ceirchiog, Llannor
- St Aelhaiarn: Llanaelhaearn
- St Aelrhiw: Rhiw
- SS Afran, Ieuan & Sannan: Llantrisant
- St Ana: Coedana
- St Baglan: Llanfaglan
- St Benedict: Gyffin
- St Beuno: Aberffraw, Botwnnog, Clynnog Fawr, Denio, Penmorfa, Pistyll, Trefdraeth
- St Bodfan: Abergwyngregyn, Llanaber
- St Bridget: Trearddur Bay
- St Brothen: Llanfrothen
- St Buan: Boduan
- St Cadfan: Tywyn
- St Cadfarch: Penegoes
- St Cadwaladr: Llangadwaladr
- St Caffo: Llangaffo
- St Caian: Tregaian
- St Catherine: Criccieth, Llanfaes
- St Cawrdaf: Abererch, Llangoed
- St Cedol: Pentir
- St Ceidio: Ceidio, Rhodogeidio
- St Celynnin: Llangelynnin (Caernarfonshire), Llangelynnin (Merionethshire)
- St Cian: Llangian
- St Cristiolus: Llangristiolus
- St Curig: Capelcurig, Llangurig
- St Cuwch: Carnguwch
- St Cwyfan: Llangwyfan, Tudweiliog
- St Cwyllog: Llangwyllog
- St Cybi: Holyhead, Llangybi
- St Cynfarwy: Llechgynfarwy
- St Cynfil: Penrhos
- St Cyngar: Llangefni
- St Cynhaearn: Ynyscynhaearn
- St Deiniol: Bangor
- St Deiniol Fab: Llanddaniel Fab, Llanddeiniolen
- St Dona: Llanddona
- St Dwynwen: Llanddwyn
- St Dwywe: Llanddwywe
- St Dyfnan: Llanddyfnan
- St Edern: Bodedern, Edern
- St Edwen: Llanedwen
- St Egryn: Llanegryn
- St Eigrad: Llaneugrad
- St Eilian: Llaneilian
- St Elaeth: Amlwch
- St Enddwyn: Llanenddwyn
- St Engan: Llanengan
- St Enghenedl: Llanynghenedl
- St Euddog: Llaneuddog
- St Ffinan: Llanffinan
- St Fflewin: Llanfflewin
- St Figael: Llanfigael
- St Gallgo: Llanallgo
- St Germanus: Betwsgarmon, Llanarmon
- St Gredifael: Penmynydd
- St Gwenfaen: Rhoscolyn
- St Gwenllwyfo: Llanwenllwyfo
- St Gwrhai: Penstrowed
- St Gwrin: Llanwrin
- St Gwyddelan: Dolwyddelan
- St Gwyndaf: Llanwnda
- St Gwynhoedl: Llangwnadl
- St Gwynin: Dwygyfylchi, Llandegwning
- St Gwynog: Llanwnog
- St Hywyn: Aberdaron
- St Idloes: Llanidloes
- St Iestyn: Llaniestyn (Anglesey), Llaniestyn (Caernarfonshire)
- St Illtud: Llanelltyd
- St John the Baptist: Carno, Llanystumdwy
- St Keyne: Cerrigceinwen, Llangeinwen
- St Llechid: Llanllechid
- St Llibio: Llanllibio
- St Llonio: Llandinam
- St Llwydian: Heneglwys
- St Machraeth: Llanfachraeth (Anglesey), Llanfachreth (Merionethshire)
- St Madryn: Trawsfynydd
- St Maelog: Llanfaelog
- St Maelrhys: Llanfaelrhys
- St Maethlu: Llanfaethlu
- SS Marcellus & Marcellina: Llanddeusant
- St Mary: Beddgelert, Bodewryd, Bryncroes, Caerhun, Caernarfon, Conwy, Dolbenmaen, Dolgellau, Gwredog, Llanbrynmair, Llanfair, Llanfairfechan, Llanfairisgaer, Llanfairmathafarneithaf, Llanfairpwllgwyngyll, Llanfairyngnghornwy, Llanfairynneubwll, Llanfairynycwmwd, Llannerchymedd, Nefyn, Penllech, Pentraeth, Talyllyn (Anglesey), Talyllyn (Merionethshire), Trefriw
- SS Mary & Nicholas: Beaumaris
- St Mechell: Llanfechell
- St Merin: Bodferin
- St Michael: Betwsycoed, Llanffestiniog, Llanfihangelbachellaeth, Llanfihangeldinsylwy, Llanfihangeltre'rbeirdd, Llanfihangelynnhowyn, Llanfihangelypennant (Caernarfonshire), Llanfihangelypennant (Merionethshire), Llanfihangelysgeifiog, Llanfihangelytraethau, Llanrug, Penrhoslligwy, Trefeglwys, Treflys
- St Morhaiarn: Gwalchmai
- St Mwrog: Llanfwrog
- St Nidan: Llanidan
- St Pabo: Llanbabo
- St Patrick: Llanbadrig
- St Peblig: Llanbeblig
- St Peirio: Rhosbeirio
- St Peris: Llanberis
- St Peter: Llanbedr, Llanbedrgoch, Llanbedrycennin, Machynlleth, Meyllteyrn, Newborough, Pennal
- St Petroc: Llanbedrog
- St Peulan: Llanbeulan
- St Rhedyw: Llanllyfni
- St Rhwydrys: Llanrhwydrus
- St Rhychwyn: Llanrhychwyn
- St Rhyddlad: Llanrhyddlad
- St Sadwrn: Llansadwrn
- St Seiriol: Penmon
- St Tanwg: Llandanwg
- St Tecwyn: Llandecwyn
- St Tegai: Llandygai
- St Tegfan: Llandegfan
- St Trygarn: Llandrygarn
- St Tudglyd: Penmachno
- St Tudno: Llandudno
- St Tudur: Darowen
- St Tudwen: Llandudwen
- St Twrog: Bodwrog, Llandwrog, Maentwrog
- St Tydecho: Cemmaes, Llanymawddwy, Mallwyd
- St Tyfrydog: Llandyfrydog
- St Tysilio: Llandysilio
- SS Ust & Dyfrig: Llanwrin
- St Ylched: Llechylched
- No dedication/dedication unknown: Capel Lligwy

=== Post-medieval churches ===
- Christ Church: Caernarfon (1864), Glanogwen (1856), Llandinorwig (1857), Llanfairfechan (1864), Machynlleth (1881), Penygroes (C19th), Rhosybol (1875), Talsarnau (1871)
- Christ the King: Malltraeth (1959)
- Holy Cross: Maesgeirchen (1958), Talybont (1892)
- Holy Trinity: Bryngwran (1842), Corris (1875), Llandudno (1874), Penrhyndeudraeth (1858)
- SS Afran, Ieuan & Sannan: Llantrisant new (1899)
- St Agnes: Conwy (1875)
- St Andrew: Benllech (1964)
- St Anne: Tanybwlch (1813)
- St Baglan: Llanfaglan new (1871)
- St Bartholomew: Bontddu (1895)
- St Bridget: Trearddur Bay (1898)
- St Catherine: Arthog (1808), Garreg (C19th)
- St Celynnin: Llangelynnin new (1840), Llwyngwril (1843)
- St Curig: Capelcurig (1883)
- St Cyngar: Borthygest (1913)
- St Cynon: Fairbourne (1927)
- St David: Abergynolwyn (1880), Bangor (1888), Barmouth (1830), Blaenauffestiniog (1842), Caergeiliog (1912), Caernarfon (1874), Dylife (1856), Garndolbenmaen (1900), Holyhead (1963), Nefyn (1904), Penmaenmawr (1893)
- St Deiniol: Criccieth (1887), Talwrn (1891), Talybont (C19th)
- St Elizabeth: Dolwyddelan (1886), Glasinfryn (1871), Malltraeth (1913)
- St Enclydwyn: Cwmpenmachno (1921)
- St Gabriel: Cwmyglo (C19th)
- St George: Llandudno (1841), Trefor (1881)
- St Gwenllwyfo: Llanwenllwyfo new (1856)
- St Helen: Penisa'r Waun (1883)
- St Hywyn: Aberdaron new (1841)
- St James: Bangor (1866), Llithfaen (C19th)
- St John the Baptist: Pontcyfyng (1875)
- St John the Evangelist: Abersoch (1911), Barmouth (1895), Llanbrynmair (1867), Porthmadog (1876), Prenteg (C19th), Talysarn (C19th), Waunfawr (1880)
- St Julitta: Capelcurig (1883)
- St Mark: Brithdir (1898)
- St Martha: Manod (1871)
- St Mary: Bangor (1864), Betwsycoed (1873), Caersws (1871), Dinorwig (C19th), Dolgarrog (1913), Felinheli (1865), Llangwyfan (1870), Menaibridge (1858), Morfanefyn (1870), Mynyddllandygai (1930s), Rhoslefain (1870), Tregarth (1869), Tremadog (1811)
- St Matthew: Bryncrug (1882)
- St Michael: Gaerwen (1847), Valley (1887)
- St Nidan: Llanidan new (1843)
- St Padarn: Llanberis (1884)
- St Patrick: Cemaes Bay (1865)
- St Paul: Bryncoedifor (1846)
- St Peter: Aberdyfi (1837), Amlwch (1872), Penrhosgarnedd (C19th), Pwllheli (1832)
- St Philip: Caerdeon (1862)
- St Seiriol: Holyhead (1854), Penmaenmawr (1867)
- St Tanwg: Harlech (1841)
- St Thomas: Bronaber (C19th), Groeslon (1853), Newborough (C19th)
- No dedication/dedication unknown: Bethel (C19th), Coetmor Chapel (1911), Ganllwyd (1850), Port Dinorwic (1863), Rhostryfan (C19th), Tanygrisiau (C19th)

== Parishes in 1895 ==
From Slater's Directory of North and Mid Wales.

=== Archdeaconry of Bangor and Anglesey ===
- Deanery of Arfon: Bangor, Bettws-Garmon, Clynnog-Fawr, Llanaelhaearn, Llanbeblig, Llanberis, Llanddeiniolen, Llandinorwig, Llandwrog, Llanfaglan, Llanfair-is-gaer, Llanllyfni, Llanrug, Llanwnda, Pentir, Waenfawr
- Deanery of Arllechwydd: Abergwyngregyn, Bettws-y-Coed, Caerhun, Capel-Curig, Conwy, Dolgarrog, Dolwyddelan, Dwygyfylchi, Gyffin, Llanbedr-y-Cennin, Llandegai, Llandudno, Llanfair-fechan, Llangelynin, Llanllechid, Llanrhychwyn, Penmachno, St Ann's, Trefriw
- Deanery of Llifon: Bodedern, Bodwrog, Ceirchiog, Llanbeulan, Llandrygarn, Llanfaelog, Llanllibio, Llantrisaint, Llechcynfarwydd, Llechylched
- Deanery of Malltraeth: Aberffraw, Cerrigceinwen, Heneglwys, Llangadwaladr, Llangefni, Llangristiolus, Llangwyfan, Trefdraeth, Tregaian, Trewalchmai
- Deanery of Menai: Llanddaniel-Fab, Llanddwyn, Llanedwen, Llanfair-yn-y-cwmwd, Llanffinan, Llanfihangel-Ysceifiog, Llangaffo, Llangeinwen, Llanidan, Newborough
- Deanery of Talybolion: Holyhead, Llanbabo, Llanbadrig, Llanddeusant, Llanfachreth, Llanfaethlu, Llanfair-yn-neubwll, Llanfair-yng-nghornwy, Llanfechell, Llanfflewyn, Llanfigael, Llanfihangel-yn-nhowyn, Llanfwrog, Llanrhwydrys, Llanrhyddlad, Llanynghenedl, Rhoscolyn
- Deanery of Twrcelyn: Amlwch, Bodewryd, Coedana, Gwredog, Llanallgo, Llandyfrydog, Llaneilian, Llaneugrad, Llanfihangel-Tre'r-Beirdd, Llangwyllog, Llannerch-y-medd, Llanwenllwyfo, Penrhoslligwy, Rhodogeidio, Rhosbeirio
- Deanery of Tyndaethwy: Beaumaris, Llanbedrgoch, Llanddona, Llanddyfnan, Llandegfan, Llandysilio, Llanfaes, Llanfair-mathafarn-eithaf, Llanfair-pwllgwyngyll, Llanfihangel-Tyn-Sylwy, Llangoed, Llaniestyn, Llansadwrn, Penmon, Penmynydd, Pentraeth

=== Archdeaconry of Merioneth ===
- Deanery of Ardudwy: Caerdeon, Ffestiniog, Llanaber, Llanbedr, Llandanwg, Llanddwywe, Llandecwyn, Llaneltydd, Llanenddwyn, Llanfair-juxta-Harlech, Llanfihangel-y-traethau, Llanfrothen, Maentwrog, Penrhyndeudraeth, Trawsfynydd
- Deanery of Arwystli: Carno, Llandinam, Llangurig, Llanidloes, Llanwnog, Penstrowed, Trefeglwys
- Deanery of Cyfeiliog a Mawddwy: Cemmaes, Darowen, Dylife, Llanbrynmair, Llanwrin, Llanymawddwy, Machynlleth, Mallwyd, Penegoes
- Deanery of Eifionydd: Beddgelert, Criccieth, Dolbenmaen, Llanarmon, Llanfihangel-y-Pennant, Llangybi, Llanystumdwy, Penmorfa, Treflys, Ynyscynhaiarn
- Deanery of Lleyn: Aberdaron, Abererch, Bardsey Island, Bodfean, Bodferin, Bottwnog, Bryncroes, Carnguwch, Ceidio, Denio, Edern, Llanbedrog, Llandegwning, Llandudwen, Llanengan, Llanfaelrhys, Llanfihangel-Bachellaeth, Llangian, Llangwnadle, Llaniestyn, Llannor, Meyllteyrn, Nevin, Penllech, Penrhos, Pistyll, Rhiw, Tydweiliog
- Deanery of Ystumanner: Aberdovey, Corris, Dolgellau, Llanegryn, Llanfachreth, Llanfihangel-y-pennant, Llangelynin, Pennal, Talyllyn, Towyn
