= St Mary's Church, Llanfair-yn-y-Cwmwd =

Coordinates: 53.175220°N 4.325155°W

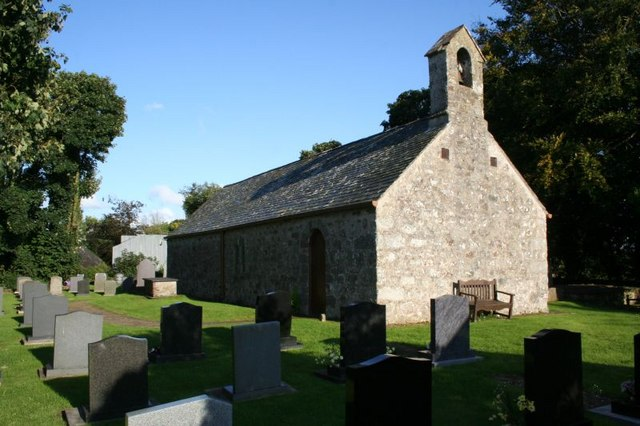
- The west end of the church

- Location in Anglesey
- Location: near Dwyran, Anglesey
- Country: Wales
- Denomination: Church in Wales
- Website: Parish website

History
- Status: Parish church
- Founded: Probably 15th century
- Dedication: St Mary

Architecture
- Functional status: Active
- Heritage designation: Grade II*
- Designated: 30 January 1968
- Architect(s): Harold Hughes and William G. Williams (1936 repairs)
- Architectural type: Church
- Style: Medieval

Specifications
- Length: 47 ft (14.3 m)
- Width: 14 ft (4.3 m)
- Materials: Rubble masonry

Administration
- Province: Province of Wales
- Diocese: Diocese of Bangor
- Archdeaconry: Bangor
- Deanery: Tindaethwy and Menai
- Parish: Newborough with Llanidan with Llangeinwen and Llanfair-yn-y-Cymwd

St Mary's Church, Llanfair-yn-y-Cwmwd is a small medieval parish church near the village of Dwyran, in Anglesey, north Wales. The building probably dates from the 15th century, with some alterations. It contains a 12th-century carved stone font and a 13th-century decorated coffin lid. The bell is inscribed with the year of its casting, 1582. The historian Henry Rowlands was vicar of St Mary's in the late 17th and early 18th centuries. Maurice Wilks, who invented the Land Rover, is buried in the churchyard.

Although at one time during the 19th century St Mary's was too dilapidated to permit services to be held, repairs were carried out in the 19th century. The church is used for worship by the Church in Wales, one of five in a combined parish. Services are held once per month between April and September. St Mary's is a Grade II* listed building, a national designation given to "particularly important buildings of more than special interest", in particular because it is regarded as "a good example of a simple, substantially unaltered, late Medieval church". It is also said to be "an important survival" because many of the older churches in Anglesey were extensively rebuilt or repaired during the 19th century, and the alterations at St Mary's were less extensive.

== History and location ==
St Mary's Church is located in a churchyard about 100 yards (90 m) from the road in the countryside near the village of Dwyran, in Anglesey, north Wales. The church is about 5.5 miles (9 km) from the county town of Llangefni, and just under 1 mile (1.5 km) from the neighbouring church of St Ceinwen's, Llangeinwen. Llanfair-yn-y-Cwmwd takes its name in part from the church: the Welsh word llan originally meant "enclosure" and then "church", and "-fair" is a modified form of the patron saint's name (Mair being the Welsh for "Mary", here referring to St Mary, the mother of Jesus). Cwmwd means "commote" (a type of Welsh land division), so the full name of the parish means "St Mary's Church in the commote".

The date of construction of the church is uncertain, but it is a medieval building, probably from the 15th century. The 19th-century clergyman and antiquarian Harry Longueville Jones thought that the church was probably 16th-century in date, but might have been built using material from an older structure. The historian Antony Carr has suggested that Llanfair-yn-y-Cwmwd was the church dedicated to St Mary that was sacked by Normans in 1157. St Mary's was formerly one of the chapels of ease to St Nidan's, Llanidan, along with St Deiniol's, Llanddaniel Fab and St Edwen's, Llanedwen. St Nidan's and its chapels were owned by the Augustinian priory at Beddgelert, Gwynedd; the date of transfer is uncertain, since not all the records have survived, but St Nidan's is mentioned as belonging to the priory in a charter of 1360. Carr has written that "we shall never know" how the "distant community" in Beddgelert came to possess the four Anglesey churches, but thought that it might be significant that the priory also controlled two churches on the mainland, on the other side of the Menai Strait.

During the 16th century, the windows of the nave had mullions (stonework supporting the window structure) added, and the roof trusses date from later in the same century (or early in the following century). In her 1833 history of Anglesey, the antiquarian Angharad Llwyd said that the church had been "for years in a state of such dilapidation as to preclude the performance of divine service", but she noted that it was being rebuilt at that time. However, compared to other churches in Anglesey, the 19th-century changes were not substantial. Repairs were undertaken in 1936 under the supervision of the architects Harold Hughes and William G. Williams.

St Mary's is used for worship by the Church in Wales. It is one of five churches in the combined benefice (parishes combined under one priest) of Newborough with Llanidan with Llangeinwen and Llanfair-yn-y-Cymwd. St Mary's is within the deanery of Tindaethwy and Menai, the archdeaconry of Bangor and the Diocese of Bangor. As of 2012, the priest in charge of the group of parishes is E. Roberts.

People associated with the church include Henry Rowlands, a clergyman and antiquarian. He was the incumbent priest of St Nidan's and its chapels of ease from 1696 until his death in 1723, and wrote a history of Anglesey, Mona Antiqua Restaurata. Maurice Wilks, who invented the Land Rover, is buried in the churchyard. He had a farm nearby in Newborough and some prototype testing of the Land Rover was carried out in Anglesey.

== Architecture and fittings ==
The church is built from rubble masonry, dressed with sandstone, and measures 47 by 14 feet (14.3 by 4.3 m). The entrance is at the west end of the north wall. The roof, which is made from slate, has a bellcote with one bell at the west end. The inscription on the bell states that it was cast in 1582, and the bell is also marked with a fleur-de-lys and the thrice-repeated initials "AMN".

Inside, although there is no structural division between the nave and the chancel, there is a 19th-century wooden screen with wrought-iron gates between them, and a step up into the chancel. The sanctuary is marked with a further step, as is the base of the altar; both steps are decorated with encaustic tiles. The internal woodwork of the roof, which has seven bays (or sections), is exposed.

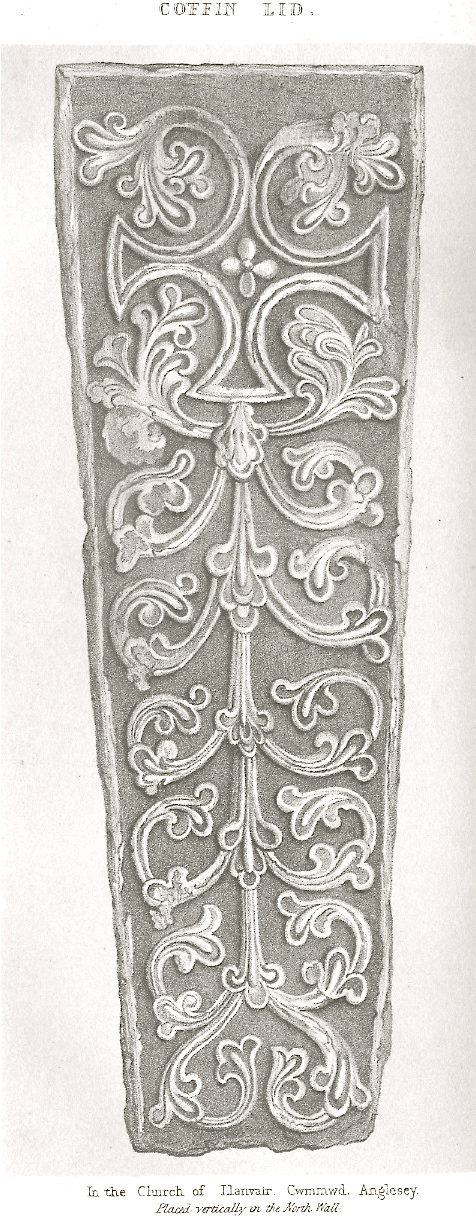
Coffin lid on N wall of chancel. Drawn by Harry Longueville Jones, Archaeologia Cambrensis, 1846 pg 394

The window in the centre north wall has two lights (sections of window separated by a mullion); there are two pairs of two-light windows in the south wall. The window at the east end had a pair of lights, topped by trefoils (a stonework pattern of three overlapping circles).

The roughly oval gritsone font at the west end of the nave, which is from the 12th century, has a zig-zag pattern, and three sides decorated with a cross. The base of the font, which is rectangular with rounded corners, has misshapen carved human heads at the corners and in the middle of one side, and a snake on two of the sides. A P-shaped sign on the east side of the font may have been added later. St Mary's has a coffin lid dating from the middle of the 13th century, displayed upside down on the north wall of the chancel. It is decorated with a carved cross and a foliage design. One 19th-century visitor noted another three old plain coffin lids on the church floor, with another in the churchyard near the east window. As well as an 18th-century slate plaque on the south wall of the nave, there are also various memorials from the 19th and 20th centuries.

== Assessment ==
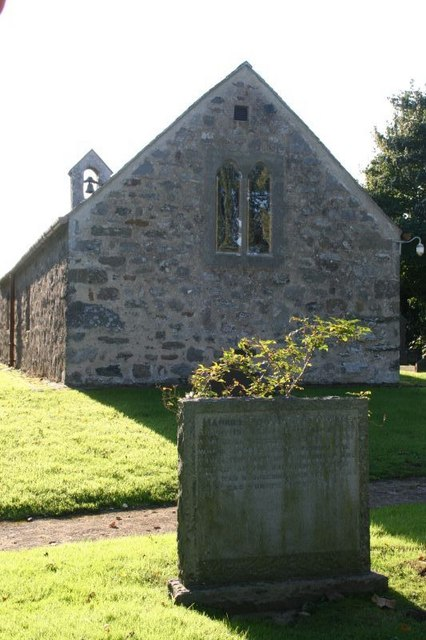
The gravestone of Maurice Wilks at the east end of the church

The church has national recognition and statutory protection from alteration as it has been designated as a Grade II* listed building – the second-highest of the three grades of listing, designating "particularly important buildings of more than special interest". It was given this status on 30 January 1968, and has been listed because it is regarded as "a good example of a simple, substantially unaltered, late Medieval church." Cadw (the Welsh Government body responsible for the built heritage of Wales and the inclusion of Welsh buildings on the statutory lists) also notes that many old churches in Anglesey were rebuilt or restored during the 19th century, and that St Mary's "can be considered an important survival."

Writing in 1846, Harry Longueville Jones said that St Mary's was "one of the smallest buildings of its class in the island" and had "no feature of any architectural value." He noted the "elaborate" coffin lid, and said that the font (a "rude production of the twelfth century") was "one of the most remarkable in the collection of Anglesey monuments". The historian and clergyman Edmund Tyrrell Green, writing a survey of Anglesey church architecture and contents in 1929, referred to the coffin lid as one of the county's "outstanding examples" of sepulchral memorials.

A 2006 guide to the churches of Anglesey describes St Mary's as "a good example of a small unspoilt country church." It notes the "simple" rood screen and the "well-maintained" churchyard. A 2009 guide to the buildings of the region refers to the church as a "small unicameral church of undeterminable date" and says that the font, on its "strangely carved rectangular base", is "inconsistent" with the Romanesque fonts found elsewhere in Anglesey
