= Peirio =

Welsh saint

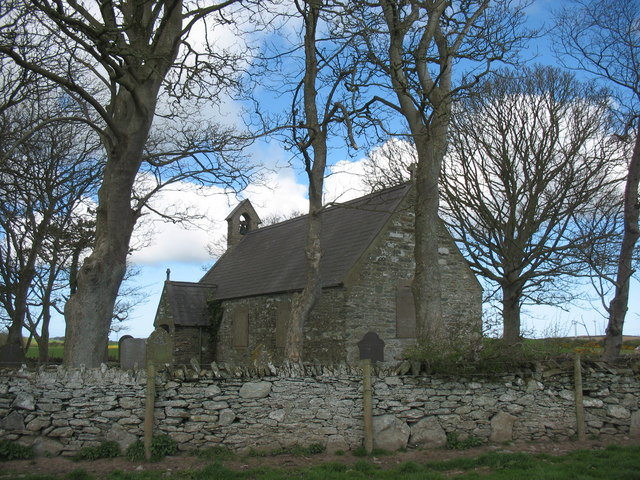
The church from the south-west, showing the porch to the left

Saint Peirio was a 6th-century pre-congregational saint of Wales and a child of King Caw of Strathclyde.

== Biography ==
In 605AD he founded a church at Rhosbeirio on Anglesey Island, North Wales. Writing in 1861, Harry Longueville Jones said of St Peirio's church that it was "one of the humblest ecclesiastical buildings in Anglesey" and that there were "no architectural features in this church worthy of delineation."
