= St Deiniol's Church, Llanddaniel Fab =

Coordinates: 53.209837°N 4.253975°W

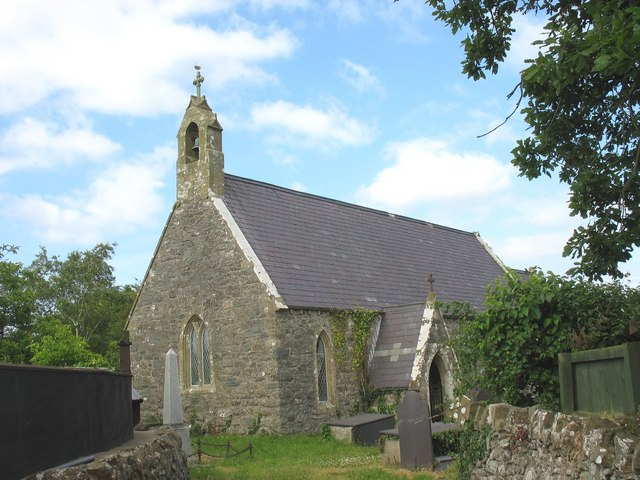
- The west end and south porch

- Location in Anglesey
- Location: Llanddaniel Fab, Anglesey
- Country: Wales
- Denomination: Church in Wales

History
- Status: Parish church
- Founded: 616; Mid-19th century (present building)
- Founder: St Deiniol Fab
- Dedication: St Deiniol Fab

Architecture
- Functional status: Closed
- Heritage designation: Grade II
- Designated: 30 January 1968
- Architect: Henry Kennedy (1873 repairs)
- Architectural type: Church
- Style: Gothic revival

Specifications
- Materials: Rubble masonry

St Deiniol's Church, Llanddaniel Fab, is a small 19th-century parish church in the centre of Llanddaniel Fab, a village in Anglesey, north Wales. The first church in this location is said to have been established by St Deiniol Fab (to whom the church is dedicated) in 616. He was the son of St Deiniol, the first Bishop of Bangor. The current building, which is in Early English style, incorporates some material and fittings from an earlier church on the site, including the font and an 18th-century memorial in the porch. The vestry door has medieval jambs and the keystone of its arch, which is also medieval, is a carved human face. Some parts of the nave walls may also come from a previous building here.

The church is no longer used for worship, and the village is now served by a church in Llanfairpwll. As of 2011, the building (without the surrounding grounds) was for sale. It is a Grade II listed building, a national designation given to "buildings of special interest, which warrant every effort being made to preserve them", in particular because it is regarded as "a good example of a simple 19th-century rural church".

== History and location ==
St Deiniol's Church is near the centre of Llanddaniel Fab, a village in the south of Anglesey, north Wales. It is reached from the street by passing through a lychgate by the local war memorial. The village takes its name from the church; the Welsh word llan originally meant "enclosure" and then "church", and -ddaniel is a modified form of the saint's name.

The date of first construction of a Christian place of worship in the area is uncertain, but it is said by 19th-century writers that a son of St Deiniol (the first Bishop of Bangor) established a church here in 616. The son, also a saint, was known as Deiniol Fab (Welsh for "Deiniol the son"), to distinguish him from his father. No part of a building from that time survives. A later edifice, dating from the 16th century or perhaps earlier, was replaced in the 19th century. Some parts of that structure may have been reused in the current church, as the 1937 survey by the Royal Commission on Ancient and Historical Monuments in Wales and Monmouthshire considered that sections of the walls of the nave may be from the older building.

In 1833, the antiquarian Angharad Llwyd described the old church as "a very ancient and dilapidated structure", which had "some good specimens of the architecture of a very remote period". Writing in 1846, the clergyman and antiquarian Harry Longueville Jones described it as one "so much altered by successive reparations, that little of its original architectural character has been preserved". Repairs were carried out to the new church, and a vestry added to the north side, in 1873. The work was overseen by Henry Kennedy, architect of the Diocese of Bangor.

St Deiniol's is no longer in use; in 2006, a guide to the churches of Anglesey noted that no services had been held for a number of years, and added that ivy was growing across the building. The church's former parish has been merged with that of the nearby village of Llanfairpwll, served by St Mary's, Llanfairpwll. As of January 2011, the church (without the grounds) was on sale for £50,000; it was suggested by the estate agents handling the sale that it could be used as a studio or for storage, subject to necessary consents being obtained.

People associated with St Deiniol's include the clergymen Henry Rowlands and Isaac Jones. Rowlands, who wrote a history of Anglesey (Mona Antiqua Restaurata) in 1723, served as priest here and in nearby parishes from 1696 onwards. Jones, a translator, was curate of St Deiniol's from 1840 until his death in 1850.

== Architecture and fittings ==
The Gothic Revival church is in the Early English style. It is built from rubble masonry dressed with limestone and has a slate roof. The vestry is partially built from material used in the old church. The door in the vestry's north wall has medieval doorjambs, and the keystone of the pointed arch, which is also medieval, is a carved human face.

The nave of the church (where the congregation sat) has no aisle. The chancel (site of the altar) is at the east end of the nave. There is a porch, which contains an 18th-century memorial, on the south side of the nave towards the west end, and a vestry to the north. Each section is steeply gabled, with the west end terminating in a bellcote surmounted by a cross and containing a single bell. The windows in the nave have two lights (sections of window separated by mullions), save for one to the west of the porch, which has one light. The east end of the chancel has three adjoining lancet windows, the tallest in the middle.

Internally, the walls have panelling at the bottom and painted plasterwork above. The roof has exposed timbers. There is a pointed chancel arch and three steps between the nave and chancel, with a further step to the sanctuary, which has a mosaic floor. The east windows and those on the north have stained glass. Fittings include the rectangular pulpit, the pews, and the altar table, which are all made of pine wood, and the octagonal font, made of granite with carvings on each side. The 1937 Royal Commission survey recorded that the church owned a plain silver cup, dated 1796–1797. A visual inspection of the church in 2006 determined that there were many cobwebs inside, but also that the pews and organ remained in place.

== Assessment ==
St Deiniol's has national recognition and statutory protection from alteration as it has been designated as a Grade II listed building – the lowest of the three grades of listing, designating "buildings of special interest, which warrant every effort being made to preserve them". It was given this status on 30 January 1968 and has been listed because it is regarded as "a good example of a simple 19th-century rural church". Cadw (the Welsh Government body responsible for the built heritage of Wales and the inclusion of Welsh buildings on the statutory lists) states that it is "coherently designed in an early Gothic style which is apt for its scale".
