= St Caian's Church, Tregaian =

Coordinates: 53.291621°N 4.324948°W

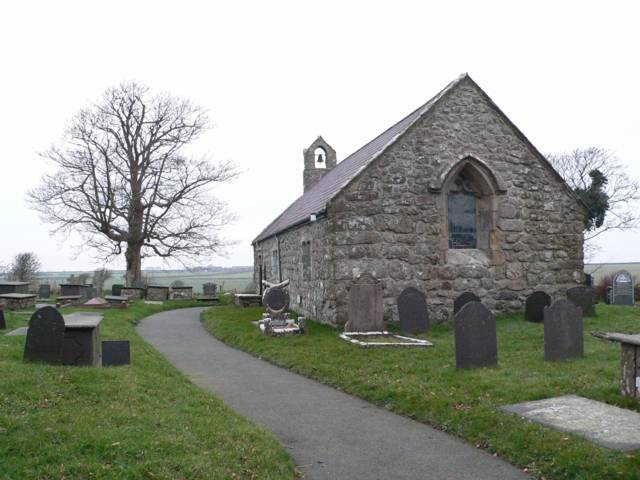
- The 14th-century window at the east end of the church

- Location in Anglesey
- Location: Tregaian, Anglesey
- Country: Wales
- Denomination: Church in Wales

History
- Status: Church
- Dedication: St Caian

Architecture
- Functional status: Active
- Heritage designation: Grade II*
- Designated: 12 May 1970
- Style: Medieval

Specifications
- Length: 40 ft 6 in (12.3 m)
- Width: 14 ft 6 in (4.4 m)
- Materials: Rubble masonry

Administration
- Province: Province of Wales
- Diocese: Diocese of Bangor
- Archdeaconry: Bangor
- Deanery: Malltraeth
- Parish: Llangefni with Tregaean with Llanddyfnan (Talwrn)

St Caian's Church, Tregaian, also known as St Caean's Church, Tregaean, is a small medieval church dating from the 14th century in Anglesey, north Wales. It is dedicated to St Caian, a Christian from the 5th or 6th century about whom little is known. The building contains a late 14th-century east window and a late 15th-century doorway. The churchyard contains the grave of William ap Howel, who died in 1581 at the age of 105, leaving over forty children between the ages of 8 and 89 and over three hundred living descendants.

The church is still used for worship by the Church in Wales, and is one of three churches in a combined parish. It is a Grade II* listed building, a national designation given to "particularly important buildings of more than special interest", in particular because it is regarded as "an excellent late Medieval rural church".

== History and location ==
The date of construction of the first Christian building on this site is unknown. The church is dedicated to St Caian, a Christian from the 5th or 6th century, about whom little is known. One manuscript says that his father was St Caw, a king in northern Britain who lost his lands and sought safety in Anglesey, where the ruler Maelgwn Gwynedd gave him land in the north-east of the island, the district known as Twrcelyn. If Caian was a son of St Caw, then his sisters included St Cwyllog, who established the nearby church of St Cwyllog, Llangwyllog, in the 6th century. Other manuscripts say that he was active in the 5th century and was a son or grandson of Brychan, a king from south Wales.

Caian gives his name to the hamlet of Tregaian in which the church is situated: the Welsh word tref (shortened here to tre) means "settlement", and "-gaian" is a modified form of the saint's name – i.e. "Caian's settlement". Tregaian is about 2.5 miles (4.0 km) north of Llangefni, the county town of Anglesey, and the church is in the countryside by a small road.

The present church is medieval, dating from the latter part of the 14th century, which is the period given to the east window. The doorway is from the late 15th century, the roof from the end of the 16th or beginning of the 17th century, and the nave windows and the panelling of the pulpit are from the 17th century. It is still used for worship by the Church in Wales, as one of three churches in the combined benefice of Llangefni with Tregaean with Llanddyfnan (Talwrn). It is within the deanery of Malltraeth, the archdeaconry of Bangor and the Diocese of Bangor. As of 2013, the priest in charge of the parish is the Reverend J Ashley-Roberts.

== Architecture and fittings ==
The church is built from rubble masonry. The roof, which is made from slate, has a stone bellcote at the west end. Entrance is through the doorway on the south side, from the late 15th century; it has decorated surrounds and a square frame. There is no structural division between the nave (where the congregation sit) and the chancel (where the altar is located) apart from a single step up into the chancel. The church is about 40 feet 6 inches (12.3 m) long by 14 feet 6 inches (4.4 m) wide. The east window, from the late 14th century, is set in a pointed arch with decorative edging. It has stained glass from 1916 depicting Christ crowning a knight with the words "Well done thou good and faithful servant / Take unto you the whole armour of God." There are two pairs of square-headed windows in the south wall, dating from the 17th century. On the north side of the church, a second entrance was blocked up in the late 19th century, and there is one pair of square-headed windows, also from the 17th century; there is also a small window at the west end of the church, from the 17th or 18th century. The beams of the roof can be seen from inside the church. Behind the altar is a panelled reredos from the 19th century.

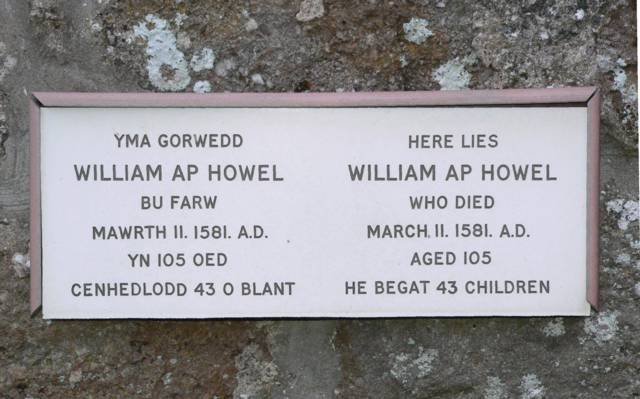
A memorial by an old gravestone

The church has a 12th-century circular font, decorated with an irregular pattern of chevrons on the side. The bell is dated 1717, whilst the pews are from the 19th century. There are memorials tablets from the 18th, 19th and 20th centuries on the walls, some of which commemorate the Lloyd family from a nearby house, Plas Tregaian. A 1937 survey by the Royal Commission on Ancient and Historical Monuments in Wales and Monmouthshire noted a plain silver cup dated 1714–15. The churchyard contains the grave of William ap Howel, who died at the age of 105 in 1581. Married three times, he fathered 42 or 43 children in and out of wedlock, and more than 300 of his descendants attended his funeral. His children at his death ranged in age from 8 to 89.

== Assessment ==
The church has national recognition and statutory protection from alteration as it has been designated as a Grade II* listed building – the second-highest of the three grades of listing, designating "particularly important buildings of more than special interest". It was given this status on 12 May 1970, and has been listed because it is "an excellent late Medieval rural church". Cadw (the Welsh Assembly Government body responsible for the built heritage of Wales and the inclusion of Welsh buildings on the statutory lists) also states that it "retains a strong simple character in the retention of many early features and its original plan, with structurally undivided nave and chancel."

The 19th-century antiquarian Angharad Llwyd described the church as "a small but neat edifice", and noted the "handsome" east window. The 19th-century writer Samuel Lewis said that the church was "simple and primitive in its construction". Writing in 1847, the clergyman and antiquarian Harry Longueville Jones said that the font was "remarkable" for having no drain, and was "hardly large enough for immersion." He added that the east window was of "rather singular" design.

A 2006 guide to the churches of Anglesey notes the "unusually wide" east window. A 2009 guide to the buildings of the region says that the church "gives an impression of what the Anglesey parish churches were like before so many were reassembled in the 19th century" – partly because the walls lean, it adds. The east window has also been compared to that of St Ceidio's Church, Rhodogeidio, also on Anglesey.
