= St Mary's Church, Bodewryd =

Coordinates: 53.38750°N 4.406946°W

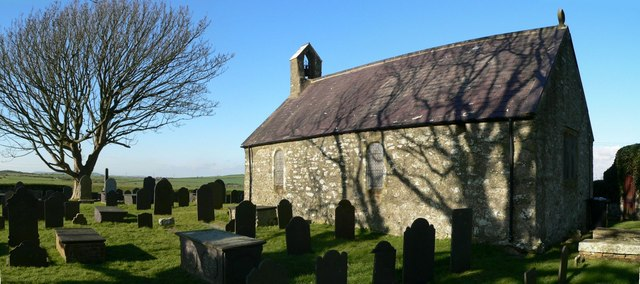
- The churchyard and south side of the church

- Location in Anglesey
- Location: Bodewryd, Anglesey
- Country: Wales
- Denomination: Church in Wales

History
- Status: Church
- Founded: Before 1254; earliest dateable feature of present building is c.1500
- Dedication: St Mary

Architecture
- Functional status: Active
- Heritage designation: Grade II
- Designated: 12 May 1970

Specifications
- Length: 34 feet 9 inches (10.6 m)
- Width: 14 feet (4.3 m)
- Materials: Rubble masonry

Administration
- Province: Province of Wales
- Diocese: Diocese of Bangor
- Archdeaconry: Bangor
- Deanery: Twrcelyn
- Parish: Llanfechell with Bodewryd with Rhosbeirio with Llanfflewin and Llanbadrig

Clergy
- Vicar: Canon G W Edwards

St Mary's Church, Bodewryd (Welsh: [bod'ɛrʊi̯d]) is a small medieval church in the hamlet of Bodewryd, in Anglesey, north Wales. The date of construction is unknown, but there was a church on this site in 1254 and the earliest feature to which a date can be given is a doorway in a 15th-century style dating to around 1500. When the church was restored in 1867 after being struck by lightning, stained glass with Islamic-influenced patterns was included in the windows, a requirement of Lord Stanley of Alderley, the church's benefactor, who was a convert to Islam.

The church is used for worship by the Church in Wales, and is one of five churches in a combined parish. It is a Grade II listed building, a national designation given to "buildings of special interest, which warrant every effort being made to preserve them", in particular because it is a "simple, rural church of Medieval origins."

== History and location ==
The date of foundation of the first religious building on this site is unknown. A church was recorded here in the Norwich Taxation of 1254, and the church was owned by the Augustinian priory at Penmon, at the south-eastern corner of Anglesey, during the 13th century; the priory also owned (and therefore received the tithes from) the Anglesey churches of Llanddona and St Cwyllog, Llangwyllog at this time. The current building has medieval walls, and the doorway of the porch on the north side of the church, which is of 15th-century style, is the oldest dateable part of the building. A 2009 guide to the buildings of north-west Wales put the date for the doorway at c.1500. St Mary's was restored in 1867 by Henry Kennedy, the architect of the Diocese of Bangor, after the previous church was struck by lightning. It was funded by Lord Stanley of Alderley, a convert to Islam, whose donations to rural churches carried the requirement that Islamic detail should be included in any restoration work. At St Mary's, the windows have geometric patterns of small panes of coloured glass as a result. This condition was also imposed by him for the restoration work at the nearby church of St Peirio, Rhosbeirio (now closed), where the new windows were also decorated with geometric patterns in glass.

For many years, the church was associated with the Wynn (or Wynne) family of Bodewryd. They had an estate at Bodewryd from 1521 until 1755, when Edward Wynne (Chancellor of the Diocese of Hereford from 1707 to 1754) died without male heirs. (Note: The estate passed to the grand-daughter of his sister. The heiress, Margaret Owen, married Sir John Stanley, baronet; their son was ennobled as the first Baron Stanley of Alderley, grandfather of the church's 1867 benefactor (the third Baron).) His uncle, Humphrey Humphreys (who was Bishop of Bangor and then Bishop of Hereford), was married in St Mary's in 1690; the bishop's sister had married into the Wynne family in 1672.

The church is by the side of the road in Bodewryd, in the north of Anglesey, about 3 miles (4.8 km) from the town of Amlwch. It is surrounded by a rectangular churchyard, entered through a wooden gate. It is still in use for worship, belonging to the Church in Wales, and is part of the combined parish of Llanfechell with Bodewryd with Rhosbeirio with Llanfflewin and Llanbadrig. It is within the deanery of Twrcelyn, the archdeaconry of Bangor and the Diocese of Bangor. As of 2012, the rector is the Reverend Canon G W Edwards. The church was used at one time as a chapel of ease for St Eilian's Church, Llaneilian.

== Architecture and fittings ==
The rectangular church, which has been described as "tiny", is said by the Diocese of Bangor to be the second-smallest church in Anglesey. (Note: The Diocese of Bangor does not explain whether this is based on length, floor surface area, or cubic capacity of the building, nor does it state what the smallest church in Anglesey is, or whether the comparisons include former churches, whether in ruins or not. For comparison, St Tysilio's Church, Menai Bridge, which is still in use, is 33 feet 9 inches (10.29 m) long, 1 foot shorter than St Mary's, but is slightly wider and has a larger floor surface area overall, whilst the ruined churches of St Michael, Llanfihangel Ysgeifiog, Capel Lligwy and St Mary, Rhodogeidio all have smaller floor surface areas than St Mary's, Bodewryd.) The nave and chancel (which are not divided) measure together 34 feet 9 inches by 14 feet (about 10.6 m by 4.3 m). The church is constructed of rubble masonry, dressed with freestone and with a foundation of boulders. The roof, which has a bellcote at the west end, is made of slate; the roof timbers can be seen from inside. The only bell, which is dated 1747, is decorated with a vine scroll. The door to the church is on the north side through a porch; the doorway to the porch has a rounded head and a 15th-century style doorjamb, but the porch itself is more modern. The windows in the nave (one in the north wall, one in the west wall and two in the south wall) have rounded tops. The window at the east end of the church, which dates from the late 16th century, is rectangular with three arched lights (vertical sections) set in a square frame. The lights are separated by mullions and there is an external hoodmould above the window.

There are two fonts: one, which may be medieval in origin, is a gritstone bowl of rectangular shape; the other, which may have been added during the 19th-century restoration, is an oval alabaster bowl, with rich decoration. The south wall of the chancel has a brass tablet to mark money received from Queen Anne's Bounty in 1720 and Robert Wynn, rector of Llantrisant, Anglesey, in 1727. There are various memorials on the interior walls. Edward Wynne (who is buried in the churchyard), his siblings and parents are commemorated by various brass tablets. The 1937 survey of the church by the Royal Commission on Ancient and Historical Monuments in Wales and Monmouthshire claims that seven generations of Wynne's male ancestors were buried in the church, beginning with Rees ap Llewelyn in 1500. The survey also recorded that the church possessed a silver cup from about 1641 donated by Wynne, a silver cup and paten donated by his sister Ellin in 1703, and part of an oak table top with a Latin inscription and the date 1611.

== Assessment ==
The church has national recognition and statutory protection from alteration as it has been designated as a Grade II listed building – the lowest of the three grades of listing, designating "buildings of special interest, which warrant every effort being made to preserve them". It was given this status on 12 May 1970 and has been listed as "a simple, rural church of Medieval origins". Cadw (the Welsh Assembly Government body responsible for the built heritage of Wales and for the inclusion of Welsh buildings on the statutory lists) notes that it "retains Medieval fabric but is largely of 19th-century character", describing it as a "simple vernacular building."

The 19th-century antiquarian Angharad Llwyd described the church as a "small ancient edifice". She noted the memorials to the Wynnes as well as a tablet marking Edward Wynne's "munificence": she recorded that he had donated 121 acres (49 ha) in 1722 and a rent charge of £2 to endow the living, and that £800 was also received from Queen Anne's Bounty. A 2006 guide to the churches of the county describes it as "one of the smallest churches in Anglesey", and says that it stood "in a pleasant location."
