= St Maelog's Church, Llanfaelog =

Coordinates: 53°13′40″N 4°29′34″W

St Maelog's Church
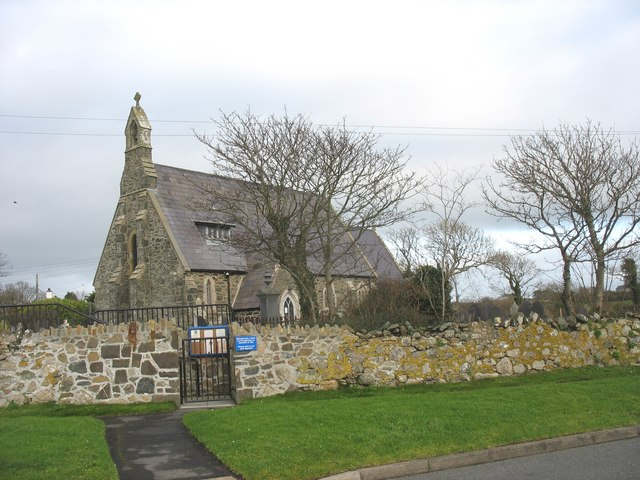
- St Maelog's Church
- Country: Wales
- Denomination: Church in Wales

Architecture
- Heritage designation: Grade II
- Designated: 4 May 1971
- Architectural type: Church
- Style: Medieval

St Maelog's Church is a church in the village of Llanfaelog, situated in the Isle of Anglesey, Wales. The present building dates from the 19th century. It was designated as a Grade II listed building on 4 May 1971.

== History and architecture ==
The church is dedicated to Saint Maelog. There has been a church on the current site since the 6th century. The present church was erected in 1848 in the Gothic Revival style; the architect was Henry Kennedy of Bangor. It was designated as a Grade II listed building on 4 May 1971.
