= St Benedict's Church, Gyffin =

Church in Conwy County Borough, Wales

Coordinates: 53.2753°N 3.8364°W

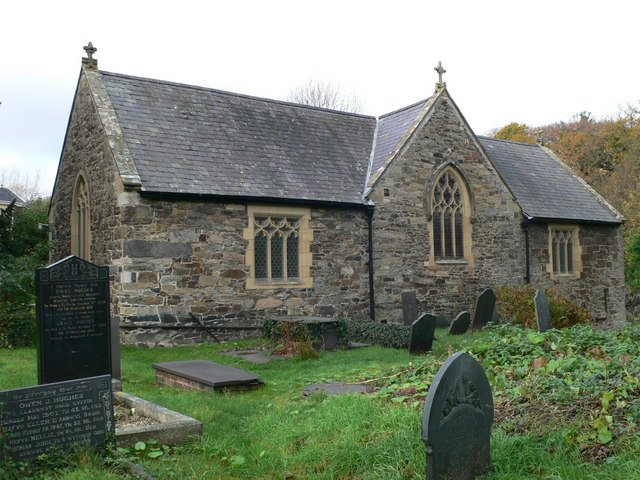

- Location in Conwy County Borough
- OS grid reference: SH 776 769
- Location: Gyffin, Conwy, Conwy County Borough
- Country: Wales
- Denomination: Church in Wales

History
- Status: active
- Dedication: Saint Benedict

Architecture
- Heritage designation: Grade I
- Designated: 23 September 1950
- Architectural type: Church
- Groundbreaking: 1300, with earlier origins

Administration
- Diocese: Bangor
- Archdeaconry: Bangor
- Deanery: Synod Bangor
- Parish: Bro Celynnin

St Benedict's Church is an active parish church in Gyffin, Conwy, Conwy County Borough, Wales. Formerly a village, and now a suburb of the town, Gyffin lies immediately south of Conwy on the south bank of Afon Gyffin. Cadw records that the present church dates from c.1300, although possibly with earlier origins. The church is designated a Grade I listed building.

== History ==
The church dates to at least the 13th century. The nave and most of the existing fabric is later medieval, and the porch and chapel are later than that. The church was extensively restored in 1858. The Royal Commission on the Ancient and Historical Monuments of Wales (RCAHMW) records the church's most notable feature as being the chancel's painted ceiling. This has 16 panels depicting saints. Richard Haslam, Julian Orbach and Adam Voelcker, in their 2009 edition Gywnedd, in the Buildings of Wales series, note that the paintings, "though not of high quality, are worth seeing".

The church remains an active parish church in the Diocese of Bangor and regular services are held.

== Architecture and description ==
St Benedicts is a small and simple church comprising a nave, chancel with side chapels and a vestry. The construction material is local rubble, under a slate roof. St Benedict's is a Grade I listed building. The wall surrounding the churchyard and its gates, and three grave stones are also listed, all at Grade II.

== Sources ==
- Haslam, Richard; Orbach, Julian; Voelcker, Adam (2009). Gwynedd. The Buildings of Wales. New Haven, US and London: Yale University Press. ISBN 978-0-300-14169-6. OCLC 1023292902.
