= St Peirio's Church, Rhosbeirio =

Coordinates: 53.397962°N 4.421301°W

St Peirio's Church
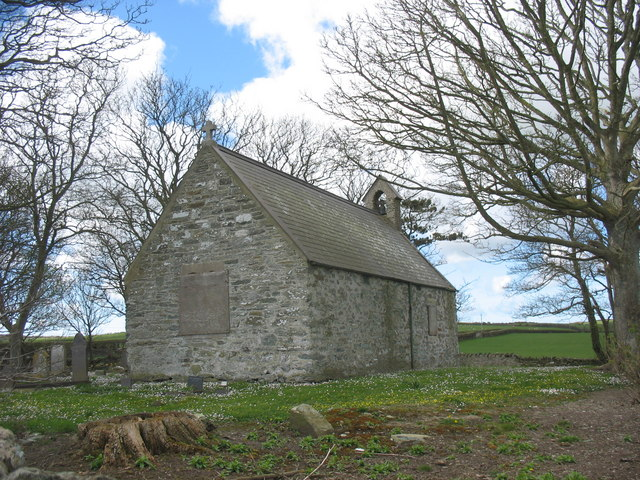
- The church from the east

- Location in Anglesey
- Location: Rhosbeirio, Anglesey
- Country: Wales

History
- Status: Church
- Founded: 605 (reputedly); Current building said to date from no earlier than the 15th century
- Dedication: St Peirio

Architecture
- Functional status: Closed
- Heritage designation: Grade II
- Designated: 12 May 1970
- Style: Medieval

Specifications
- Length: 36 ft (11.0 m)
- Width: 13 ft 9 in (4.2 m)
- Materials: Rubble masonry

St Peirio's Church is a small disused medieval church, in Rhosbeirio, Anglesey, north Wales. It is unclear when a church was first established on this site, although it has been said that this happened in about 605. The current structure, which may date from the 15th century, has been restored in the 18th and 19th centuries. It ceased being used for services some years ago and has been boarded up.

It is a Grade II listed building, a national designation given to "buildings of special interest, which warrant every effort being made to preserve them", as "a simple, rural Medieval church" that retains "much of its original vernacular character" despite alterations. One 19th-century writer said that it was "one of the humblest ecclesiastical buildings in Anglesey", and that there were "no architectural features in this church worthy of delineation."

== History and location ==
The date of the original foundation of a Christian building at this location is unclear, although one 19th-century writer said that it is supposed that a church was first established here in about 605. No part of a building from that period survives; the walls of the present structure have been said (by the 19th-century clergyman and antiquarian Harry Longueville Jones) to be "probably not older than the fifteenth century". Some restoration took place in 1812. The building was again restored, and a new roof added, in the late 19th century. The work was funded by Lord Stanley of Alderley, a convert to Islam and patron of the church, whose donations to rural churches carried the requirement that Islamic detail should be included in any restoration work. At St Peirio's, the windows have geometric patterns of small panes of coloured glass as a result. The same condition was imposed by him for the work carried out in 1867 nearby at St Mary's Church, Bodewryd.

St Peirio's is set in a churchyard in the countryside of Anglesey, by a road between Llanfechell and Bodewryd, to the north of the island, and is approached along a tree-lined path. It is about 2.25 kilometres (1.40 mi) from St Mechell's Church, Llanfechell (which is still in use), and at one point was a chapel of ease to St Eilian's Church, Llaneilian. In her history of Anglesey, published in 1833, the Welsh antiquarian Angharad Llwyd noted that the "small ancient edifice" was some distance from the village of Rhosbeirio, and that a service was only held in it on the third Sunday of the month. By the time of the publication of a guide to the churches of Anglesey in 2006, the church had been closed for some years and the windows boarded up; it was noted that the fabric was still in generally good condition.

== Architecture and fittings ==
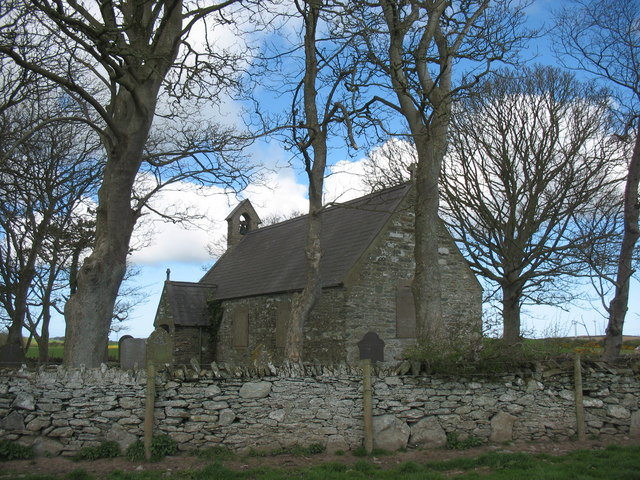
The church from the south-west, showing the porch to the left

The church is built from rubble masonry dressed with freestone, and it has a slate roof, with a bellcote at the west end and stone crosses on the porch and chancel roofs. The timbers of the roof can be seen from inside. The walls have been assessed as being "probably not older than the fifteenth century". There is no internal division between the nave and the chancel, and the church as a whole is 36 feet (11 m) long by 13 feet 9 inches (4.19 m) wide. The porch, at the west end of the south wall, was added in the late 19th century. There is one window in the north wall and two in the south wall, all of which are single windows set in rectangular frames; the east window has a pair of lights (vertical sections of window separated by a mullion). All the windows date from the late 19th century. The plain bowl-shaped font dates from the 12th century. There is a brass memorial plaque recording three people who died in the 1640s. The 1937 survey by the Royal Commission on Ancient and Historical Monuments in Wales and Monmouthshire recorded that the church possessed a silver cup from 1630 and a salver dated 1784–85. The churchyard contains some gravestones, including a few dating from the 1980s and 1990s.

== Assessment ==
The church has national recognition and statutory protection from alteration as it has been designated as a Grade II listed building – the lowest of the three grades of listing, designating "buildings of special interest, which warrant every effort being made to preserve them". It was given this status on 12 May 1970, and has been listed as "a simple, rural Medieval church". Cadw (the Welsh Assembly Government body responsible for the built heritage of Wales and the inclusion of Welsh buildings on the statutory lists) also notes that it retains "much of its original vernacular character", despite the 19th-century alterations.

Writing in 1861, Harry Longueville Jones said of St Peirio's that it was "one of the humblest ecclesiastical buildings in Anglesey". He said that there were "no architectural features in this church worthy of delineation."
