= St Ceinwen's Church, Llangeinwen =

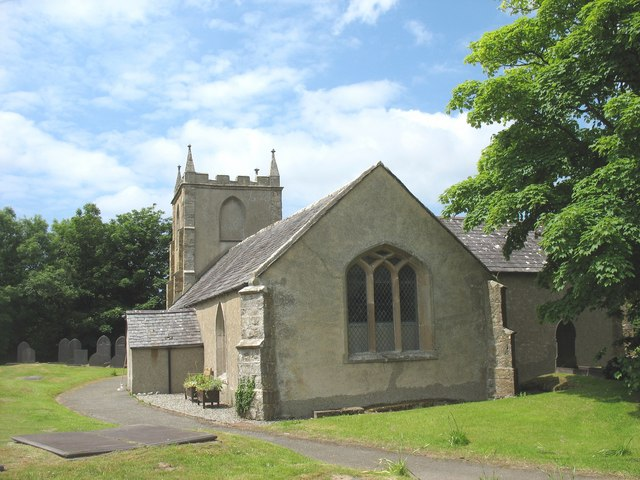
- The East window of St Ceinwen's Church
- St Ceinwen's Church, Llangeinwen
- 53.16656°N 4.33554°W
- Location: Llangeinwen
- Country: Wales
- Denomination: Church in Wales

History
- Dedication: St Ceinwen

Architecture
- Heritage designation: Grade II*

Administration
- Province: Province of Wales
- Diocese: Diocese of Bangor

St Ceinwen's Church, Llangeinwen, is a Grade II* listed building in Anglesey, north Wales. It is 1.5 kilometres (0.93 mi) from the neighbouring St Mary's Church, Llanfair-yn-y-Cwmwd.

The historic environment service of the Welsh government, Cadw, says that:

Two sisters, Ceinwen and Dwynwen, founded this church and the now-ruined church on nearby Llanddwyn Island. Both churches were subsequently dedicated to their founders, which is unusual. The present building at Llangeinwen is 12th century and has been in constant use since then. It is grade II* listed. The north and south walls of the nave are of this period, those of the chancel being medieval. The north chapel was added in 19th century as was the tower; gravestones of 9th and 11th centuries are built into the buttresses. The decorated stone font is 13th century. There is a blocked up 12th century doorway on the north wall of the nave. The brass chandeliers are from the early 19th century.

Named for St Ceinwen, the church is located within an enclosed churchyard on the NW side of the A4080, 800m West of the village of Dwyran.
