= St Mary and St Egryn's Church, Llanegryn =

St Mary and St Egryn's Church
- Eglwys Egryn Sant
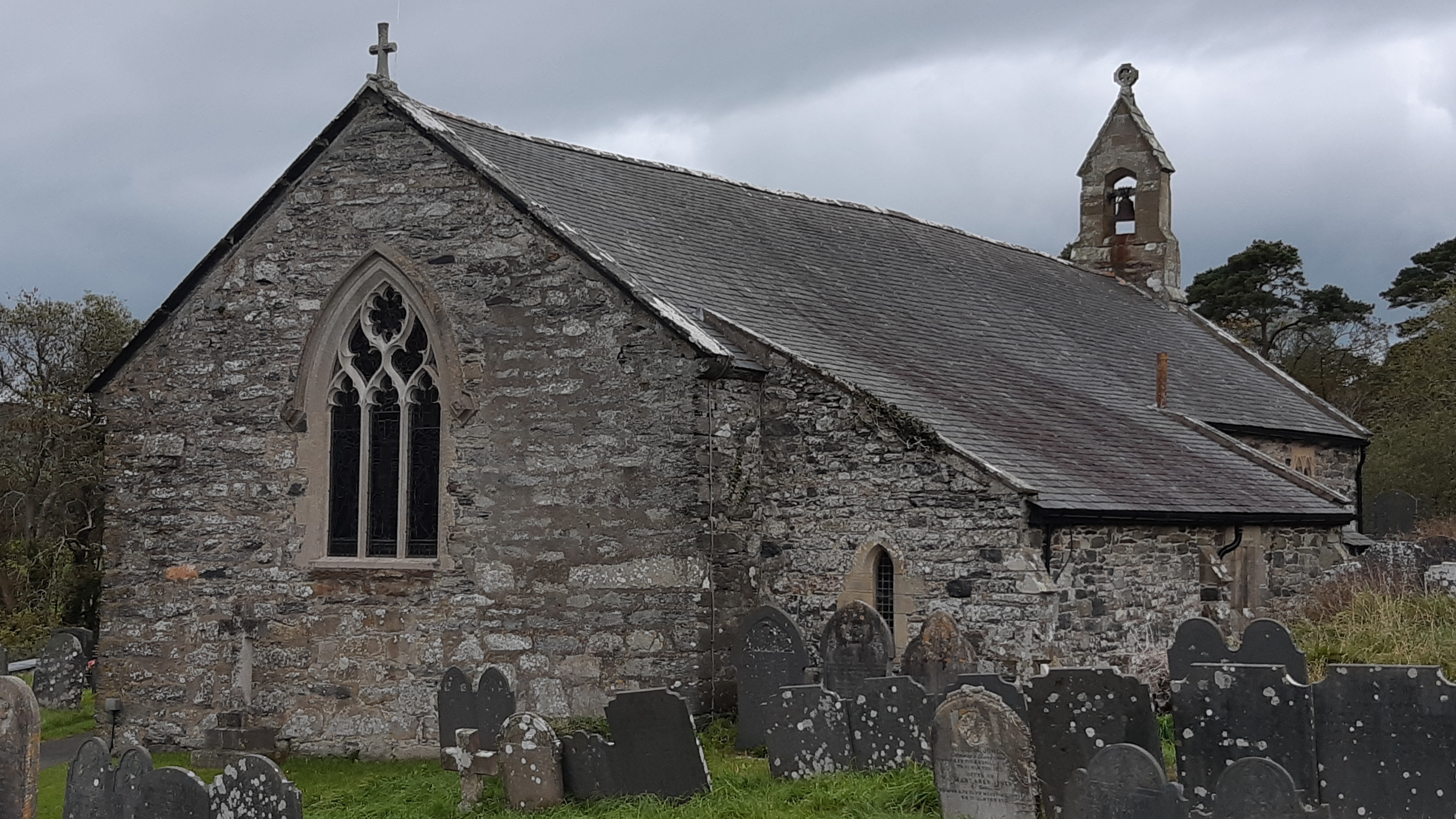

- Location in Gwynedd
- 52.6316°N 4.0757°W
- Location: Llanegryn, Gwynedd
- Country: Wales
- Denomination: Anglican (Church in Wales)

History
- Status: Parish church
- Founder: Egryn
- Dedication: Egryn and Saint Mary

Architecture
- Functional status: Active
- Heritage designation: Grade I
- Designated: 17 June 1966

Administration
- Diocese: Bangor
- Archdeaconry: Meirionnydd
- Benefice: Synod Meirionnydd
- Parish: Bro Ystumanner

St Mary and St Egryn's Church is located north of the village of Llanegryn, Gwynedd, Wales. The church is dedicated to Egryn, a Welsh saint and Saint Mary. The church has a notable rood screen, described as "among the best in Wales". It is a Grade I listed building.

== History ==
The village of Llanegryn is 4 miles (6 km) north-east of Tywyn and 17 miles (27 km) south-west of Dolgellau, in the southern part of the principal area. The church stands someway to the north and is dedicated to Egryn, a Welsh saint and Saint Mary. It dates from the 14th century, although with earlier origins. The lychgate is also late medieval in origin.

The church remains an active parish church in the Diocese of Bangor and occasional services are held.

== Architecture and description ==
St Mary and St Egryn's is constructed to a simple plan, a short, combined, nave and chancel with a south porch, vestry and bellcote. The building material is local rubble. Richard Haslam, Julian Orbach and Adam Voelcker, in their 2009 edition Gywnedd, in the Buildings of Wales series, describe the church's rood screen as, "among the best in Wales". Tradition suggests it was brought to the church from Cymer Abbey but the Royal Commission on the Ancient and Historical Monuments of Wales (RCAHMW) notes that there is no evidence to support this. The screen, its loft, and the stair by which the loft is accessed, are carved with "intricate, delicate ornament", depicting flowers, animals and patterns, and once had "framed statuettes". St Mary and St Egryn's is a Grade I listed building. The lychgate is listed at Grade II.

== Gallery ==
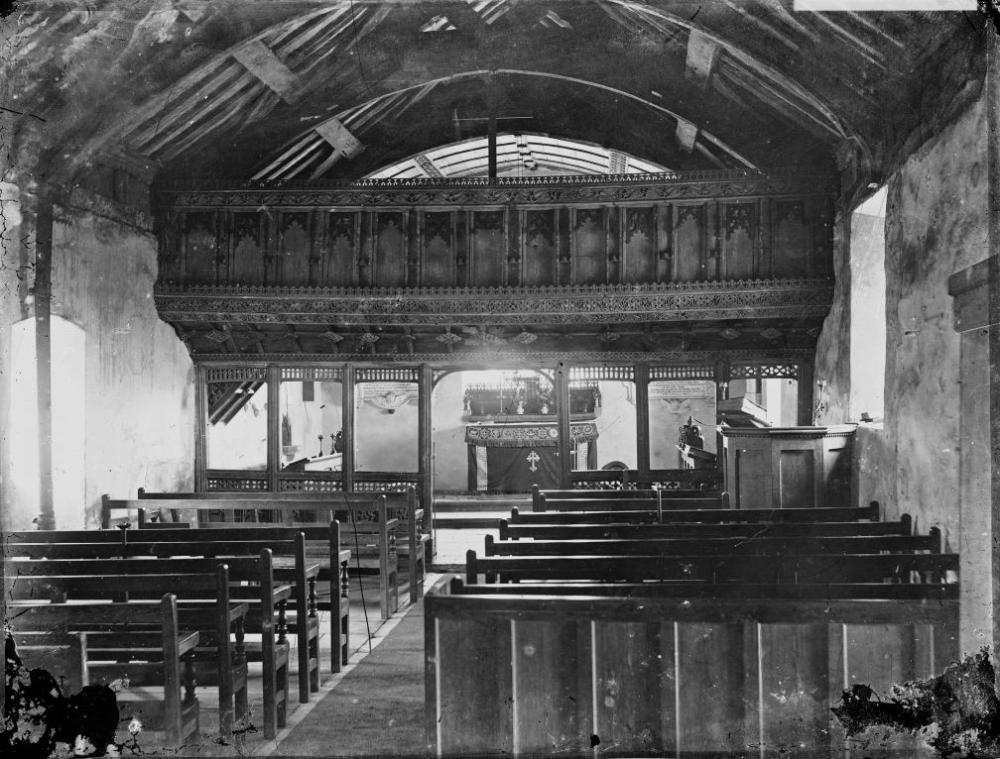
Interior - view of the rood screen

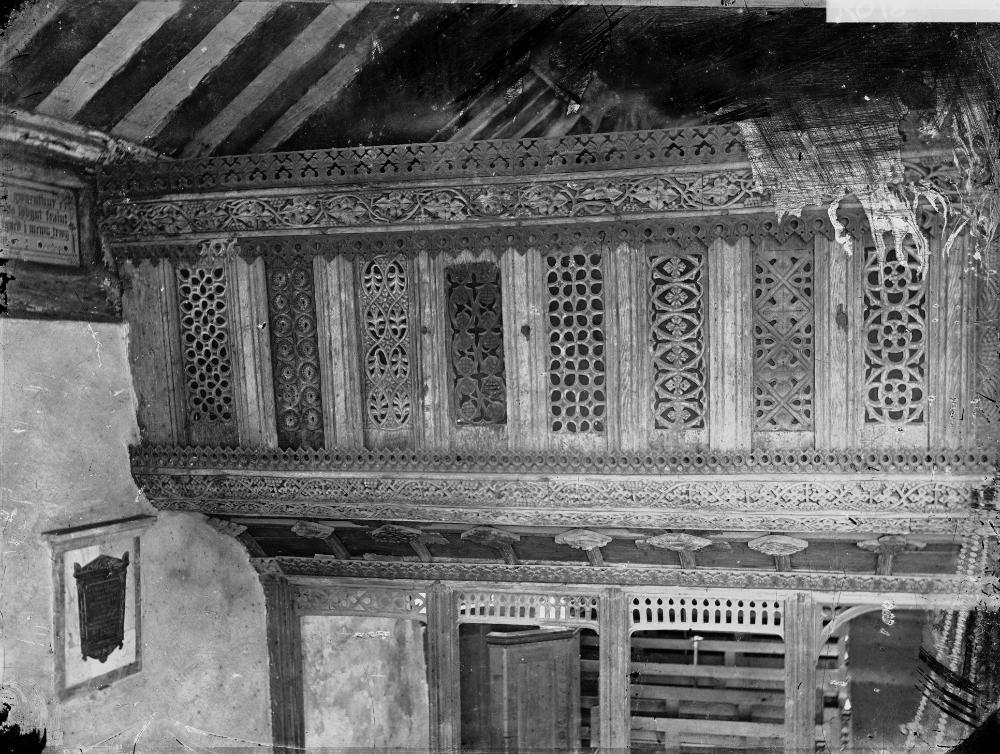
Interior - view of the rood screen

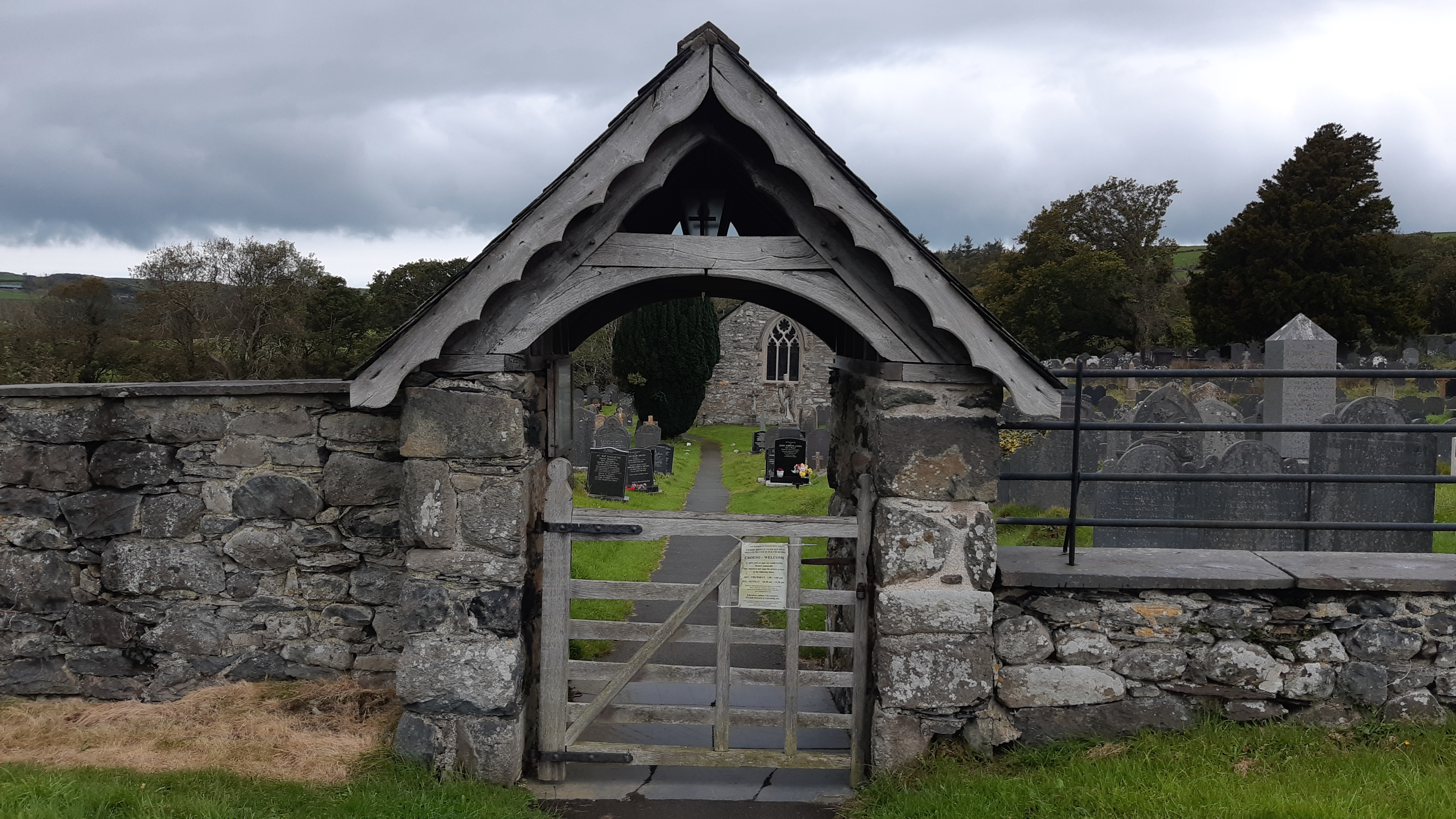
The lychgate

== Sources ==
- Haslam, Richard; Orbach, Julian; Voelcker, Adam (2009). Gwynedd. The Buildings of Wales. New Haven, US and London: Yale University Press. ISBN 978-0-300-14169-6. OCLC 1023292902.
