= Llangeinwen =

Village in Anglesey, Wales

Coordinates: 53°9′59.627″N 4°20′8.516″W

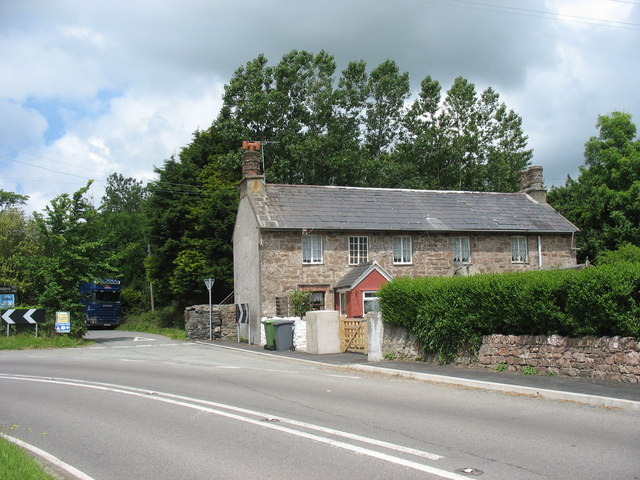

- Location within Anglesey
- Community: Rhosyr
- Principal area: Anglesey
- Preserved county: Anglesey
- Country: Wales
- Sovereign state: United Kingdom
- Post town: RHOSYR
- Postcode district: LL60
- Dialling code: 01248
- Police: North Wales
- Fire: North Wales
- Ambulance: Welsh
- UK Parliament: Ynys Môn
- Senedd Cymru – Welsh Parliament: Bangor Conwy Môn

Llangeinwen is a village on the island of Anglesey in the community of Rhosyr. Until 1984 it was a community itself.

It is the location of St Ceinwen's Church, Llangeinwen.

Welsh educator and founder of Aberystwyth University, Hugh Owen was born in the village.
