= Longueville baronets =

Extinct baronetcy in the Baronetage of Nova Scotia

The Longueville Baronetcy, of Wolverton in the County of Buckingham, was a title in the Baronetage of Nova Scotia. It was created on 17 December 1638 for Edward Longueville. The title became either extinct or dormant on the death of the fourth Baronet in 1759.

== Longueville baronets, of Wolverton (1638) ==
- Sir Edward Longueville, 1st Baronet (1604–1661)
- Sir Thomas Longueville, 2nd Baronet (c. 1631 – 1685)
- Sir Edward Longueville, 3rd Baronet (1662–1718)
- Sir Thomas Longueville, 4th Baronet (died 1759)
