= St Padrig's Church, Llanbadrig =

Coordinates: 53.4235°N 4.4453°W

St Padrig's Church
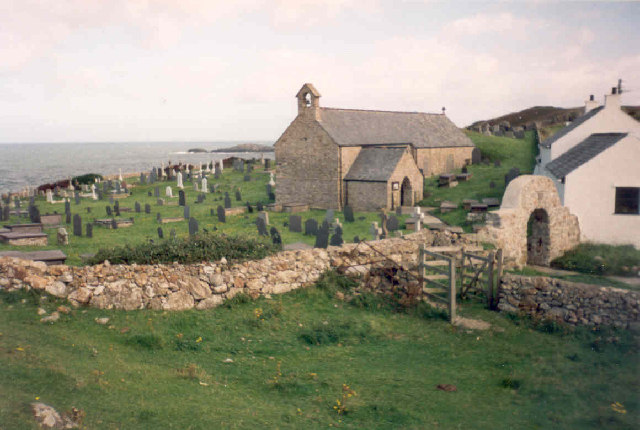
- St Padrig's Church
- Country: Wales
- Denomination: Church in Wales

Architecture
- Heritage designation: Grade II*
- Designated: 5 December 1970
- Architectural type: Church
- Style: Medieval

St Padrig's Church is a medieval church in the village of Llanbadrig, Anglesey, Wales. The building probably dates from the 12th century and underwent renovations in the 19th century. It was designated a Grade II* listed building on 5 December 1970.

== History ==
Legend has it that Saint Patrick was sent to Ireland in the fifth century by Pope Celestine I on a mission to convert the Irish to Christianity. On his return, he was shipwrecked on Middle Mouse (Ynys Badrig), an island half a mile off the northern coast of Anglesey. Here he found shelter in a cave, and when later he made his way to the mainland of Anglesey, he built a church above the nearby cliffs in thankfulness for his safety. Nothing of this wooden structure remains, but the present stone building may have originated in the twelfth century and the font has also been dated to that period. The church existed in 1254 when it appeared in the Norwich Taxation, an assessment of clergy property made for the purposes of taxation. The nave and the chancel were built at two distinct times, with the nave probably being built in the twelfth or thirteenth centuries and the chancel later. The chancel arch may be early fourteenth century. The east window in the chancel is probably sixteenth century but the other windows are later, probably reglazed in 1812 or 1840 when various restoration work took place, or in 1884 when more comprehensive work was undertaken.

The church fell into disuse after a new church was opened in Cemaes in the late nineteenth century. In 1985, funds were raised for repairs and restoration of St Padric, but soon after the church reopened there was a fire, thought to have been started by vandals, destroying much of the roof. Further funds were raised and the structure repaired, with the church being reconsecrated in 1987.
