= Rhedyw =

Rhedyw (Latin: Redicus) was an early Welsh Saint linked with Llanllyfni, Gwynedd. He was probably born towards the beginning of the 5th century.

== Story and tradition ==
Little is known about Rhedyw. There is a church dedicated in Llanllyfni to him, and it is said that the first church on the site was founded in the fourth century. He is said to be born in Arfon and became an important official in the church in Augustodunum (today Autun) in Gaul.

== Llanllyfni ==
His Gŵyl Mabsant, or "festival day", is 6 July, when it is celebrated in Llanllyfni each year. There is a well near the church, once used for baptising. There is also the megalith Eisteddfa Rhedyw on Llanllyfni Mountain.
