= St Catherine's Church, Llanfaes =

Coordinates: 53°16′46″N 4°05′40″W

St Catherine's Church
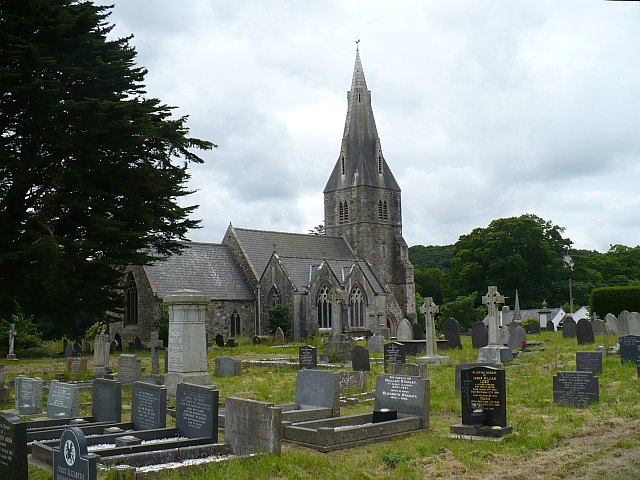
- St Catherine's Church
- Location: Llanfaes
- Country: Wales
- Denomination: Church in Wales

Architecture
- Heritage designation: Grade II
- Designated: 20 February 1978
- Architectural type: Church
- Style: Medieval

St Catherine's Church is a church in the village of Llanfaes, Anglesey, Wales. The building dates from the 19th century. It was designated as Grade II-listed building on 20 February 1978.

== History ==
St Catherine's Church has origins dating from the medieval era, however the oldest part of the current structure is the west tower, which was built in 1811 by Lord Bulkeley. The current nave, chancel, porch and tower spire were all built in 1845 by architects from Sheffield. The organ chamber was added in 1890 by Henry Kennedy, an architect from Bangor. It was designated a Grade II-listed building on 20 February 1978.
