= St Michael's Church, Llanfihangel Din Sylwy =

Church in Anglesey, Wales

Coordinates: 53.3116°N 4.1208°W

St Michael's Church
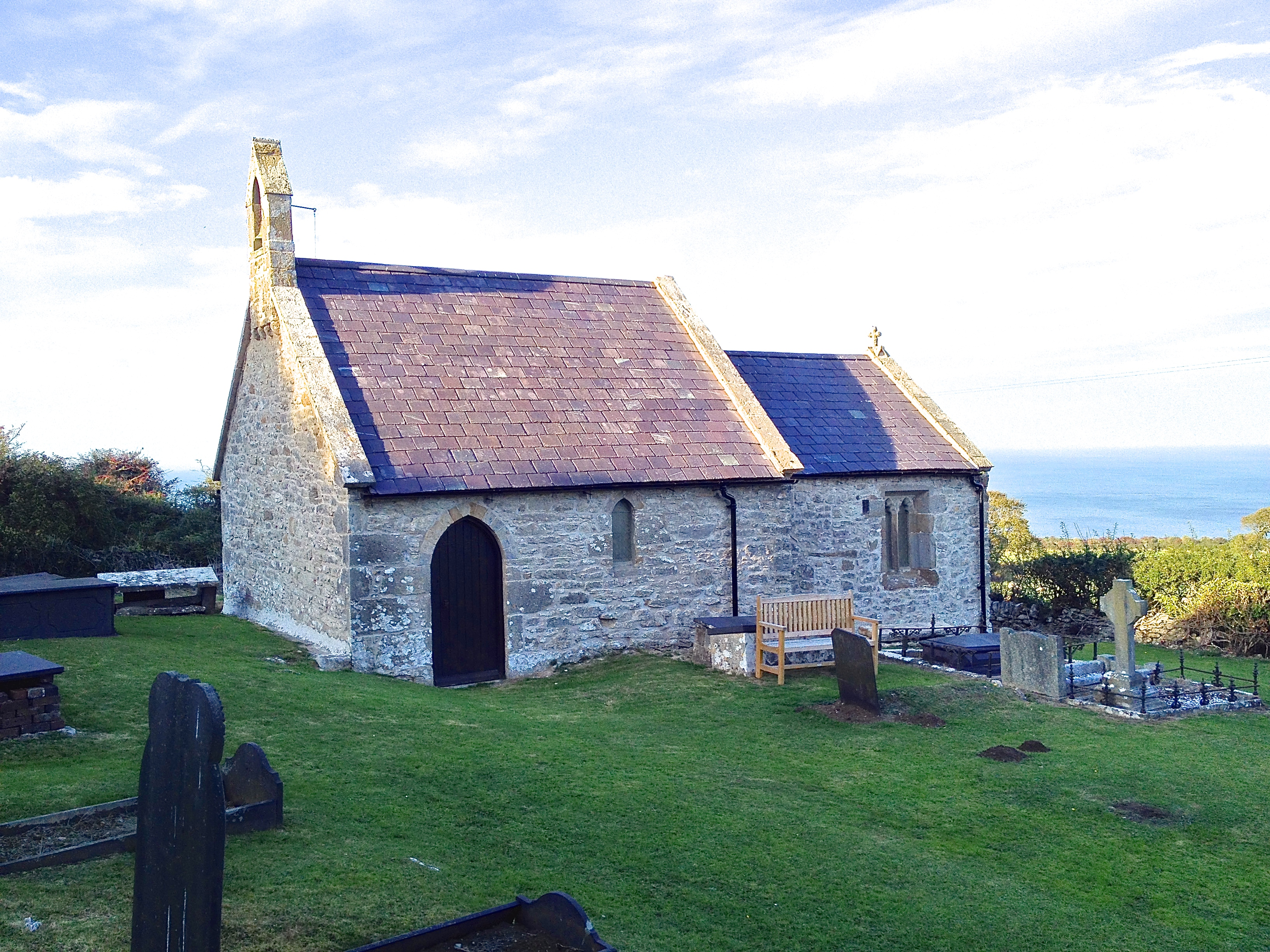
- St Michael's Church
- Country: Wales
- Denomination: Church in Wales

Architecture
- Heritage designation: Grade II*
- Designated: 30 January 1968
- Architectural type: Church
- Style: Medieval

St Michael's Church is a medieval church in the village of Llanfihangel Din Sylwy, Anglesey, Wales. The building dates from the 15th century and was rebuilt in 1855. It was designated a Grade II*-listed building on 30 January 1968.

== History and architecture ==
St Michael's Church was first mentioned in the Norwich Taxation of 1254, however the present church dates from the early 15th century. The structure was rebuilt in 1855. The oldest part of the current structure is the chancel arch, which dates from the 15th century. The framed windows in the southern wall below the chancel also date from the 15th century. It was designated a Grade II*-listed building on 30 January 1968.
