= St Dyfnan's Church, Llanddyfnan =

Coordinates: 53.2841°N 4.2474°W

St Dyfnan's Church
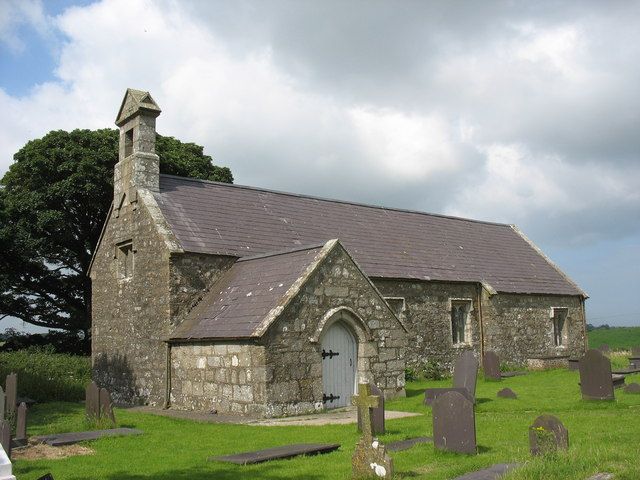
- St Dyfnan's Church
- Country: Wales
- Denomination: Church in Wales

Architecture
- Heritage designation: Grade II*
- Designated: 5 December 2007
- Architectural type: Church
- Style: Medieval

St Dyfnan's Church is a medieval church in the village of Llanddyfnan, Anglesey, Wales. The building dates from the 14th century and underwent extensive renovations in the mid-19th century. The church lies north from the B5109 road. It was designated as a Grade II*-listed building on 5 December 2007.
