= St Cawrdaf's Church, Llangoed =

Coordinates: 53°18′14″N 4°05′05″W

St Cawrdaf's Church
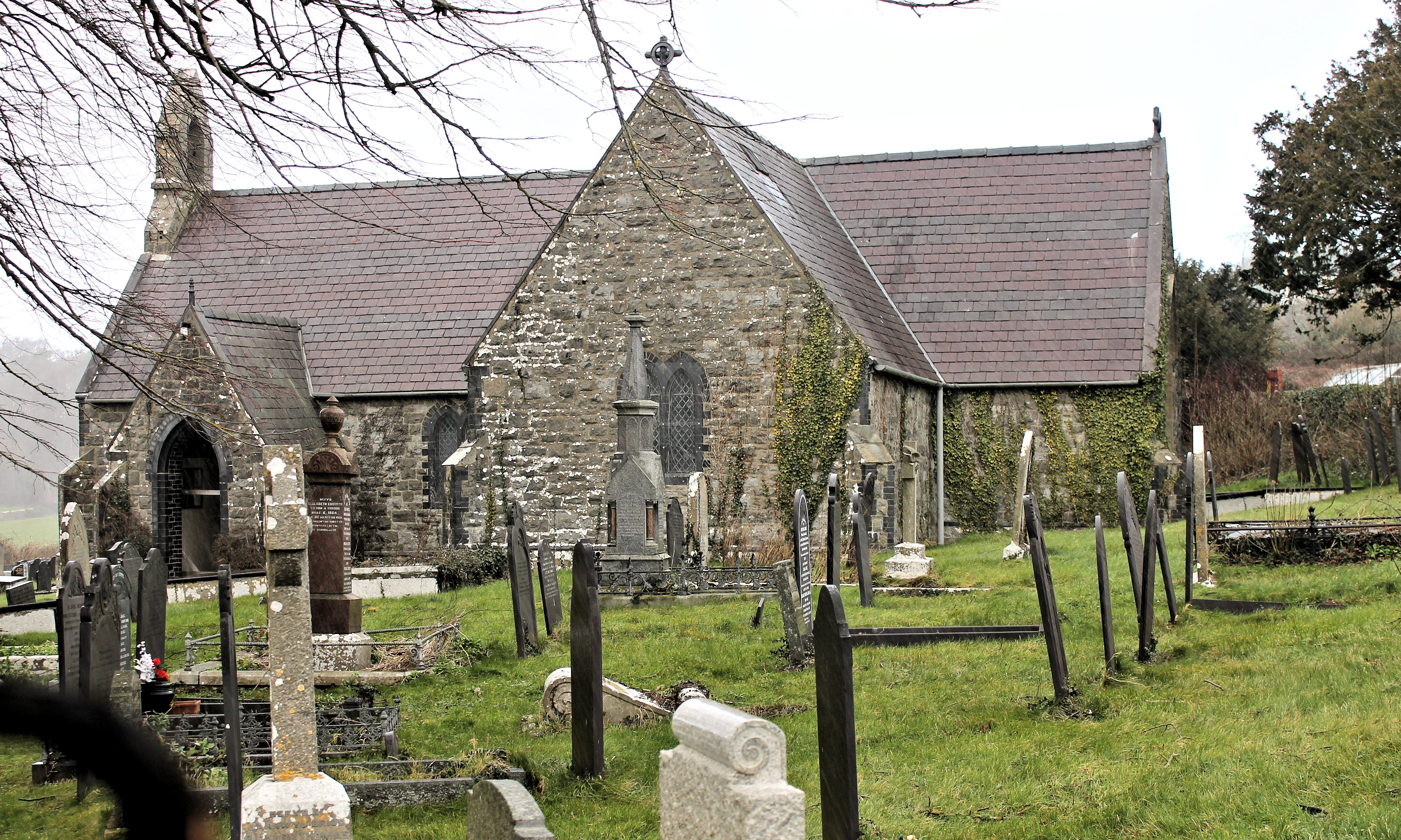
- St Cawrdaf's Church
- Country: Wales
- Denomination: Church in Wales

Architecture
- Heritage designation: Grade II
- Designated: 30 January 1968
- Architectural type: Church
- Style: Medieval

St Cawrdaf's Church is a church in the village of Llangoed, Isle of Anglesey, Wales. The building dates from the 17th century and underwent renovations in the 19th century. It was designated a Grade II-listed building on 30 January 1968.
