= St Mary's Church, Llanfairpwllgwyngyll =

Church in Llanfairpwll, Anglesey, Wales

Coordinates: 53.2174°N 4.1914°W

St Mary's Church
- Church of St Mary
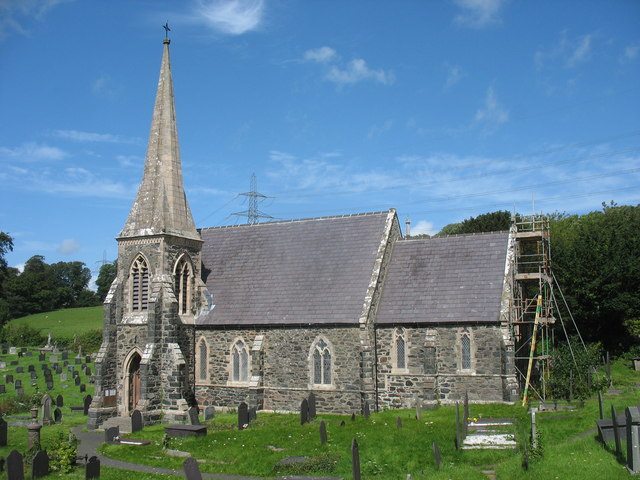
- St Mary's Church
- Denomination: Church in Wales
- Previous denomination: Church of England

History
- Status: active
- Dedication: Virgin Mary
- Consecrated: 1853

Architecture
- Heritage designation: Grade II
- Designated: 1998
- Years built: 1853

Administration
- Diocese: Diocese of Bangor
- Parish: Llanfairpwll & Llanddaniel-fab

St Mary's Church is a Church in Wales parish church in Llanfairpwllgwyngyll, Anglesey, Wales. It was built in 1853 to serve the village in the Diocese of Bangor and is a Grade II-listed building.

== History ==
Before St Mary's Church was erected there was an earlier church dedicated to the Virgin Mary on the site. In 1853, during the heyday of Victorian restorationism, the old church was rebuilt using stone rubble at a cost of £950. It was later re-consecrated in the same year by the Bishop of Bangor. Several of the fittings in the old church were replaced but the original baptismal font was retained and installed in the new church.

The church's stained glass windows were gradually replaced by several benefactors. The east window showing several Biblical scenes was dedicated to Henry Paget, 1st Marquess of Anglesey, and the west window showing Jesus and the Twelve Apostles dedicated to Sir Robert Waller Otway, 1st Baronet, both in 1876. The windows on the north and south sides were also replaced in 1900 and 1906 respectively.

The churchyard contains five Commonwealth war graves, of two Royal Welsh Fusiliers soldiers and a Merchant sailor of World War I, and a Merchant and a Royal Navy sailor of World War II.

=== Listing ===
In 1998, St Mary's Church was granted Grade II-listed status, as "a good example of a small Gothic Revival Church, characterized by its use of clearly articulated architectural forms and a controlled, coherent vocabulary of detail".

== Village name ==
The village of Llanfairpwllgwyngyll is named after St Mary's Church. The long form of this name, Llanfairpwllgwyngyllgogerychwyrndrobwllllantysiliogogogoch, was first adopted in the 19th century as a promotional device. In English, the first and older element of the name means "The Church of St Mary at Pwllgwyngyll [the white hazel pool]". The second part translates as "near the rapid whirlpool, near St Tysilio's red cave", Llandysilio being the name of another local parish.
