= St Mary's Church, Menai Bridge =

Church in Menai Bridge, Anglesey, Wales

Coordinates: 53.2234°N 4.1654°W

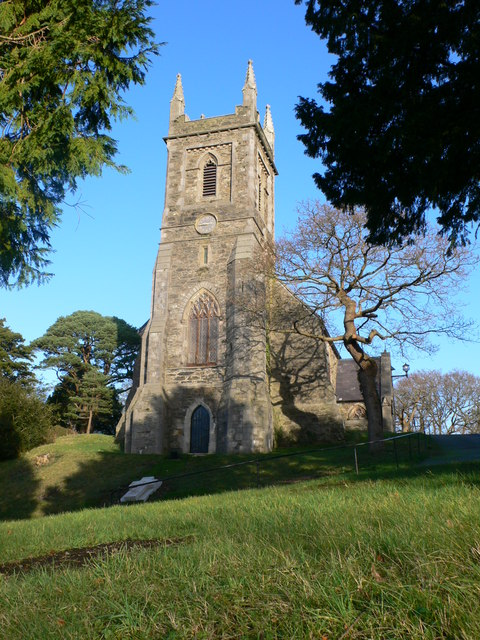
St Mary's Church

St Mary's Church is a Grade II listed church in Menai Bridge, Anglesey serving the parish of Bro Tysilio, in the Diocese of St Davids of the Church in Wales.

The church was designed by Henry Kennedy in the Decorated Style to replace the old church at Llandysilio. Build of random rubble with sandstone dressings, it was completed in 1858. Stained glass windows were added by Mayer in 1869 and Shrigley and Hunt in 1876. The sanctuary is raised with a granite reredos of three bays across the east wall, added in 1885. The granite font of the church, dated to 1900, is octagonal in shape, and features floriate carving work.
