= Maelog =

6th-century pre-congregational saint of Wales

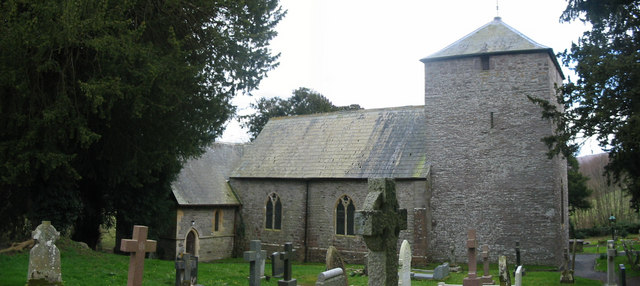
Meilog's church, Llanfaelog.

Maelog was a 6th-century pre-congregational saint of Wales and a child of King Caw of Strathclyde.

He was the patron Saint of Llanfaelog, where he built his church.
