= Bodewryd =

Village in Anglesey, Wales

Coordinates: 53.38°N 04.42°W

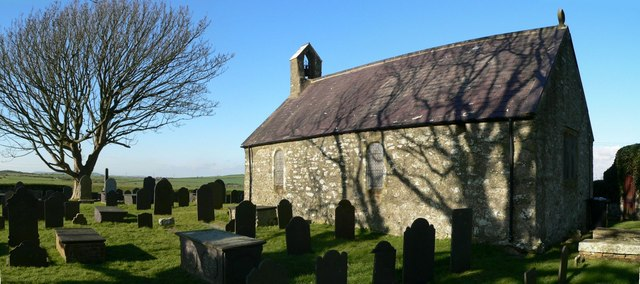
- St. Mary's Church

- Location within Anglesey
- OS grid reference: SH3990
- Principal area: Anglesey
- Country: Wales
- Sovereign state: United Kingdom
- Police: North Wales
- Fire: North Wales
- Ambulance: Welsh
- UK Parliament: Ynys Môn
- Senedd Cymru – Welsh Parliament: Bangor Conwy Môn

Bodewryd (Welsh: [bod'ɛrʊi̯d]; Welsh pronunciation) is a village in Anglesey, Wales, in the community of Mechell.

== St Mary's Church ==
The village church is St Mary's, Bodewryd, a small medieval church. It is said by the Diocese of Bangor to be the second-smallest church in Anglesey. The date of construction is unknown, but there was a church on this site in 1254 and the earliest feature to which a date can be given is a doorway, said to be from the 15th century or perhaps about 1500. When the church was restored in 1867 after being struck by lightning, stained glass with Islamic-influenced patterns was included in the windows, a requirement of Lord Stanley of Alderley, the church's benefactor, who was a convert to Islam. The church is still in use, as part of the Church in Wales, and is one of five churches in a combined parish. It is a Grade II listed building, a designation given to "buildings of special interest, which warrant every effort being made to preserve them", in particular because it is a "simple, rural church of Medieval origins."
