= Harry Longueville Jones =

Welsh archaeologist (1806–1870)

Rev. Harry Longueville Jones
- Born: 1806; Piccadilly, London
- Died: 16 November 1870 (aged 63–64); Kensington, London
- Education: St John's College, Cambridge and Magdalene College, Cambridge
- Known for: Editor, Archaeologia Cambrensis
- Scientific career
- Fields: Archaeology; Medieval architecture, History of Wales and artist
- Workplaces: Inspector of Schools for Wales

Harry Longueville Jones (1806–1870) was a Welsh archæologist, artist, Inspector of Schools for Wales and leading founding member of the Cambrian Archaeological Association.

== Ancestry and early life ==
Harry Longueville Jones was the great-grandson of Sir Thomas Longueville who died in 1759. The Longuevilles, who came from Wolverton in Buckinghamshire, traced their ancestry back to the Plantagenets. Sir Thomas Longueville had married a Conway of Bodrhyddan Hall and he had come to live at Echlusham Hall Wrexham. His daughter Maria Margretta, the sole heiress of the Longueville estates married Captain Thomas Jones of the Court, Wrexham. After his marriage he changed his name to Thomas Longueville-Jones. Longueville-Jones was killed in a duel in 1799 and buried in Wrexham Church. Their son Edward married a Charlotte Elizabeth Stevens, and their son Harry Longueville Jones was born in Piccadilly, London, in 1806. He was educated at a private school at Ealing. He had close connections with other branches of Longueville and Jones families of Penyllan and Llanforda Hall near Oswestry and also Prestatyn in Flintshire. He was also distantly related to the Glynne and Gladstone families, contacts which were to prove useful to him in later life.

== Education and publications ==
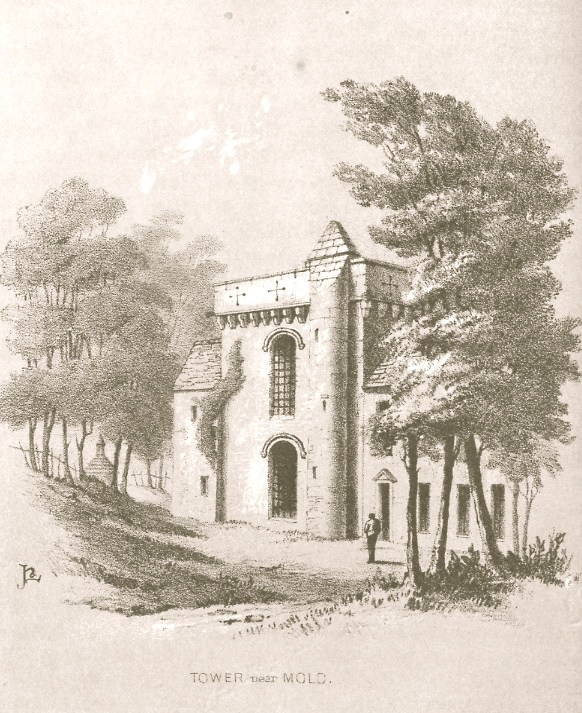
Soft ground etching by Longueville Jones of Tower, near Mold. Archaeolgia Cambrensis, 1846

From the school at Ealing, he proceeded to St. John's College, Cambridge, but subsequently migrated to Magdalene College, where he graduated B.A. in 1828 (being 31st Wrangler) and M.A. in 1832. He was elected fellow of his college, and held the offices of lecturer and dean, took holy orders in 1829, and for a short period was curate of Connington, near Peterborough in the diocese of Ely, but did not seek any further clerical preferment. In 1832 he relinquished his fellowship at Magdalene College on his marriage in 1834 to Frances, second daughter of Robert Plowden Weston probably of Wellington, Shropshire.

He was developing his interests in Welsh topography and his talents as an artist while still an undergraduate at Cambridge. In 1829, the year after he graduated, he had published "Illustrations of the Natural Scenery of the Snowdonian Mountains: Accompanied by a Description, Topographical and Historical of the County of Caernarvon" This is a very scarce folio or elephant folio volume, published by Charles Tilt, with text and fifteen large lithograph prints of Snowdonia. A later publishing venture in 1841, also produced by Charles Tilt (now Tilt and Bogue Publishers) was when Jones together with Thomas Wright published the impressive and detailed two volume Memorials of Cambridge, with Historical and Descriptive Accounts. He and Wright prepared the text and he may have submitted some of the illustrations, but the views of the Cambridge Colleges were taken from a number of sources and engraved by John Le Keux.

== Working as journalist in Paris 1834–1842 ==
On his resigning his fellowship at Magdalene College, he left Cambridge and started working for the Paris publisher Galignanis. The reasons for his doing this have never been fully explained. It has been suggested that his mother's ancestry was partly French and he notes that both his mother and a nephew were buried at Versailles. It is possible that he had literary aspirations and he certainly moved in literary circles in Paris. The novelist William Thackeray also worked at Galignanis, and he refers to Longueville Jones several times in his diaries as a highly convivial companion, 'an excellent, worthy and accomplished fellow', particularly gifted in art and pencil drawing'. It was however the French novelist Prosper Mérimée who was to make the greatest impact on Longueville Jones. In 1834 Mérimée had been appointed the first "Inspecteur général des Monuments historiques". As a result of this connection with Mérimée, Longueville Jones was made a Corresponding Member of the French "Comité historiques des arts et monuments", The volume of essays he published shortly before his death in 1870, were originally published in the Edinburgh Review and Blackwood's Magazine. These essays included a discussion of contemporary French "Gothic" domestic architecture comparing it to trends in England; contemporary art in France, Belgium and Switzerland and the contribution of French Benedictine philosophical and historical writers. Galignanis was an English language publishing house, which had a long list of English novelists including Sir Walter Scott, and was the publisher for the "Messenger", which later became the International New York Herald Tribune.

== Return to England and the proposed University College at Manchester ==
While in living in Paris Longueville Jones appears to have returned to England fairly frequently. In particular he read five papers to the Manchester Statistical Society, who were keen to promote a University College in Manchester that would be part of the University of London. He published this initially in 1836 as "Plan of a University for the town of Manchester". The suggestion was not acted upon, but on Jones's return from France he started a college of his own in Manchester; this, however, met with little success, and was shortly afterwards abandoned, though it prepared the way for the establishment of Owen's College in 1851. By 1845 Longueville-Jones had moved to Beaumaris and imbued with the ideas of Prosper Mérimée he had started his survey of the antiquities of the Isle of Anglesey. Initially, he was to contribute three papers too the newly formed British Archaeological Association (later Royal Archaeological Institute). These were entitled "Medieval Antiquites of Anglesey"; "Remarks on some of the churches of Anglesey" and on the "Cromlechs". He was also to submit two papers on the "Medieval Ecclesiastical Architecture of Paris", based on his work in revising Galignani's Paris Guide. Longueville Jones had hoped that the British Archaeological Association would form a separate Welsh section, but the Association was not agreeable to this.

It was also in this period that he became involved in the successful campaign, led between 1843 and 1847 by the scholarly Edward Herbert, 2nd Earl of Powis Earl of Powis, to a proposal to unite the sees of Bishop of Bangor and St Asaph. This was intended to provide funding for a new Diocese of Manchester. It was in the course of this campaign that Longueville Jones met the Rev. John Williams (Ab Ithel) and realising their kindred interests in Welsh history, literature and antiquity, led to their production, in January 1846, of the first number of the periodical which they entitled Archaeologia Cambrensis. The publication led to the expression of a desire for the establishment of an association to study Welsh archaeology. Longueville-Jones accordingly organised a meeting at Aberystwith in September 1847, and the Cambrian Archæological Association was then founded. He resigned as editor in 1849 on his appointment as Inspector for National Schools in Wales. Jones resumed as editor of "Archaeologia Cambrensis" in 1855 and continued until his death in 1875. It contains many articles by him, and many engravings of his drawings, particularly of cromlechs, inscribed stones and churches.

== Appointment as Inspector for National Schools in Wales ==
In 1849 Jones was appointed Inspector for schools in Wales in the Privy Council Office. His work was lessened subsequently by the appointment, first of an assistant and then of a separate inspector. Ill-health compelled his retirement about 1864. After some years' residence in Brighton he settled in Kensington, London, where he died 16 November 1870.

== Works ==
- Illustrations of the Natural Scenery of the Snowdonian Mountains, accompanied by a description of the County of Carnarvon, London, 1829.
- Plan of a University for the town of Manchester, 58 pp., Manchester, 1836.
- Memorials of Cambridge, with Historical and Descriptive Accounts, 2 vols., 1841. This was written by him and Thomas Wright, and published by the engraver John Le Keux.
- Essays and papers on literary and historical subjects, reprinted from Blackwood's Magazine and other periodicals, London, 1870.

== Literature ==
- Edwards Nancy and Gould John, "From Antiquarianisn to Archaeologists in nineteenth century Wales: The Question of Prehistory" pp143–164, in Evans N and Pryce H (eds), Writing a Small Nation's Past: Wales in Comparative Perspective,1850–1950. Ashgate (2013) ISBN 978-1-4094-5062-7
- Williams, H. G., "Longueville Jones and Welsh Education: The neglected case of a Victorian H.M.I." Welsh History Review, Vol 15, no.3, (June 1991), pp 416–442.

== Engravings and Soft Ground Etchings by Harry Longueville Jones ==
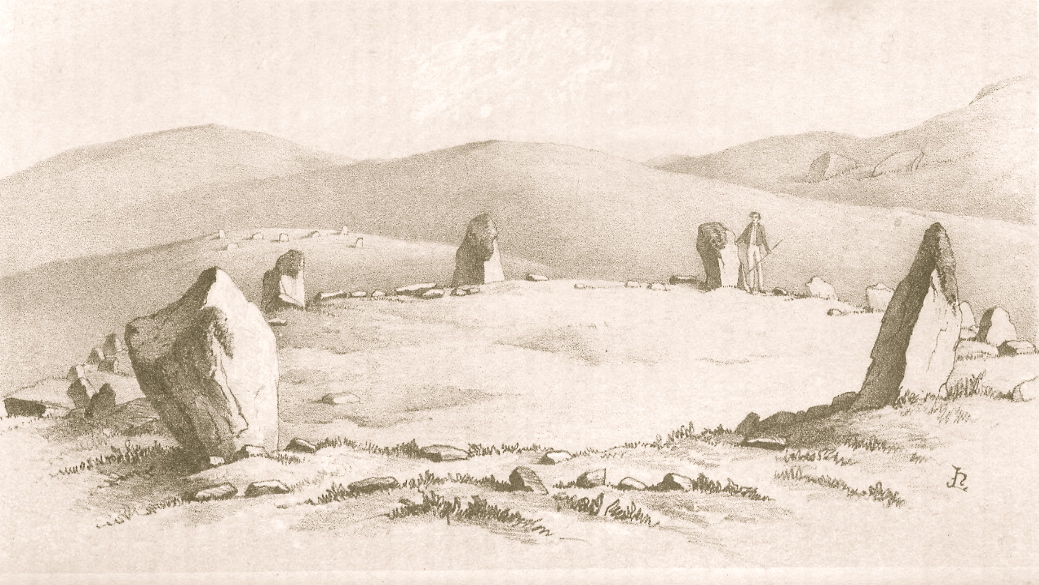
Dwygyfylchi Stone Circle Conway, from Arch Camb 1846

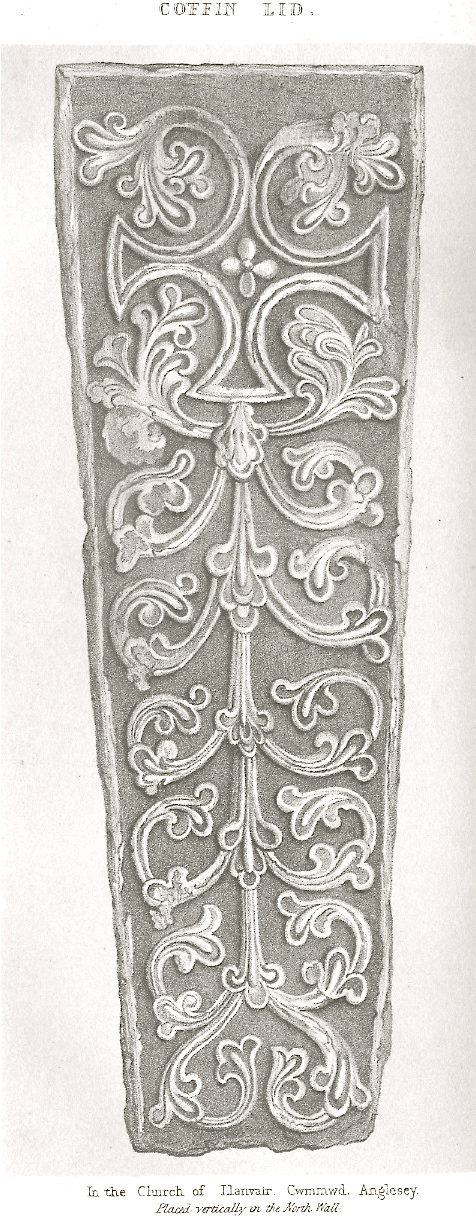
Coffin Lid, Llanfair Cwmmwd, Anglesey. Drawn by Harry Longueville Jones, Arch Camb, 1846 pg 394
