= Nidan =

Welsh priest in the 6th and 7th centuries

- Born: 6th century
- Died: 7th century (possibly 610)
- Venerated in: Church in Wales, Roman Catholic Church
- Major shrine: Relics reputedly at St Nidan's Church, Llanidan
- Feast: 30 September (Wales); 3 November (Scotland)
- Patronage: In Wales: two churches in Anglesey; In Scotland: one church in Aberdeenshire

Nidan (sometimes known as Midan or Idan) was a Welsh priest and, according to some sources, a bishop, in the 6th and 7th centuries. He is now commemorated as a saint. He was the confessor for the monastery headed by St Seiriol at Penmon, and established a church at what is now known as Llanidan, which are both places on the Welsh island of Anglesey. He is the patron saint of two churches in Anglesey: St Nidan's Church, Llanidan, built in the 19th century, and its medieval predecessor, the Old Church of St Nidan, Llanidan. Midmar Old Kirk in Aberdeenshire, Scotland, is also dedicated to him: Nidan is said to have helped to establish Christianity in that area as a companion of St Kentigern. St Nidan's, Llanidan, has a reliquary dating from the 14th or 16th century, which is said to house his relics.

== Life ==
Little is known in detail about Nidan's life, and his year and place of birth are unknown. He is sometimes referred to as "Midan" or "Idan". According to manuscript sources, such as Peniarth MS 45 (which has been dated to the 14th century) in the National Library of Wales, he was the son of Gwrfyw ab Pasgen ab Urien Rheged. He was a descendant of Urien Rheged, as was Saint Grwst of Llanrwst, a town on the north Wales mainland in present-day Conwy County Borough. Urien was a "celebrated warrior" from the late 5th century, whose deeds were commemorated by the Welsh poet Taliesin.

Nidan was associated with St Seiriol's monastery at Penmon, on the eastern tip of Anglesey in north Wales, and was the monastery's confessor. He is also referred to as a bishop in one source. He founded a church in what is now known as Llanidan, also on Anglesey, near to the Menai Straits. According to tradition, this was established in 616. He is reported to have lived at Cadair Idan, near the church, and a well about 200 yards (180 m) away from the church is reputed to be his holy well.

Nidan is said to have been one of the 665 monks who travelled with St Kentigern, also known as St Mungo, and reputed to be a cousin of his, from Llanelwy, north Wales, to Scotland. Together with another of Kentigern's companions, Finan or Ffinan, they are said to have established Christianity in Midmar, in what is now Aberdeenshire, in the 7th century. A church in Midmar was dedicated to Nidan. However, the existence of a link between Nidan and Kentigern has been doubted, with one author saying that "the whole idea that these people [i.e. Nidan and Ffinan] had any connection with Kentigern is without any real foundation."

According to some sources, he died in about 610, which would be inconsistent with the reported foundation date for the church at Llanidan of 616.

== Commemoration ==
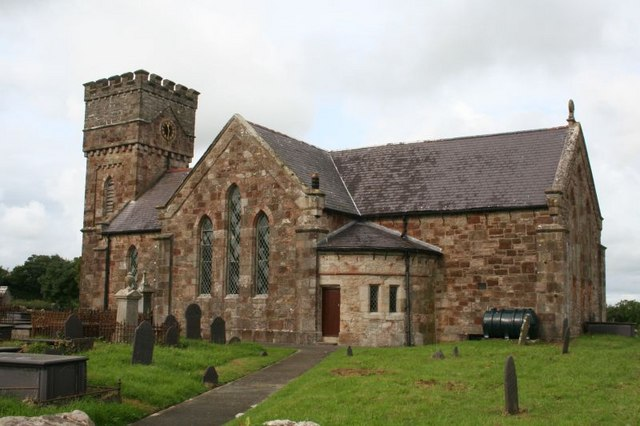
St Nidan's Church, Llanidan

The Old Church of St Nidan, Llanidan, was in use until the middle of the 19th century when it was replaced by St Nidan's Church, Llanidan, nearer to the village of Brynsiencyn. This was for two reasons: the old church needed repair, and also because the population of Brynsiencyn needed a church. The old church was then partially demolished. The new church contains a sandstone reliquary, about 26 inches (66 cm) long, which is said to contain Nidan's relics. The reliquary's date is uncertain: it has been described as being "probably" from the 14th century, but also, in a more recent description, as "probably 16th century". It was found buried under the altar of the old church in 1700.

His feast day in the Welsh calendar of saints is 30 September; in the Scottish calendar of saints, it is 3 November. Nidan was venerated as a saint, although he was never canonized by a pope: as the historian Jane Cartwright notes, "In Wales sanctity was locally conferred and none of the medieval Welsh saints appears to have been canonized by the Roman Catholic Church".

== See also ==
Other Anglesey saints commemorated at local churches include:

- Caffo at St Caffo's Church, Llangaffo
- Cwyllog at St Cwyllog's Church, Llangwyllog
- Eleth at St Eleth's Church, Amlwch
- Iestyn at St Iestyn's Church, Llaniestyn
- Peulan at St Peulan's Church, Llanbeulan
- Tyfrydog at St Tyfrydog's Church, Llandyfrydog
