= Cynfarwy =

Christian in the 7th century

Cynfarwy was a Christian in the 7th century about whom little is known. He was venerated by the early church in Wales as a saint, although he was never formally canonised. St Cynfarwy's Church in Anglesey is dedicated to him, and his name is also preserved in the name of the settlement around the church, Llechgynfarwy (or sometimes "Llechcynfarwy"). His feast day is in November, although the date varies between sources.

== Life and commemoration ==
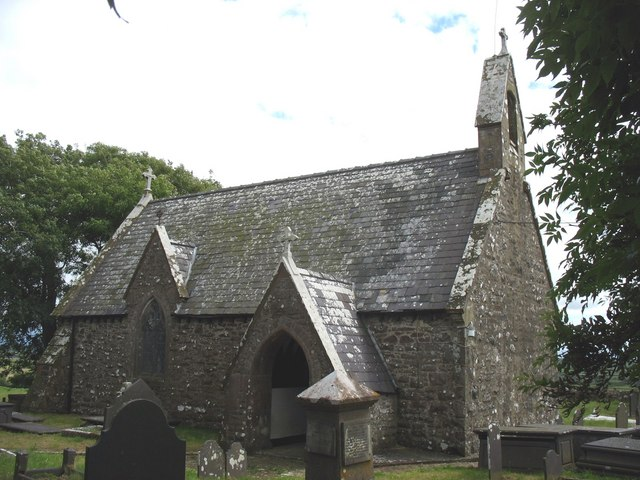
St Cynfarwy's Church, Llechgynfarwy

Little is known for certain about Cynfarwy; his dates of birth and death are not given in the Bonedd y Saint (a Welsh genealogical tract compiled in the late 18th century using material from older manuscripts). According to the 19th-century Celtic scholar Robert Williams, Cynfarwy was active in the 7th century. According to the Bonedd y Saint, he was the son of the otherwise unknown "Awy ab Llehenog, Lord of Cornwall".

Cynfarwy is venerated as a saint, although he was never canonized by a pope: as the historian Jane Cartwright notes, "In Wales sanctity was locally conferred and none of the medieval Welsh saints appears to have been canonized by the Roman Catholic Church".

== Church and feast day ==
Cynfarwy is the patron saint of St Cynfarwy's Church, Llechgynfarwy in Anglesey, north Wales. According to the 19th-century Welsh historian Angharad Llwyd, he established the first church there in about 630. The present church (which is a Grade II listed building) mainly dates from the 19th century, but has some medieval fabric and a 12th-century font.

Until the 19th century, there was a stone more than 9 feet (3 m) high in the field next to church, known Maen Llechgynfarwy (maen meaning "stone", llech meaning "slate" and "-gynfarwy" being a modified form of the saint's name). The settlement around the church, which is about 10 miles (16 km) from the port of Holyhead, is known as Llechgynfarwy (or sometimes as "Llechcynfarwy").

The traditional date for the feast of St Cynfarwy varies between antiquarian sources, although all place it in November. Some manuscripts say that it falls on the 10th, some on the 11th, whilst according to Angharad Llwyd and others the festival is marked on the 7th.

== See also ==
Other Anglesey saints commemorated in local churches include:

- St Caffo at St Caffo's Church, Llangaffo
- St Cwyllog at St Cwyllog's Church, Llangwyllog
- St Eleth at St Eleth's Church, Amlwch
- St Iestyn at St Iestyn's Church, Llaniestyn
- St Peulan at St Peulan's Church, Llanbeulan
- St Tyfrydog at St Tyfrydog's Church, Llandyfrydog
