= Caffo =

Welsh saint

Caffo was a sixth-century Christian in Anglesey, north Wales, who is venerated as a saint and martyr. The son of a king from northern Britain who took shelter in Anglesey, Caffo was a companion of St Cybi, and is mentioned as carrying a red-hot coal in his clothes to Cybi without his clothes getting burnt. After leaving Cybi, Caffo was killed by shepherds in the south of Anglesey, possibly acting in retaliation for insults Caffo's brother had paid to the local ruler. The area where he died has a village, Llangaffo, named after him, as well as the parish church of St Caffo, Llangaffo.

== Life and martyrdom ==
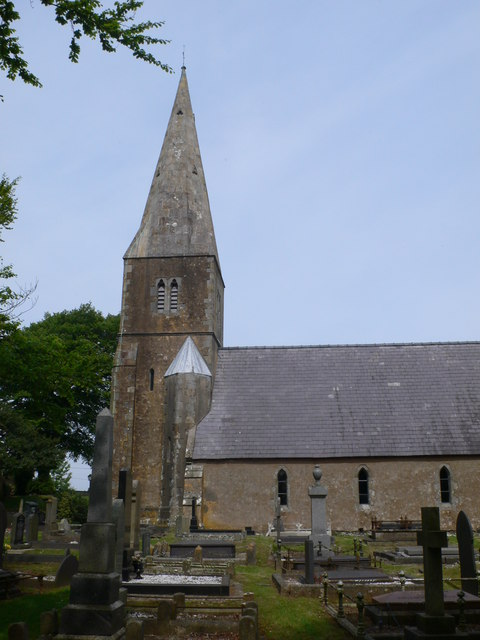
St Caffo's Church is located not far from his place of death near Llangaffo.

Little is known for certain about Caffo; his dates of birth and death are not given in the sources. He is said to have been one of the sons of St Caw, a king in northern Britain who lost his lands and sought safety with his family in Anglesey; the ruler Maelgwn Gwynedd gave him land in the north-east of the island, in the district known as Twrcelyn. Other relatives of Caffo included his uncles St Iestyn and St Cyngar (brothers of Caw), his sister St Cwyllog and various brothers including St Gildas (although the number of his siblings varies from 10 to 21 in different manuscripts).

Caffo was a companion and cousin of St Cybi, a Christian from Cornwall who was active in the mid-6th century. Cybi established himself in Anglesey within a disused Roman fort in what is now called Holyhead: the town's Welsh name is Caergybi, or "Cybi's fort"). Caffo is mentioned in connection with Cybi in a manuscript written in about 1200, which contains two accounts of Cybi's life. Caffo is not mentioned in the accounts of Cybi's life until an incident when he was sent to fetch fire from a blacksmith. He returned to Cybi carrying a red-hot coal in his clothes, which were not burnt.

At some point, Cybi and Caffo parted company, possibly because of a disagreement between them, but possibly because his brother Gildas had insulted Maelgwn, who then forced Cybi to dismiss Caffo – both versions appear in the manuscript accounts. Thereafter, Caffo moved towards the south of Anglesey, where he was killed by shepherds from the area now called Newborough, perhaps avenging the insult on their king.

== Commemoration ==
The area of Caffo's death became known at some point as Llangaffo, and a church was established there: the Welsh word "llan" originally meant "enclosure" and then "church", and "-gaffo" is a modified form of the saint's name. It is thought that there may have at one point been a monastery in this location, known as "Merthyr Caffo" (Merthyr being the Welsh word for "martyr"). Caffo is venerated as a saint, although he was never canonized by a pope: as the historian Jane Cartwright notes, "In Wales sanctity was locally conferred and none of the medieval Welsh saints appears to have been canonized by the Roman Catholic Church".

It is uncertain when the name "Llangaffo" was first used or when the first church was established here, but it was before 1254, when the church and community were recorded in the Norwich Taxation (a national survey of church names and property). There is still a church dedicated to Caffo in the village, used for worship by the Church in Wales.

Caffo is reported to have had a bubbling "holy well" in the area, called Crochan Caffo ("Caffo's cauldron") or Ffynnon Caffo ("Caffo's well"). Parents would offer fowls to be eaten by the attendant priest, in order to stop their children from peevishness. A nearby farm is still named after the well, although the well itself has been lost.

== See also ==
Other Anglesey saints commemorated in local churches include:

- St Cwyllog at St Cwyllog's Church, Llangwyllog
- St Eleth at St Eleth's Church, Amlwch
- St Iestyn at St Iestyn's Church, Llaniestyn
- St Peulan at St Peulan's Church, Llanbeulan
- St Tyfrydog at St Tyfrydog's Church, Llandyfrydog
