= Tyfrydog =

Fifth- or sixth-century Christian saint

Tyfrydog (sometimes given as Tyvrydog) was a Christian from north-west Wales in the fifth or sixth century, who was later venerated as a saint. He is said to have established a church in Anglesey, and although no part of the original structure remains, the current church is still dedicated to him. A nearby standing stone is said to be the remains of a man who he punished for stealing a bible from the church.

== Life and family ==
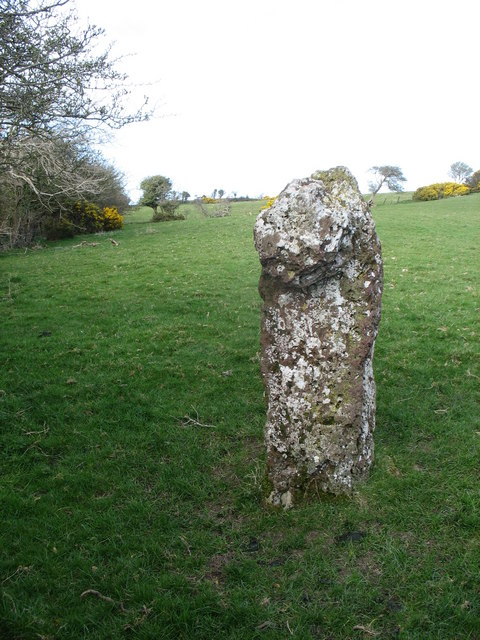
The remains of a man turned to stone by St Tyfrydog for stealing a bible, according to legend

Little is known for certain about Tyfrydog's life, and his dates of birth and death are unknown. He is said to have lived towards the end of the sixth century, although another account has him as active during the middle of the fifth century. His father is recorded as being Arwystli Glof ab Seithenyn, active in the middle of the sixth century. Both he and his father are said to have been part of the Christian community on Bardsey Island, at the tip of the Llŷn Peninsula in north-west Wales. Some of his siblings are also venerated as saints. Twrnog is commemorated at the church in Llandyrnog, Denbighshire, in north-east Wales, while his brother Tudur (or Tudyr) was recorded as a saint from Darowen, Powys, in west Wales. His sister, Marchell, is reported to have established Ystrad Marchell, near Welshpool in mid-Wales, where an abbey (Strata Marcella) was later built.

== Commemoration ==
Tyfrydog is the patron saint and the reputed founder of St Tyfrydog's Church, Llandyfrydog, a small village in Anglesey, north Wales. The tradition is that he established the church in about 450. No part of a building from that period survives; the earliest parts of the present structure date from about 1400. Llandyfrydog takes its name from the church and the saint: the Welsh word llan originally meant "enclosure" and then "church", and "-dyfrydog" is a modified form of his name.

He is venerated as a saint, although he was never canonized by a pope: as the historian Jane Cartwright notes, "In Wales sanctity was locally conferred and none of the medieval Welsh saints appears to have been canonized by the Roman Catholic Church". The feast day of St Tyfrydog is 1 January.

About 1 mile (1.6 km) from the church, there is a field with an upright stone about 4 feet (1.2 m) high. The stone is known as "the thief of Dyfrydog". It is said to be a man turned into stone by St Tyfyrdog for stealing the church's bible; the lump near the top of the stone is said to be the sack on the man's shoulder. It is also said that the man's soul is periodically chased around the field during the night, chased by "demons with red-hot pitchforks."

== See also ==
Other Anglesey saints commemorated in local churches include:

- St Caffo at St Caffo's Church, Llangaffo
- St Cwyllog at St Cwyllog's Church, Llangwyllog
- St Eleth at St Eleth's Church, Amlwch
- St Iestyn at St Iestyn's Church, Llaniestyn
- St Peulan at St Peulan's Church, Llanbeulan
