= Old Church of St Nidan, Llanidan =

Medieval church in Anglesey, Wales

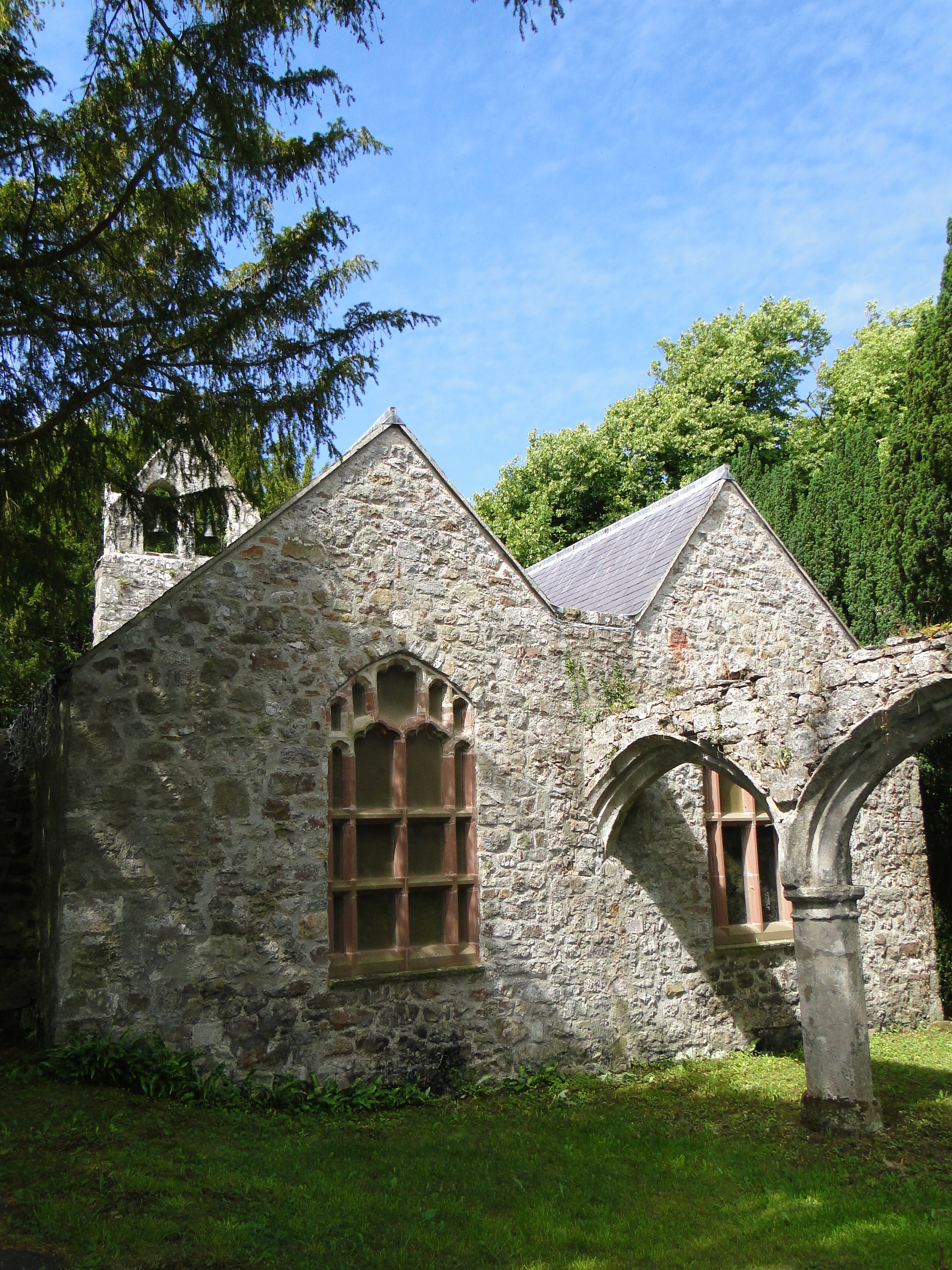
- The surviving western section of St Nidan's and the central arcade

- Location in Anglesey Location in Wales
- 53°10′40″N 4°15′13″W
- Location: Llanidan, Anglesey
- Country: Wales
- Denomination: Church in Wales

History
- Status: Church
- Founded: 616
- Founder: St Nidan
- Dedication: St Nidan

Architecture
- Functional status: Closed and partly demolished in the 19th century; occasionally open to the public
- Heritage designation: Grade II*
- Designated: 30 January 1968
- Style: Medieval

Specifications
- Length: 78 ft (24 m) (pre-demolition)
- Width: 38 ft (12 m)
- Materials: Rubble masonry dressed with sandstone

The Old Church of St Nidan, Llanidan is a medieval church in the community of Llanidan, in Anglesey, North Wales, close to the Menai Strait. The first church on the site was established in the 7th century by St Nidan, the confessor of the monastery at Penmon, Anglesey, but the oldest parts of the present structure, now closed and partly ruined, date from the 14th century. In about 1500 the church was enlarged by the addition of a second nave on the north side, separated from the earlier nave by an arcade of six arches. During 1839 till 1843 a new church was built nearby to serve the local community, partly due to the cost of repairing the old church. Much of the building was subsequently demolished, leaving only part of the western end and the central arcade. The decision was condemned at the time by Harry Longueville Jones, a clergyman and antiquarian, who lamented the "melancholy fate" of what he called "one of the largest and most important [churches] in the island of Anglesey". Other appreciative comments have been made about the church both before and after its partial demolition.

After that a new church was opened, the old church was used as a chapel for funerals for a period of time. It has been restored by the owners of the adjoining house, Plas Llanidan, and is occasionally open to the public. The remaining parts of the church are a Grade II* listed building, a national designation given to "particularly important buildings of more than special interest", in particular because St Nidan's is regarded as "a good example of a simple medieval rural church, enriched by 15th-century additions".

In the 12th century, Gerald of Wales said that the church possessed a curious stone carving similar to a thigh that would always return by the next day no matter how far away it was taken. A Norman earl, he recounted, had chained it to a large rock and thrown it into the sea, only for the stone to return to the church by the following morning. A sandstone chest containing bone fragments, possibly are relics of a saint, were found buried beneath the altar. The chest and the church's 13th-century font were relocated to the new church.

== History and location ==
=== Foundation and construction ===
St Nidan's Church is in the south of Anglesey, Wales, near the village of Brynsiencyn. It is about a quarter of a mile (400 m) from the Menai Strait, which divides the mainland of Wales from the island of Anglesey. The authors of a 2009 guide to the buildings of north-west Wales record the tradition that a church was first established at this site in 616. St Nidan, who founded the church, was associated with St Seiriol's monastery at Penmon, on the eastern tip of Anglesey, and was the monastery's confessor. The area takes its name from the church: the Welsh word llan originally meant "enclosure" and then "church", and "‑idan" is a modified form of the saint's name.

The church and rectory are mentioned in a charter of 1360 as being owned by the priory at Beddgelert, Gwynedd; earlier records have been lost and therefore the date of the priory's acquisition is unknown. As a result, writes the historian Antony Carr, the reason for the "distant community" of Augustinians in Beddgelert possessing Llanidan and three other churches in Anglesey cannot now be discovered. Carr notes that the priory also controlled two churches on the other side of the Menai Strait from Llanidan. Ownership of the church was passed down to Henry VIII at the dissolution of the monasteries in 1535. His successor, Elizabeth I, granted the advowson (the right of a patron to choose the parish priest) and the grounds surrounding St Nidan's, including the estate house called Plas Llanidan, to an Edward Downam and a Peter Ashton; thereafter, in the following centuries, the right and the land passed on through sale, on marriage and by bequest into the hands of the Boston family.

The remaining part of the south nave, the oldest section of the present structure, dates from medieval times; the north doorway and tracery (patterns of stonework in the windows) point to the 14th century. In about 1500, the church was enlarged by the addition of a south porch and a second nave to the north. An arcade (row of arches) was constructed between the two naves. Enlargement by adding a second nave was not as common in Anglesey as elsewhere in Wales. Llanidan is one of three examples on the island; the others are St Beuno's, Aberffraw and St Cwyfan's, Llangwyfan. It is uncertain whether St Nidan's was enlarged because of a growth in the numbers attending the church or because of the generosity of a benefactor.

=== Replacement and demolition ===
A new church, also dedicated to St Nidan, was built to replace the old one between 1839 and 1843. This was because the old church required considerable repair and the growing population in Brynsiencyn needed a church closer to their village. Much of the structure of the old church was demolished in 1844, leaving only the western end (enclosed by a new wall at the east) and the arcade. Some walling was constructed at the east end of the arcade to help support the arches, but it sank because it was apparently built over a grave. In 1913, the tops of the external arches were covered with asphalt and turf in an attempt to make them more weather-proof. One of the voussoirs in the easternmost arch was replaced at the same time due to its poor condition.

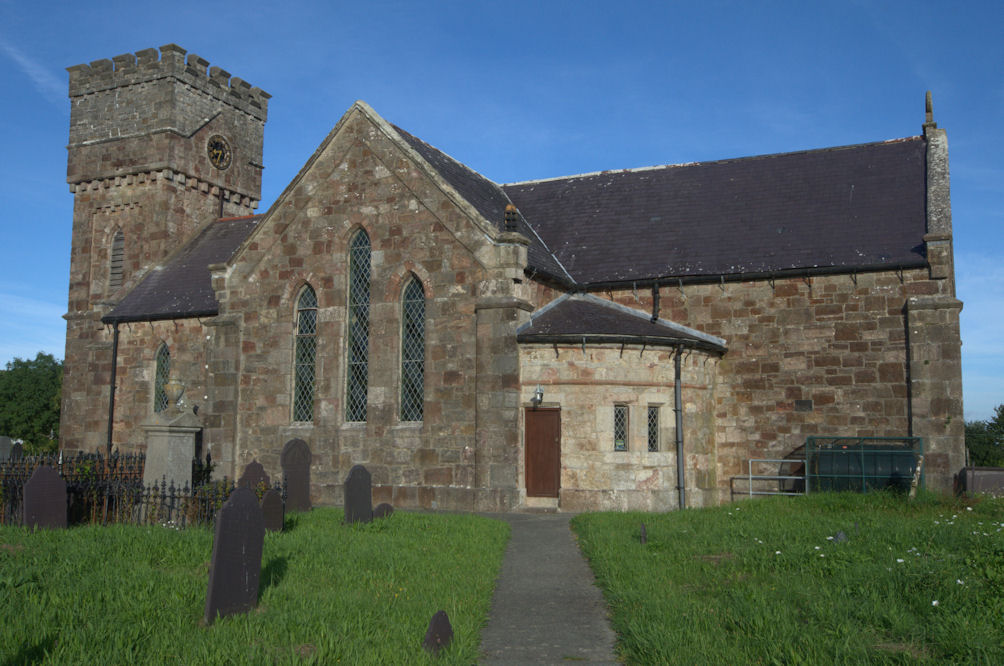
The new church, built (according to one 19th-century critic) in a "debased barbarous style"

Parish worship transferred to the new church, along with some of the fittings. The old church was thereafter used as a mortuary chapel for a time. The churchyard continued to be used for burials until 1902. In modern times, the owners of Plas Llanidan have restored the church, and it is used by them as a private chapel. The churchyard is kept locked, but the church and the gardens of Plas Llanidan are occasionally opened to the public.

The 19th-century clergyman and antiquarian Harry Longueville Jones disputed the need to replace the old church and condemned its "melancholy fate", describing the reasons for its demise as "pretexts". In his view the only part of the church that needed repair was the "ruinous" western end (which had been "badly constructed in the first instance"), yet this part was saved while the "good portions of the building" were destroyed. Furthermore, the cost of the new church was more than double the cost of repairs to the medieval church, which could have "endure[d] for ages to come". He added that it might have been thought to be safe, as it was so close to Lord Boston's house and thus "under the shadow of the lord of the domain", and he condemned the "evil hour" in which "the ruthless hand of the destroyer was allowed to be lifted against it by those whose first duty it was to see that it took no harm". He stated that "when buildings, dedicated to God's service by the piety of former ages, are allowed to be treated in this manner by the constituted authorities of the land ... the institutions to which they are attached cannot be expected to find greater favour at the hands of the fickle and ignorant multitude." He also noted that the new church was only a little larger than its predecessor.

=== People associated with the church ===
The cleric and antiquarian Henry Rowlands, who wrote a history of Anglesey entitled Mona Antiqua Restaurata, was the vicar of St Nidan's from 1696 until his death in 1723. Thomas Williams, a politician and businessman who became wealthy through copper mining in Anglesey, was buried in the churchyard in 1802, but was reburied at St Tegfan's, Llandegfan, in the 1830s. Isaac Jones, a cleric and translator of theological texts, was a curate of Llanidan and other churches in the vicinity from 1840 until his death in 1850. He is buried in the churchyard of St Nidan's. The sculptor John Gibson (1790–1866) was the son of William Gibson, the fourth of his family to serve as the parish clerk at St Nidan's. The Gibson family was associated with the church from the early 18th century onwards; the baptism of Grace, daughter of George Gibson, is recorded in the registers in 1708.

== Architecture and fittings ==
=== Structure ===
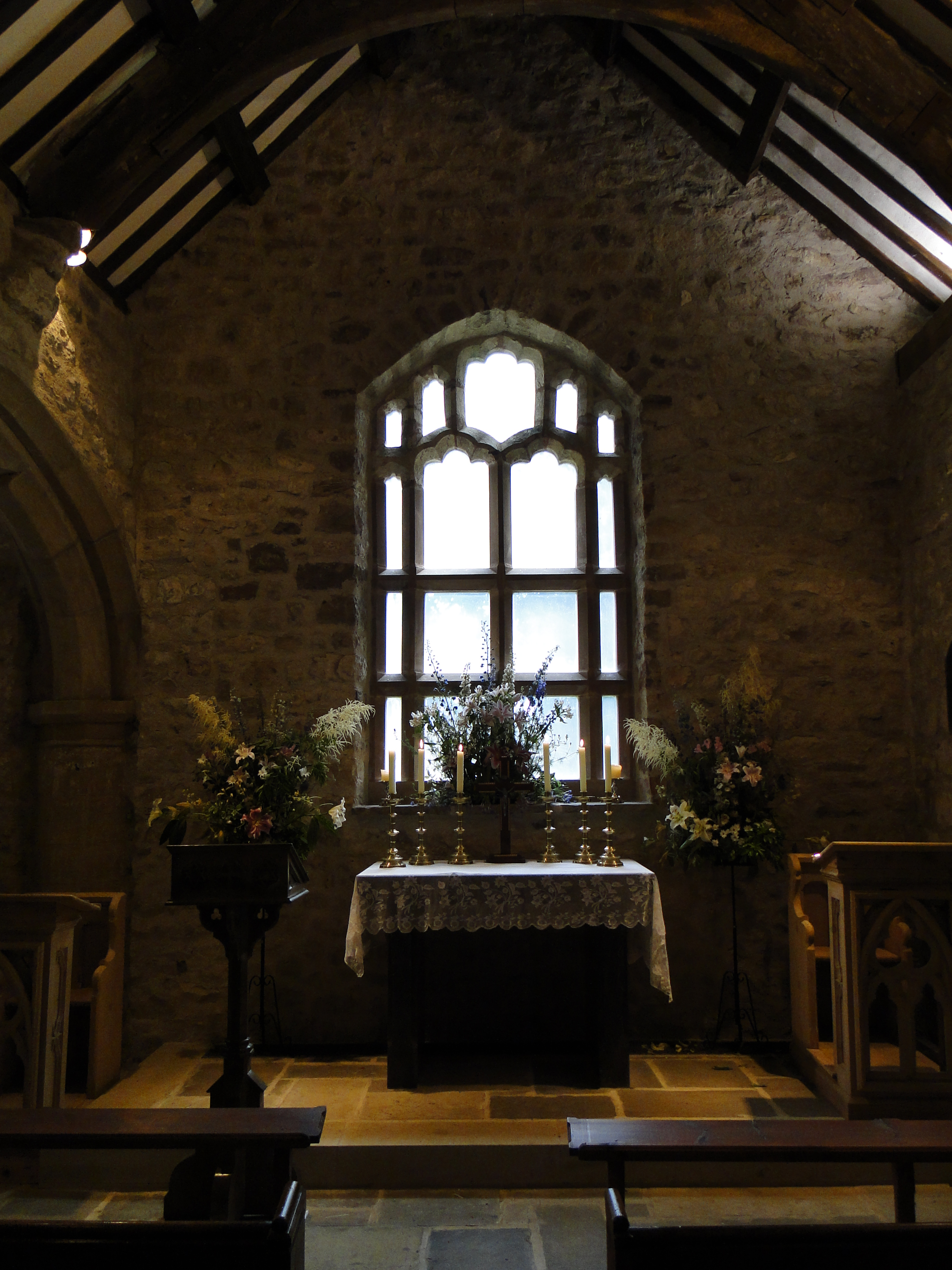
The east window of the southern aisle, which reuses some 15th-century tracery, and the exposed woodwork of the roof

St Nidan's has two naves or aisles divided by a central arcade, and a porch in the south-west corner. It is 38 feet (11.6 m) wide, the northern nave being about 3 feet (0.91 m) wider than the other. Before the church's partial demolition, the church was 78 feet (23.8 m) long and had a chapel, 12 by 19 feet (3.7 by 5.8 m), on the south side. The walls, about 2 feet 10 inches (0.86 m) thick, are built from local rubble masonry with a covering of sandstone. The present wall at the east end was added after the rest of the church was demolished. The western wall has been rebuilt and buttresses added to the south side and north-west corner to help support the structure; Jones thought that they dated from the 16th century. The roof above the remaining western section is made from slates. At the top of the west end of the roof above the south aisle, there is a stone bellcote with two bells.

The south porch contains a water stoup that was said miraculously never to dry up; the water was traditionally regarded as having healing powers. There is a second entrance on the north side through a 15th-century arched doorway decorated with carved human heads. Two verses from Psalm 84 (in Welsh) are written on the wall above the doorway: "For one day in thy Courts is better than a thousand. I had rather be a door-keeper in the house of my God than to dwell in the tents of ungodliness." These are the only surviving portions of the Biblical texts that once decorated the internal walls.

The north wall has a window with two lights (sections of window separated by mullions) topped with trefoils (a pattern of three overlapping circles). The two arched east windows, one in each aisle, are decorated with tracery; the southern window reuses some tracery from the 15th century. The demolished southern chapel had a two-light window similar to that at St Peter's, Newborough, which Jones considered to be of "very rude workmanship", and three-light square-headed windows in the east and west walls. Jones also noted the loss of the original window at the end of the northern aisle, which was from the 14th century in his view, and some windows in the north wall "of excellent workmanship". The southern aisle, he said, had had "a small circular headed window, filled up from a pointed one" at the eastern end; the east window "was of a design more remarkable for its singularity than its beauty."

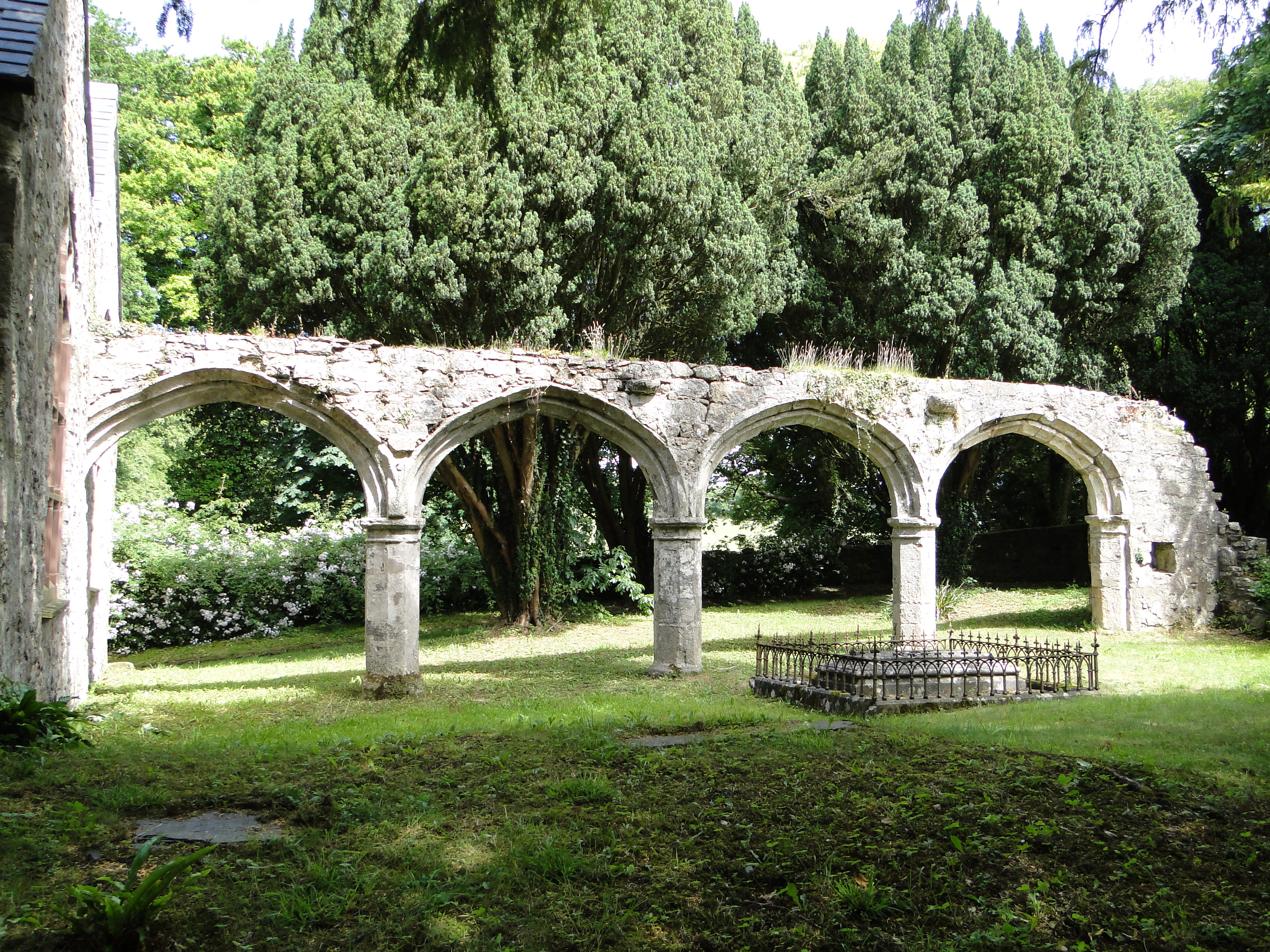
The exposed central arcade, which "rises from the graveyard like an abstract sculpture"

Two of the six arches in the arcade are inside the church; the other four project beyond the east wall, which has been built around one of the octagonal piers that support the arches. The roof dates from the 15th century, although the visible beams are not original; the roof's exposed wooden trusses rest on sandstone corbels. A 1937 survey by the Royal Commission on Ancient and Historical Monuments in Wales and Monmouthshire noted 20 memorials from the 17th and 18th centuries. It also recorded the presence of a sundial on a pedestal, dated 1768, and some stone shields that were not attached to the building, bearing dates of 1561 and 1563. Most of the fittings now in St Nidan's are not original, and come from other churches in north-west Wales; the granite altar is modern.

=== Thigh stone and reliquary ===
The 19th-century antiquarian Angharad Llwyd, who wrote a history of Anglesey in 1833, recorded the story noted by Gerald of Wales in the late 12th century that the church once possessed a stone "resembling a human thigh" which would return "of its own accord" however far away it was carried. It was sometimes known as the "homing stone". Gerald said that Hugh d'Avranches, 1st Earl of Chester (who died in 1101) had tested this story by throwing the stone into the sea, chained to a large rock, only to discover that the stone had returned by the next morning. As a result, the Norman earl issued an order that no-one was to attempt to move it. It was popularly believed that if a couple had sexual intercourse near the stone (something that Gerald said happened "frequently"), it would "sweat large drops of water" and the woman would not become pregnant. Henry Rowlands wrote that the stone had been stolen from the wall of the churchyard (into which it had been set) during his time at St Nidan's.

When Rowlands was vicar of St Nidan's, a small chest was found buried about 2 feet (60 cm) under the altar, containing some bone pieces. His view was that it contained the relics of a saint from St Nidan's or another church in the region (St Beuno's Church, Clynnog Fawr or St Dwynwen's Church, Llanddwyn), and that the chest had placed in St Nidan's during the time of Edward VI for safe keeping. The sandstone reliquary is now kept at the new church, where local tradition maintains that it holds the remains of St Nidan. Jones said that it was "unique, as far as Wales is concerned." The 13th-century font, which Jones described as "a singularly beautiful specimen", was moved to the new church in about 1860.

== Assessment ==
=== Listing ===
St Nidan's has national recognition and statutory protection from alteration as it is a Grade II* listed building, the second-highest of the three grades of listing, designating "particularly important buildings of more than special interest". It was given this status on 30 January 1968 and has been listed because it is regarded as "a good example of a simple medieval rural church, enriched by 15th-century additions." Cadw, the Welsh Government body responsible for the built heritage of Wales and the inclusion of Welsh buildings on the statutory lists, also notes that although it was partly demolished in the middle of the 19th century, "what remains can be considered a well preserved and important survival of a double-naved church, retaining many 15th-century features such as the central arcade."

The wall around the churchyard is also a listed building, at Grade II – the lowest of the three grades of listing, designating "buildings of special interest, which warrant every effort being made to preserve them". According to Cadw, the wall probably dates from the 15th century, from around the time that the church was extended.

=== Pre-demolition comments ===
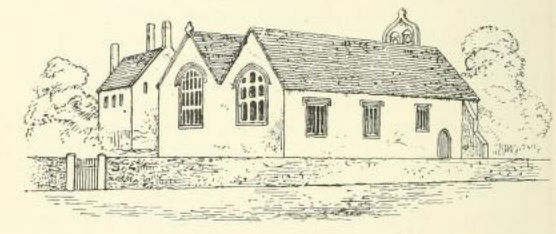
John Skinner's drawing of the church from 1802

In 1802 the clergyman and antiquarian John Skinner visited Anglesey to see the island's Celtic remains, beginning his tour by rowing across the Menai Strait to land at Llanidan. His view was that the church "seems superior to the generality of Welsh buildings of the kind", with its double roof and two bells, but he also said that "the interior of the building has little to attract notice". Angharad Llwyd described it in 1833 as "a spacious structure, containing several good monuments".

Commenting in 1846 on the church as it had been before demolition started, Harry Longueville Jones said that St Nidan's was "one of the largest and most important [churches] in the island of Anglesey" for its varied architecture, fittings and traditions. He noted the "rather curious" position of the church, in a "nearly circular enclosure" with tall trees around it, and said that "the effect of the western end with the porch, overgrown by an enormous quantity of ivy, was picturesque in the extreme".

=== Post-demolition comments ===
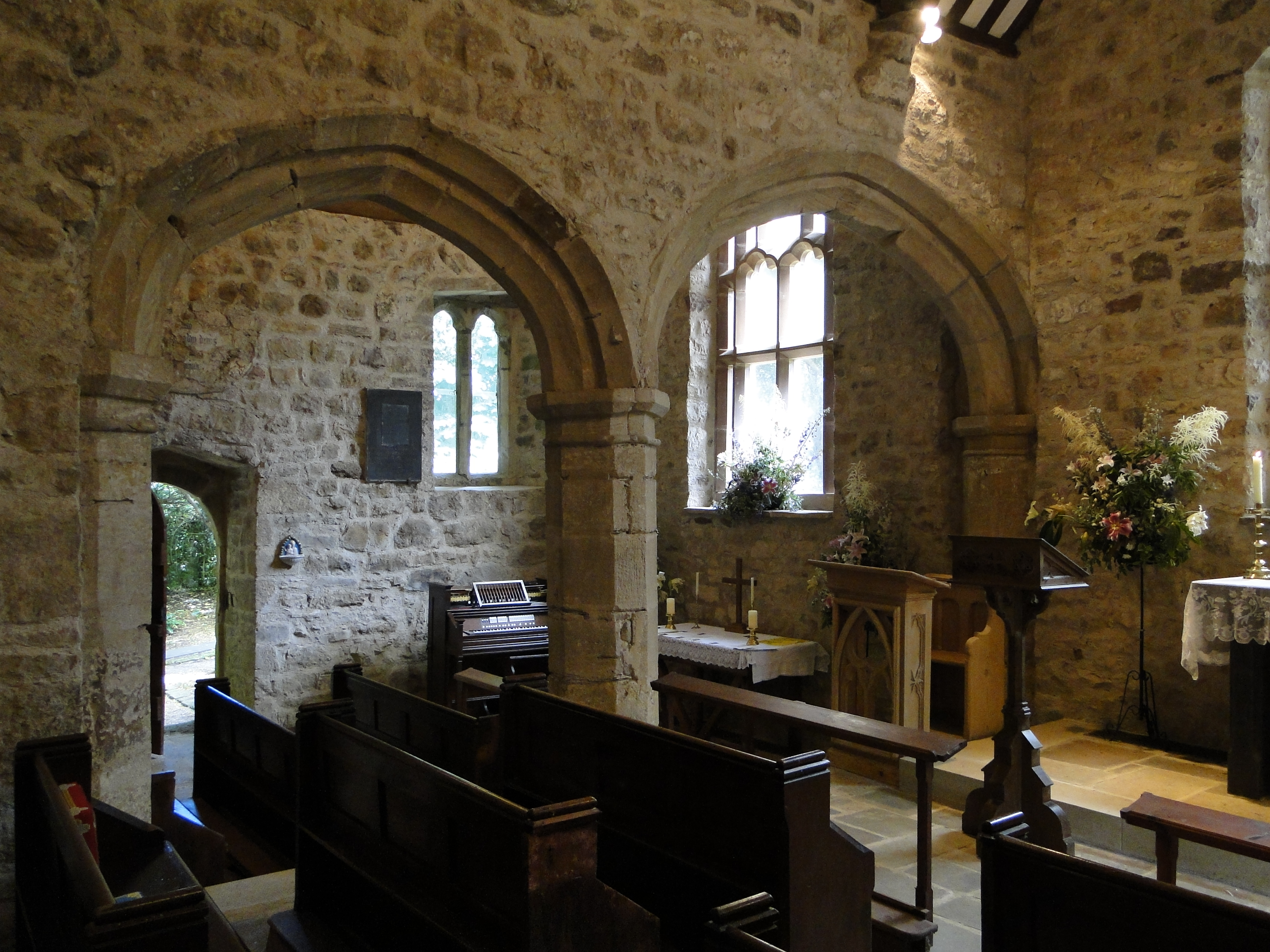
The interior, looking from the south-west corner, showing two of the arches separating the aisles

The Welsh politician and church historian Sir Stephen Glynne visited the church in 1850. He said that St Nidan's, which he described as "now abandoned and in great measure ruinated", was "a larger and better structure than most of the Anglesey churches." At the time he saw it, the walls were still largely in place but the only roofed section was the western end; he commented that most of the church was "open to the skies."

The historian and clergyman Edmund Tyrrell Green, writing a survey of Anglesey church architecture and contents in 1929, described the arcade as "good" and some of the tracery in the windows as "very good". His view was that the "excellence of the work" at St Nidan's was because of its link with Beddgelert Priory.

The authors of a 1990 book about the lost churches of Wales said that St Nidan's was "now an evocative shell decorously mantled with ivy and enclosed by an overgrown graveyard". They described it as "a dark, dusty and empty place", but said that the "elegant" arcade "rises from the graveyard like an abstract sculpture." The quality of the stone carving of the doors and windows, they said, was evidence of "the vanished splendour of Llanidan."

A 2002 book about Welsh churchyards comments that "a pilgrimage undertaken to this churchyard is rewarding", since there is "little to distract and much to suggest the quiet years of Nidan's ministry in this secluded spot." Noting how the site can be reached from the Menai Strait yet remains hidden from it, the author added that "some stillness still remains in secret places like Llanidan." A 2005 guide to Wales said that "the romantic yew-encircled ruin" of St Nidan's "should not be missed."
