= St Nidan's Church =

St Nidan's Church may refer to:

- St Nidan's Church, Llanidan, built in the mid-19th century
- Old Church of St Nidan, Llanidan, its medieval predecessor
