= Llangwyllog =

Village in Anglesey, Wales

Coordinates: 53.282357°N 4.345299°W

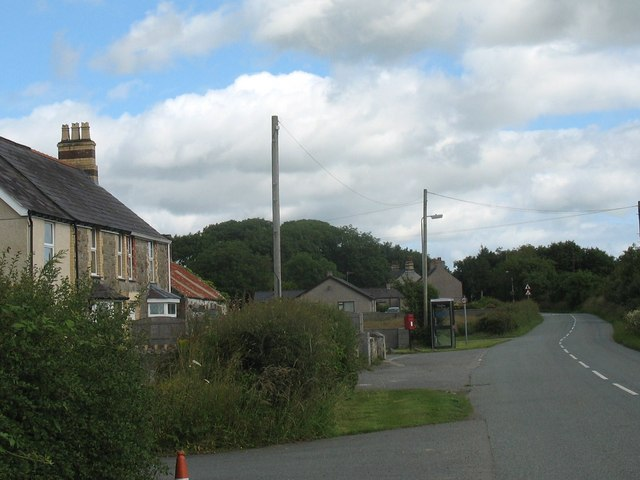

- Location within Anglesey
- Community: Llanddyfnan
- Principal area: Anglesey
- Preserved county: Gwynedd
- Country: Wales
- Sovereign state: United Kingdom
- Police: North Wales
- Fire: North Wales
- Ambulance: Welsh
- UK Parliament: Ynys Môn
- Senedd Cymru – Welsh Parliament: Bangor Conwy Môn

Llangwyllog (Welsh pronunciation) is a small village and ancient parish in the centre of Anglesey, Wales. It was also a civil parish, and remained as a community until 1984.

It is found three miles to the north of the island's capital, Llangefni, and two miles north of Llyn Cefni, the island's second largest body of water. The settlement was once far more important than it is today, reaching a population of 277 in 1821, whereas the 1971 census showed only 75 people living there.

The Anglesey Central Railway used to operate a station in the village until its closure in 1993. The tracks however still run through the village and there is a significant railway cutting in the village.

The parish church is St Cwyllog's Church, Llangwyllog; the first church here was founded by St Cwyllog in the 6th century.

One historic event said to have taken place here in 1134 was a battle between Owain Gwynedd, the first king of Wales, and the armies of the Erse, Manx and Norsemen, who had invaded the island. In the end the Welsh leader was triumphant.
