= St Iestyn's Church, Llaniestyn, Gwynedd =

Church in Gwynedd

Coordinates: 52.8735°N 4.5723°W

St Iestyn's Church, Llaniestyn
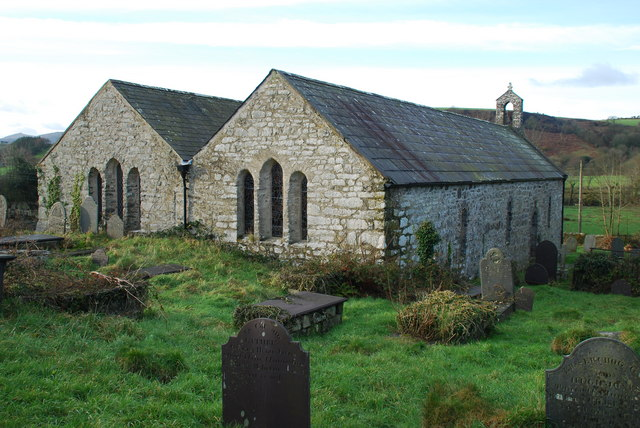

- Location in Conwy County Borough
- OS grid reference: SH 269 337
- Location: Llaniestyn, Gwynedd
- Country: Wales
- Denomination: Church in Wales

History
- Status: Active
- Dedication: Saint Iestyn

Architecture
- Heritage designation: Grade I
- Designated: 19 October 1971
- Architectural type: Church
- Groundbreaking: 13th century

Administration
- Diocese: Bangor
- Archdeaconry: Meirionnydd
- Deanery: Synod Meirionnydd
- Parish: Bro Madryn

St Iestyn's Church is an active parish church in Llaniestyn, Gwynedd, Wales. The village lies in the centre of the Llŷn Peninsula, west of Pwllheli and south-west of Caernarfon. Cadw records that the church dates from the 13th century. It is a Grade I listed building.

== History ==
The village of Llaniestyn stands 13 km west of Pwllheli and 42 km south-west of Caernarfon. The church stands in the centre and is dedicated to Saint Iestyn. A Welsh hermit of the 6th or 7th centuries, Llaniestyn Church, and another, St Iestyn's Church, Llaniestyn on Anglesey, are the only two churches dedicated to him. The church dates from the 13th century. Later medieval additions were made in the 14th and 15th centuries. The church was restored by the Bangor Diocesan architect, Henry Kennedy, in 1858. (Note: The Church in Wales Historic Record for the building attributes the restoration to D. Roberts of Beaumaris and dates it to 1855. This is likely a confusion with the restoration of the Anglesey church, which both Cadw and Pevsner attribute to D. Roberts and date to 1865.)

The church remains an active parish church in the Diocese of Bangor and regular services are held.

== Architecture and description ==
Richard Haslam, Julian Orbach and Adam Voelcker, in their 2009 edition Gywnedd, in the Buildings of Wales series, describe the church as to a "double-nave" plan. Both Cadw and the Royal Commission on the Ancient and Historical Monuments of Wales (RCAHMW) consider the large second nave a matching South aisle. The slate roof has a bellcote. The construction material is local rubble. St Mary's is a Grade I listed building. Two adjacent cottages, Ty'n llan and Ty'n Llan Bach, formed the 17th century rectory and are listed at Grade II. In 1724, the vicar Rev. Owen Owen, built a new rectory to the north of the church, which is also now sub-divided and both elements listed at Grade II.

== Sources ==
- Haslam, Richard; Orbach, Julian; Voelcker, Adam (2009). Gwynedd. The Buildings of Wales. New Haven, US and London: Yale University Press. ISBN 978-0-300-14169-6. OCLC 1023292902.
