= Saint Iestyn =

Welsh saint

- The 14th-century effigy of St Iestyn in St Iestyn's Church, Llaniestyn
- Born: Dumnonia
- Died: Angelsey
- Resting place: St Iestyn's Church, Llaniestyn
- Honored in: Anglican Communion, Catholic Church, Orthodox Church
- Canonized: Pre-Congregation
- Major shrine: St Iestyn's Church, Llaniestyn
- Feast: 10 October

Iestyn (sometimes recorded as Iestin or the Latin form Justinus) was a Welsh hermit and confessor in the 6th or 7th century who is venerated as a saint. He was the founder of two churches, one in Gwynedd and another in Anglesey, both in north Wales.

== Life and commemoration ==
Iestyn's dates of birth and death are not recorded. According to some sources, he flourished in the early 6th century; according to others, he was active in the 7th century. He is said to have been the son of Geraint ab Erbin, a ruler of Dumnonia (a Celtic kingdom in what is now southwest England). His brothers were recorded as including Cador, Duke of Cornwall, and Cyngar (another saint who is commemorated in the name of the church at Llangefni, Anglesey). Iestyn, a hermit and confessor who was probably a follower of the Anglesey saint Cybi, founded two churches in north Wales: one, St Iestyn's Church, Llaniestyn, Gwynedd, and another St Iestyn's Church, Llaniestyn in Anglesey. The Anglesey church contains a late 14th-century carved effigy stone of him wearing a hooded cloak with a brooch, holding a staff in his right hand and an inscribed scroll in his left. The inscription, in Latin, says that Iestyn lies here and notes also the names of the donors of the effigy. It may originally have been used as a shrine for the saint. He may also have founded the church at St Just in Roseland, in a part of modern-day Cornwall within his father's influence, and has also been linked with a church in Brittany, in northern France.

His feast day is not included in the Welsh calendars of saints, but was marked at his church on Anglesey on 12 April and 10 October, and at his church in Caernarfonshire on 10 October.

== See also ==
Other Anglesey saints commemorated in local churches include:

- St Cwyllog at St Cwyllog's Church, Llangwyllog
- St Eleth at St Eleth's Church, Amlwch
- St Peulan at St Peulan's Church, Llanbeulan
- St Tyfrydog at St Tyfrydog's Church, Llandyfrydog
