= Llaniestyn =

Llaniestyn may refer to:

- Llaniestyn, Anglesey, Wales
  - St Iestyn's Church, Llaniestyn
- Llaniestyn, Gwynedd, Wales
