= Elaeth =

Elaeth (sometimes recorded as Eleth) was a Christian king and poet in Britain in the 6th century who is venerated as a saint. After losing his territory in the north of Britain, he retreated to Anglesey, north Wales, where he lived at a monastery run by St Seiriol at Penmon. Some religious poetry is attributed to him, as is the foundation of St Eleth's Church, Amlwch, also in Anglesey.

== Life and commemoration ==
Little is known for certain about Elaeth's life, and his dates of birth and death are unknown. He lived in the 6th century. He is said to have been the son of Meurig ab Idno and his wife Onen Greg, the daughter of Gwallog ap Llaennog. Elaeth was apparently a chieftain in the north of Britain, and is sometimes referred to as "Elaeth Frenhin" (the Welsh for "Elaeth the king"). He was ousted from his land and thereafter travelled to Anglesey, an island off the coast of north Wales, and settled there in the monastery run by St Seiriol at Penmon, at the south-eastern corner of the island. His feast day in the Welsh calendars of saints is 10 November; one calendar, apparently by mistake, gives the date as 11 November.

Some religious poetry that he is said to have written has been preserved in medieval manuscripts. The Black Book of Carmarthen, from the 12th century, attributes two poems of seven stanzas to his authorship, one of simple construction and the other more complicated. Both "are written in a strain of deepest piety."

He is the reputed founder of St Eleth's Church, Amlwch, in the north of Anglesey. A holy well near there, known as "Ffynnon Elaeth" in Welsh, was named after him, and was regarded as having healing qualities and providing a method of divination. A nearby "priest" would interpret the behaviour and activities of an eel kept in the well; on some occasions, the eel would remain out of sight and those seeking answers would have to wait for its re-emergence.

== See also ==
Other Anglesey saints commemorated in local churches include:

- St Cwyllog at St Cwyllog's Church, Llangwyllog
- St Iestyn at St Iestyn's Church, Llaniestyn
- St Peulan at St Peulan's Church, Llanbeulan
- St Tyfrydog at St Tyfrydog's Church, Llandyfrydog
