= Cwyllog =

Holy woman in 6th century Wales

Saint Cwyllog (or Cywyllog) was a Christian holy woman who was active in Anglesey, Wales, in the early 6th century. The daughter, sister and niece of saints, she is said to have founded St Cwyllog's Church, Llangwyllog, in the middle of Anglesey, where a church is still dedicated to her.

== Life and commemoration ==
Little is known for certain about Cwyllog (sometimes written as Cywyllog); her dates of birth and death are not given in the sources. She is said to have been one of the daughters of St Caw. He was a king in northern Britain who lost his lands and sought safety with his family in Anglesey, where the ruler Maelgwn Gwynedd gave him land in the north-east of the island, the district known as Twrcelyn. Other saintly relatives of Cwyllog included St Iestyn and St Cyngar (brothers of Caw) and her sisters Cain, Peithian and Gwenafwy as well as various brothers including St Gildas (although the number of Caw's children varies from 10 to 21 between different manuscripts). Cwyllog is said to have been the wife of Mordred (or Medrod), the treacherous son and nephew of King Arthur and mother of his sons. According to the 19th-century Welsh antiquarian Angharad Llwyd, in her History of Anglesey, Cwyllog decided to follow a religious life after her husband's death in battle against Arthur at the Battle of Camlann in 537.

She is said to have founded St Cwyllog's Church, Llangwyllog, towards the middle of Anglesey but within the area granted to her father, in the 6th century. The current church there (which is still dedicated to her) is of a later date, with the walls possibly dating from about 1200. Her feast day there has been recorded as being 7 January, although this date does not appear in the Welsh calendars of saints.

According to critics, Cwyllog may be a fictional creation. Her name could be a back-formation from the place-name Llangwyllog. The original saint of that location would be Gwrddelw, son of Caw, whose feast day is also 7 January. Cwyllog's connection to Mordred originated with readings of Hector Boece, who said Mordred's wife was a daughter of Gawolane. Some scholars identified "Gawolane" as Caw of Prydyn, which caused Welsh antiquary Lewis Morris to list Gildas as Medrawd's brother-in-law and, eventually, “Kwyllog” as Medrawd's wife.

== See also ==
Other Anglesey saints commemorated in local churches include:

- St Eleth at St Eleth's Church, Amlwch
- St Iestyn at St Iestyn's Church, Llaniestyn
- St Peulan at St Peulan's Church, Llanbeulan
- St Tyfrydog at St Tyfrydog's Church, Llandyfrydog
