= Peulan =

Saint Peulan was a Welsh holy man in the early part of the 6th century, the son of Paulinus, a saint from south Wales who taught Saint David. A follower of Cybi, a saint associated with the island of Anglesey in north Wales, Peulan is commemorated in the dedication of the church he reportedly founded, St Peulan's Church, Llanbeulan, on Anglesey.

== Life and commemoration ==
Little is known for certain about Peulan or his life. His dates of birth and death are not recorded, although he is said to have lived in the early part of the 6th century. He is said to have been the son of Paul Hên o Fanaw (also known as Paulinus), a 5th-century saint associated with Whitland in Carmarthenshire, south Wales, and who taught Saint David. Peulan means "little Paul". Peulan's sister is said to have been Gwenfaen, a saint commemorated in the name of a church at Rhoscolyn, on Holy Island, Anglesey. His brother was Gwyngeneu, who was also commemorated with a church on Holy Island that no longer exists.

Peulan was a follower of the Anglesey-based saint Cybi, and travelled there with him from Cornwall; he is said to have been one of Cybi's twelve "seamen" forming his "family." He is the reputed founder of St Peulan's Church, Llanbeulan; it is said that he founded the first church there in 630, although the earliest parts of the present building date from the 12th century. The church is now closed and in the care of the Friends of Friendless Churches.

He is venerated as a saint, although he was never canonized by a pope: as the historian Jane Cartwright notes, "In Wales sanctity was locally conferred and none of the medieval Welsh saints appears to have been canonized by the Roman Catholic Church". His feast day in the Welsh calendars of saints is given, variously, as 1 November or 2 November, although celebrations at St Peulan's Church were also noted to have taken place on 17 March.

== See also ==
Other Anglesey saints commemorated in local churches include:

- St Cwyllog at St Cwyllog's Church, Llangwyllog
- St Eleth at St Eleth's Church, Amlwch
- St Iestyn at St Iestyn's Church, Llaniestyn
- St Tyfrydog at St Tyfrydog's Church, Llandyfrydog
