= St Nidan's Church, Llanidan =

Coordinates: 53.182180°N 4.262597°W

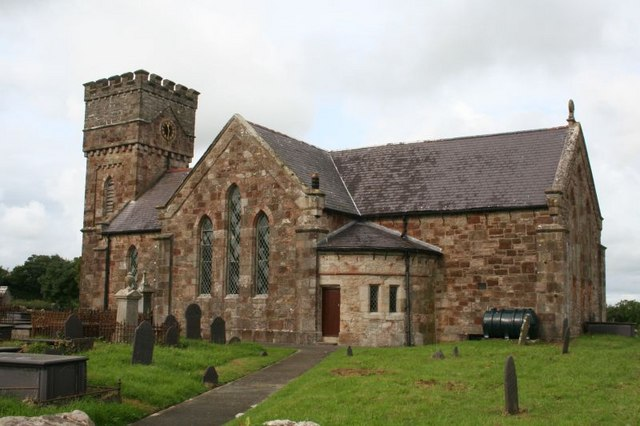
- The south side of the church

- Location in Anglesey
- Location: Brynsiencyn, Anglesey
- Country: Wales
- Denomination: Church in Wales

History
- Status: Church
- Founded: 1839–1843
- Dedication: Nidan

Architecture
- Functional status: Active
- Heritage designation: Grade II
- Designated: 30 January 1968
- Architect: John Welch
- Style: Gothic Revival

Specifications
- Materials: Red gritstone dressed with sandstone

Administration
- Province: Province of Wales
- Diocese: Diocese of Bangor
- Archdeaconry: Bangor
- Deanery: Tindaethwy and Menai
- Parish: Newborough with Llanidan with Llangeinwen and Llanfair-yn-y-Cymwd

St Nidan's Church, Llanidan is a 19th-century parish church near the village of Brynsiencyn, in Anglesey, north Wales. Built between 1839 and 1843, it replaced the Old Church of St Nidan, Llanidan, which needed significant repair, providing a place of Anglican worship nearer to the village than the old church. Some items were moved here from the old church, including the 13th-century font, two bells from the 14th and 15th century, and a reliquary thought to hold the remains of St Nidan. The tower at the west end has been described as "top heavy" and looking like "a water tower".

The church is still used for worship by the Church in Wales, one of five in a group of parishes in the south of Anglesey. It is a Grade II listed building, a national designation given to "buildings of special interest, which warrant every effort being made to preserve them", in particular because it is regarded as "a distinctive example of pre-archaeological gothic revival work." The 19th-century clergyman and antiquarian Harry Longueville Jones said that it had been built in a "debased barbarous style, showing neither architectural science nor taste".

== History and location ==
St Nidan's Church was built between 1839 and 1843, replacing its medieval predecessor. The architect was John Welch, who also designed St Ffinan's Church, Llanffinan, in central Anglesey, which was built in 1841. St Nidan's was originally intended to have a spire on the west tower, but this was not added. The chancel was built in 1882, and a vestry and organ chamber added later. The battlements on the tower were added in 1933, replacing the original gabling. St Nidan's is set within a walled churchyard on the north of the A4080 road, in the south of Anglesey, Wales. The village of Brynsiencyn is about 500 metres (about one-third of a mile) to the south-west, and the old church of St Nidan is about 750 metres (about half a mile) to the south-east.

A new church was needed because the old church needed significant repair and also because the growth of Brynsiencyn meant that more people lived there than in Llanidan itself. Like its predecessor, it is dedicated to Nidan, a 7th-century Welsh saint who was the confessor of the monastery at Penmon, on the eastern tip of Anglesey.

St Nidan's is still used for worship by the Church in Wales. It is one of five churches in the combined benefice (parishes combined under one priest) of Newborough with Llanidan with Llangeinwen and Llanfair-yn-y-Cymwd. The parish is within the deanery of Tindaethwy and Menai, the archdeaconry of Bangor and the Diocese of Bangor. As of 2019, the priest in charge is E. Roberts.

== Architecture and fittings ==
St Nidan's is built mainly from red gritstone rubble, dressed with sandstone, with buttresses at the corners; the roof, which is made from slate, has stone copings with a cross at the east end. The church is built in a cross-shape, in Early English style. There is a tower at the west end, which has battlements at the top along with a clock on the east and west sides, a belfry in the middle, and an entrance porch with an arched doorway at the bottom. There are two transepts leading from the nave, one to the north and one to the south, and a chancel at the east end. There are four "equal and bold" arches at the crossing where nave, transepts and chancel meet. The quadrant-shaped organ room and vestry are built into the eastern external angles of the chancel and transepts, one on each side of the church.

The gallery at the west end of the nave, supported by octagonal columns, is reached from the entrance porch; it has its pews set at an angle. A step leads up from the nave into the chancel, with a further two steps up from the chancel into the sanctuary. The floor of the chancel and the sanctuary are made from encaustic tiles. The internal walls have been plastered. The nave has two bays, each lit with a lancet window; the transepts have groups of three large lancent windows, as does the east end of the building. The chancel window depicts "Faith, Hope and Charity", by Heaton, Butler and Bayne (1877); it is dedicated to the 5th Lord Boston who died in 1897. One transept set of windows by Shrigley and Hunt depicts the Ascension, in memory of Anna Maria Evans (died 1929, wife of the vicar Richard Evans).

A sandstone chest with a glass front was moved here from the old church; local tradition maintains that it holds the relics of St Nidan. It was discovered under the altar of the old church, and may date from the 16th century. The church also has pews made of pine, and a semi-octagonal pulpit with decorated panels.

A survey by the Royal Commission on Ancient and Historical Monuments in Wales and Monmouthshire in 1937 noted which of the church's contents had come from the old church. The report listed the font, which has carved decoration and dates from the early 13th century; two bells, one from the first half of the 14th century (inscribed "+ E:D:A:N") and another from the latter part of the 15th century (inscribed "THOMAS AP MEREDITH"); and a carved oak chair from the time of Charles II.

In 1906, a survey of church plate within the Bangor diocese recorded that St Nidan's had a silver chalice and alms dish. These were donated probably in 1701 and remade in 1871–72. It also had a silver paten and two cruets with silver handles, all marked with the date 1871–72. Records from the 19th century indicated that two tankards (one silver, one pewter) and a silver chalice had been lost.

The churchyard contains the grave of Sir Ellis Ellis-Griffith, 1st Baronet, who was MP for Anglesey for 25 years. The grave, by the church's north wall, has a bust of the politician wearing a wing collar. Other people buried here include the Presbyterian minister and theologian J. E. Hughes, who died in 1959. There are four Commonwealth war graves, of a British Army soldier of World War I and three soldiers of World War II.

== Assessment ==
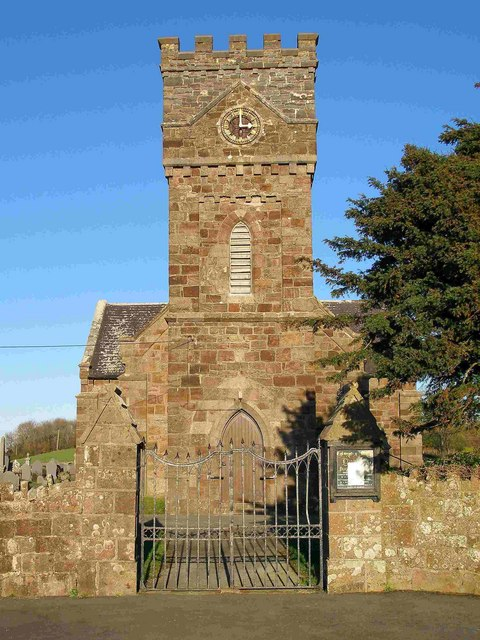
The tower at the west end of the church

The church has national recognition and statutory protection from alteration as it has been designated as a Grade II listed building – the lowest of the three grades of listing, designating "buildings of special interest, which warrant every effort being made to preserve them". It was given this status on 30 January 1968, and has been listed as "a small early 19th-century church". Cadw (the Welsh Assembly Government body responsible for the built heritage of Wales and the inclusion of Welsh buildings on the statutory lists) describes the church as "a distinctive example of pre-archaeological gothic revival work."

Writing in 1846, the clergyman and antiquarian Harry Longueville Jones condemned the treatment of the old church, which he said was "one of the largest and most important in the island of Anglesey", given its architecture, contents and traditions. He said that the new church had been built "in a debased barbarous style, showing neither architectural science nor taste, and without any example or analogy amongst the ecclesiastical edifices of any age, except the present." He also described it in 1863 as "that hideous pile ... a painfully impressive example of architectural bad taste." He said that the font was "one of the most interesting as a work of art (not later than the thirteenth century) extent in Anglesey", and although he did not consider that its design or execution matched that of the font at St Ceinwen's Church, Llangeinwen, it was "a highly valuable specimen of medieval taste." The reliquary, he added, was "unique, so far as Wales is concerned".

The 19th-century writer Samuel Lewis said that the new church was "apparently of substantial construction, but is much inferior in style to the old building." The historian and clergyman Edmund Tyrrell Green, writing a survey of Anglesey church architecture and contents in 1929, described the church as "hideous", although he said that the font was "remarkable" for its "very graceful patterns in relief showing influence of Greek classical design."

A 2006 guide to the churches of Anglesey says that it is "of fairly unusual appearance, not at all typical of Anglesey churches in its stonework or the shape of the castelled tower". It comments that the organ and vestry were in "unusually-shaped rooms", and notes the "ornate stained glass" of the Ascension. A 2009 guide to the buildings of the region says that the church is "bolder" than John Welch's similarly designed church at Llandudno. It describes the tower as "top-heavy with battlements... like a water tower", and adds that the seating is "crowded".
