= John Lloyd (rector of Caerwys) =

Welsh cleric and antiquarian

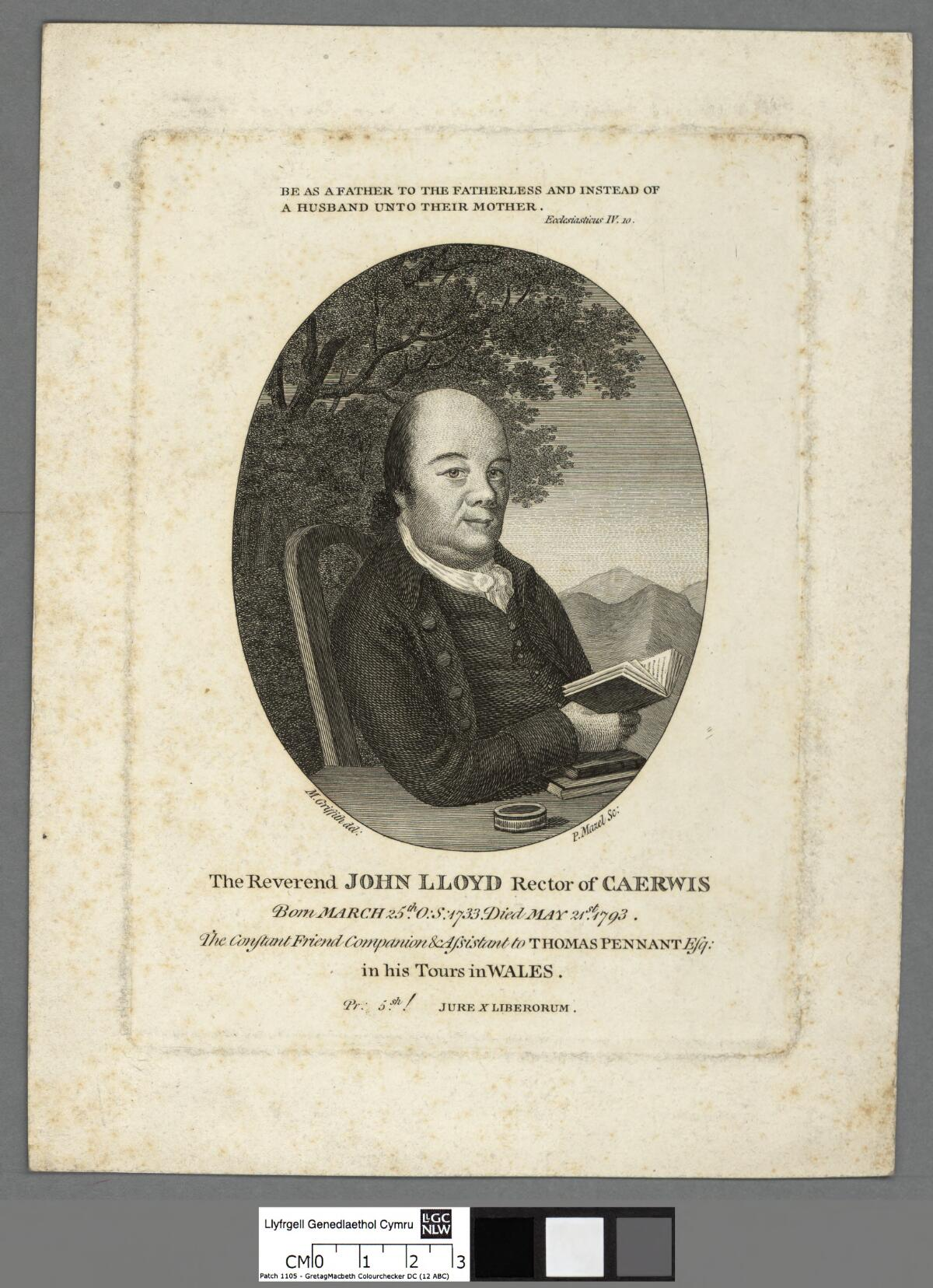
John Lloyd

John Lloyd (baptised 26 March 1733 – 22 May 1793) was a Welsh cleric and antiquarian.

== Early life ==
John Lloyd was christened in Llanarmon-yn-Iâl, Denbighshire on 26 March 1733. As a boy, he was nicknamed "Blodau Llanarmon" (the flower of Llanarmon). He was educated at Jesus College, Oxford, matriculating in July 1753. He obtained his Bachelor of Arts degree in 1757, having already been ordained in 1756.

== Career ==
In 1761, he became curate at Caerwys, remaining there even after being appointed to the parish of Nannerch in 1774. In 1778, Lloyd became rector of Caerwys (the living at Nannerch having been given to someone else) and he then remained in Caerwys for the rest of his life.

In addition to his church duties, Lloyd had an interest in scholarship. He helped to prepare the Myvyrian Archaiology and was acknowledged by Thomas Pennant in the preface to his Tours of Wales as "my worthy and constant attendant in all my excursions".

== Personal life ==
He married Martha in 1769; one of their children was the antiquarian Angharad Llwyd and another, Llewelyn (1770-1841) was himself rector of Nannerch from 1810 to 1841.

John Lloyd died on 22 May 1793.
