= Brynsiencyn =

Village in Anglesey, Wales

Coordinates: 53.180050°N 4.270878°W

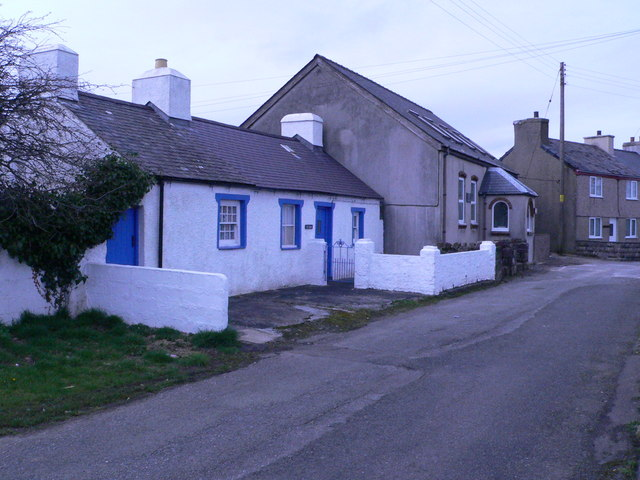

- Location within Anglesey
- Principal area: Anglesey
- Preserved county: Gwynedd
- Country: Wales
- Sovereign state: United Kingdom
- Post town: Llanfairpwllgwyngyll
- Postcode district: LL61
- Police: North Wales
- Fire: North Wales
- Ambulance: Welsh
- UK Parliament: Ynys Môn
- Senedd Cymru – Welsh Parliament: Bangor Conwy Môn

Brynsiencyn (Welsh pronunciation) is a small village in the community of Llanidan on the Isle of Anglesey in North West Wales. It lies close to the village of Llanidan and the village of Dwyran.

Its population was included in the community profile of Llanidan, which had a population of 1,019 in the 2021 Census.

It contains the parish church of St Nidan's, which is the main parish church for both Brynsiencyn and Llanidan.
