= Edmund Tyrrell Green =

English Anglican priest and theologian (1864–1937)

The Reverend Edmund Tyrrell Green
- Born: 19 March 1864; Westminster, England
- Died: 18 February 1937 (aged 72); Chichester, England
- Political party: Liberal Party
- Spouse: Margaret Roberts (m. 1891)

Ecclesiastical career
- Religion: Christianity (Anglican)
- Church: Church of England
- Ordained: 1887 (deacon); 1888 (priest)
- Congregations: St Barnabas Church, Oxford

Academic background
- Education: St John's College, Oxford

Academic work
- Discipline: Theology
- School or tradition: Anglo-Catholicism
- Institutions: St David's College

Edmund Tyrrell Green (19 March 1864 – 18 February 1937) was an English Anglican academic, curate and author. He graduated from St John's College, Oxford, with a Bachelor of Arts degree in 1886. From 1887 until 1890 he was a curate of St Barnabas, Oxford, and was then appointed lecturer in Hebrew and theology at St David's College, Lampeter, Wales. Six years later, he became professor of the same subjects in addition to being a lecturer in parochial duties since 1896. He was lecturer in architecture in 1902, and wrote several books on the details of church architecture, often using his own drawings. He was also one of the founders and first chairman of the Cardiganshire Antiquarian Society.

Besides his professional duties he held many parochial missions and in 1904 delivered a series of apologetic lectures at Southampton. In theology he belonged to the Anglo-Catholic school of the Church of England.

Tyrrell Green married Margaret Roberts in 1891. Margaret published some poetry in her own right, including a book dedicated to their son Denis Noel who was killed in action in 1917.

Tyrrell Green left St David's College suddenly in 1924. He died at Chichester in 1937.

== Authorship and writing ==
- Notes on the Teaching of St. Paul (London, 1893)
- The Thirty-nine Articles and the Age of the Reformation (1896)
- The Sinner's Restoration (1899)
- The Church of Christ (1902)
- How to Preach (1905)
- Towers and Spires ... (1908)
- Porches and Fonts ... (1912)

He was also an editor of the Temple Bible (1902)
