= St Caffo's Church, Llangaffo =

Coordinates: 53.191060°N 4.327121°W

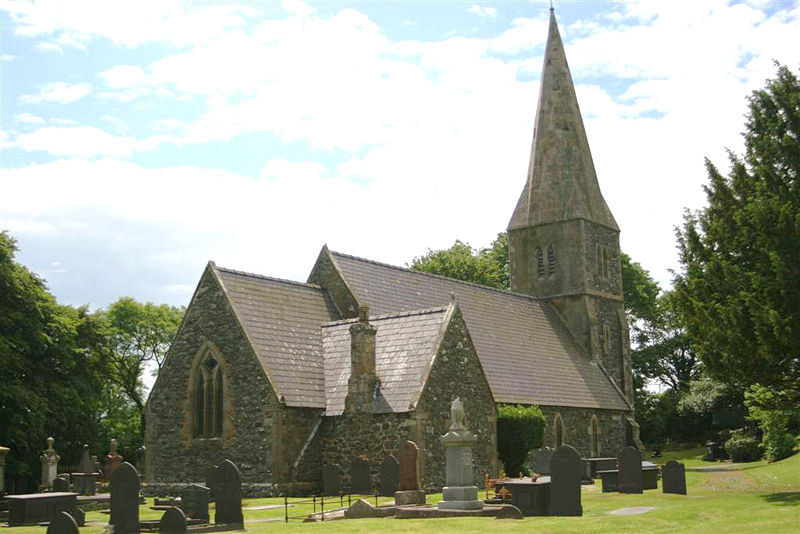
- The church from the north-east

- Location in Anglesey
- Location: Llangaffo, Anglesey
- Country: Wales
- Denomination: Church in Wales
- Website: Church website

History
- Status: Church
- Founded: 1846 (present building)
- Dedication: St Caffo

Architecture
- Functional status: Active
- Heritage designation: Grade II
- Designated: 30 January 1968
- Architect(s): Weightman and Hadfield (Sheffield)
- Style: Early English

Specifications
- Materials: Rubble masonry, slate roof

Administration
- Province: Province of Wales
- Diocese: Diocese of Bangor
- Archdeaconry: Bangor
- Deanery: Tindaethwy and Menai
- Parish: Llanfihangel Ysgeifiog (Gaerwen) with Llangristiolus with Llanffinan with Llangaffo

Clergy
- Vicar: The Reverend E C Williams

St Caffo's Church, Llangaffo is a 19th-century church, in the south of Anglesey, north Wales, about 5 miles (8.0 km) from the county town, Llangefni. It was constructed in 1846 to replace the previous medieval church in the village of Llangaffo. The new building includes a number of monuments from the old church, and has a spire which is a prominent local landmark. The churchyard has part of a stone cross dating from the 9th or 10th century, and some gravestones from the 9th to 11th centuries. It is dedicated to St Caffo, a 6th-century martyr who was killed in the vicinity.

The church is still in use as part of the Church in Wales, one of four churches in a combined parish. It is a Grade II listed building, a designation given to "buildings of special interest, which warrant every effort being made to preserve them", in particular because it is regarded as "a mid 19th-century rural church, consistently articulated and detailed in an Early English style".

== History and location ==
The date of first construction of a church in Llangaffo (a village in Anglesey about 5 miles (8.0 km) south of the county town of Llangefni) is uncertain. The village takes its name from the church: the Welsh word llan originally meant "enclosure" and then "church", and "-gaffo" is a modified form of the saint's name. St Caffo, a 6th-century Christian, was a companion of St Cybi and was martyred by shepherds in the vicinity of what is now Llangaffo, perhaps in revenge for his brother Gildas insulting Maelgwn Gwynedd, the local ruler. It is thought that there may have at one point been a monastery in this location, known as "Merthyr Caffo": merthyr is the Welsh word for "martyr", and in place names means a building erected near a saint's grave.

The present building, which is in the north-eastern part of the village on the south-eastern side of the B4419 road, was erected in 1846 alongside the churchyard to a design by the Sheffield-based architects Weightman and Hadfield. It replaced an older church, which had stood on an adjoining outcrop of rock until it was demolished. It was described by the clergyman and antiquarian Harry Longueville Jones (writing in 1846, as the new church was being constructed) as a "very small and unimportant edifice"; he also noted that it was the only medieval building remaining in the parish.

The 19th-century church is still in use and belongs to the Church in Wales. It is one of four churches in the combined benefice of Llanfihangel Ysgeifiog (St Michael's Church, Gaerwen) with Llangristiolus (St Cristiolus's Church) with Llanffinan (St Ffinan's Church) with Llangaffo. It is within the deanery of Malltraeth, the archdeaconry of Bangor and the Diocese of Bangor. As of 2012, the vicar of the four churches is Emlyn Williams, assisted by a curate (E. R. Roberts). Williams was appointed in 2007; before that, the position had been vacant for 20 years despite many attempts by the Church in Wales to fill it. Services in Welsh are held every Sunday, either Holy Communion or Morning Prayer; there are no midweek services.

Edward Wynn (1618–1669) was rector here from 1658; he later became Chancellor of Bangor Cathedral, and is buried at the church. James Williams (1790–1872) was the son of John Williams, rector of St Caffo's. He succeeded his father when he resigned in 1821, and later became Chancellor of Bangor Cathedral.

== Architecture and fittings ==
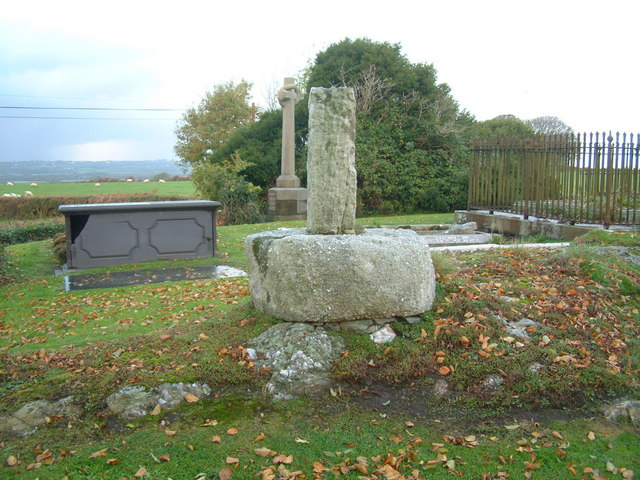
The base of the 9th- or 10th-century cross in the churchyard

St Caffo's is built of rubble masonry dressed with limestone, in an early English style (a style of architecture used between about 1180 and 1275, typically using narrow pointed windows and arches). The roof is made of slate. The tower, at the west end, has buttresses at the corners and is topped with a broach spire, which is a prominent local landmark. Entrance is through an arched doorway in the north side of the tower. The chancel, at the east end of the church, is smaller than the nave in both height and width; there is a transept on the north side of the chancel. The nave has lancet windows, and there is a further lancet window on the south side of the chancel. The church's east window is set in a pointed arch and has three lights (sections of window separated by mullions).

Inside the church, the sanctuary at the east end is raised above the chancel by one step; the floor of the sanctuary and the reredos behind the altar are made from encaustic tiles. Fittings include a circular decorated 12th-century font and a 17th-century pulpit with carved decorative panels. A 1937 survey by the Royal Commission on Ancient and Historical Monuments in Wales and Monmouthshire recorded that the church owned a silver cup and a paten dated 1736. The transept has a number of memorials dating from the 17th century (including one to Edward Wynn), and a stone from the early 7th century inscribed with ..VI / RNIN / FILIUS / CUURIS / CINI / ERE / XIT / HUNC / LAPI / DEM, which likely translates to 'Gwernin, son of Cuurius Cini, set up this stone'. The stone, which is set in the wall, originally came from Newborough, Anglesey. Just across from the main church entrance, five cross-incised grave stones have been placed leaning against the wall, the tallest of which possibly date to the 12th or 13th century, while the others range between the 9th and 11th century. These stones suggest the existence of a religious community in the vicinity during this period. The church porch houses part of a cross head in the shape of a wheel, dating from the 9th or 10th century; part of the rest of the cross is in the churchyard, but it has suffered significant weather damage with most of the patterns worn away.

The oldest graves are to the north of the church, which is unusual: ordinarily the southern part of the churchyard would be used first for burials, with the northern part remaining unconsecrated unless and until extra space for graves was required. The path between the road and the church has sunken, which may partly be explained by the medieval custom of burying the dead on top of each other. One author has suggested that the mound alongside the path might indicate that the church is located in the site of a Bronze Age settlement.

The churchyard has seven gravestones that were discovered in the walls of the previous church. Six of them date from between the 9th and 11th centuries, and the seventh is from the 12th or 13th century. The doorway from the old church, dating from the 15th century, has been reused as an entrance to the churchyard. A carved stone human head, from the 12th century, has been inserted into the north wall of the churchyard. A war memorial in the shape of a Celtic cross remembers those who died during the First and Second World Wars.

== Assessment ==
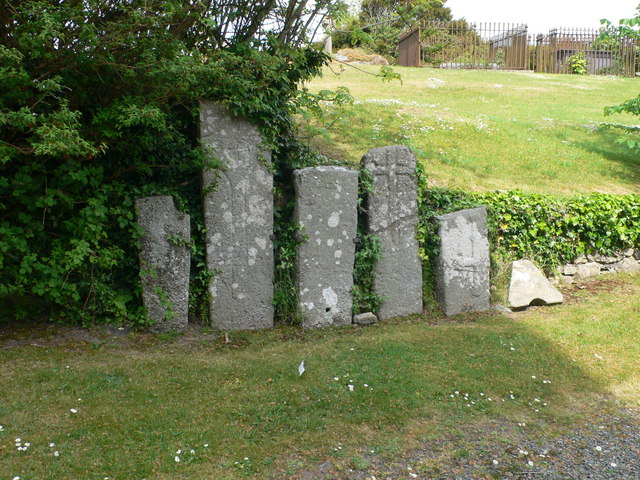
The early gravestones in the churchyard

The church is a Grade II listed building – the lowest of the three grades of listing, designating "buildings of special interest, which warrant every effort being made to preserve them". It was given this status on 30 January 1968 and Cadw (the Welsh Assembly Government body responsible for the built heritage of Wales) states that it has been listed because it is "a mid 19th-century rural church, consistently articulated and detailed in an Early English style."

The 19th-century writer Samuel Lewis said that the rebuilt church "forms a very good specimen of the early English style of architecture", adding that it was "effective from its simplicity and the absence of pretension." He added that the interior had been "fitted up in a neat and appropriate manner, and the details throughout appear to have been carefully studied". A 2006 guide to the churches of Anglesey says that the "impressive" tower and steeple" form "a landmark visible for many miles." It also comments that rendering on part of the tower and the south wall makes them less attractive than the north wall.

A 2009 guide to the buildings of the region notes the "exceptional number of inscribed fragments", showing it to be a place of early Christian worship, but considers that the church is "unlovely". Similarly, a 2005 guide to Wales describes St Caffo's as "an uninspiring nineteenth-century church from the outside" but says that it has "a remarkable collection" of memorial stones.
