= St Peulan's Church, Llanbeulan =

Coordinates: 53.251321°N 4.440883°W

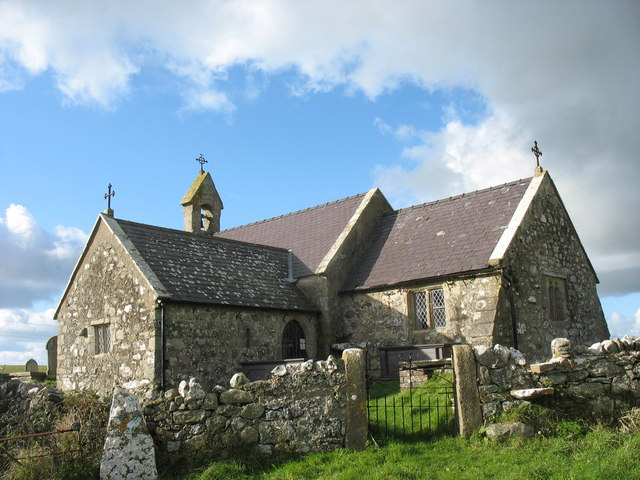
- St Peulan's Church, showing the chapel (left) and chancel (right)

- Location in Anglesey
- Location: Llanbeulan, Anglesey
- Country: Wales
- Denomination: Church in Wales

History
- Status: Church
- Founded: Unknown
- Dedication: St Peulan

Architecture
- Functional status: Redundant church in the care of the Friends of Friendless Churches
- Heritage designation: Grade II*
- Designated: 5 April 1971
- Style: Medieval

Specifications
- Length: Nave: 27 ft 6 in (8.4 m); Chancel: 15 ft 6 in (4.7 m)
- Width: Nave: 15 ft 6 in (4.7 m); Chancel: 11 ft 9 in (3.6 m)
- Materials: Rubble masonry, dressed with gritstone

St Peulan's Church, Llanbeulan is a redundant Anglican church in Llanbeulan, in Anglesey, north Wales. The nave, which is the oldest part of the building, dates from the 12th century, with a chancel and side chapel added in the 14th century. The church has a font of early date, possibly from the first half of the 11th century: one historian has said that it would initially have been used as an altar and that "as an altar of the pre-Norman period it is a unique survivor in Wales and, indeed, in Britain".

The redundant church has been in the care of the charity, the Friends of Friendless Churches since 2005. It is a Grade II* listed building, a designation given to "particularly important buildings of more than special interest", because it is a medieval church of "typical Anglesey type" that has retained its simple character despite 19th-century alterations.

== History and location ==
The date of foundation of the church in Llanbeulan is not known for certain, although it is said that a church was founded on this site in 630 by St Peulan. He was a disciple of the Anglesey saint Cybi. The earliest parts of the building date from the 12th century. It was the parish church of the area, and had a chapel of ease at St Mary's Church, Tal-y-llyn (now also redundant). In November 1349, records of an inquisition in Beaumaris show that the priest serving St Peulan's was one of a number of Anglesey clergymen to have died about that time, which was when the Black Death was affecting Anglesey. During the 19th century, a significant amount of church rebuilding and restoration work took place throughout Anglesey, and St Peulan's was given a new roof and new internal fittings at this time. It is now a redundant church and has been in the hands of the Friends of Friendless Churches since 2004; it is one of four churches on Anglesey for which the charity has responsibility. The charity holds a 999-year lease with effect from 10 June 2005.

The church gave its name to the parish of Llanbeulan: the Welsh word llan originally meant "enclosure" and then "church", and "-beulan" is a modified form of the saint's name. It is in a thinly populated part of rural Anglesey, about 1.75 kilometres (1.09 mi) to the south-west of the village of Gwalchmai, and about 3 kilometres (1.9 mi) to the south-east of Bryngwran. A grassed track runs from the road to the church. To the east of the church, the churchyard contains a war grave of a Royal Welsh Fusiliers soldier of the First World War.

== Architecture and fittings ==
The church is built from rubble masonry, dressed with gritstone. The nave measures 27 feet 6 inches by 15 feet 6 inches (8.4 by 4.7 m), the chancel is 15 feet 6 inches by 11 feet 9 inches (4.7 by 3.6 m), and the south chapel is 11 feet 3 inches by 16 feet (3.4 by 4.9 m). The building has a slate roof with copings of stone. At the west end, there is a gabled bellcote with one bell; crosses made of iron are fixed to the roofs of the chancel and south chapel. The nave of the church, which has two bays, was probably built in the 12th century. An entrance at the west end of the nave has been blocked up and plastered over on the outside. The chancel, which is smaller than the nave, and a chapel (on the south side of the building attached to the nave) were added in the 14th century, and the arches dividing the nave from the chapel and the chancel are of this date. The entrance door, from the 19th century, is positioned on the east side of the chapel and has a pointed archway. Alongside the doorway is a stone inscribed with the year 1637, and next to that is a round-headed small window dating from the 12th century, reset in the chapel wall of later date. It has been suggested that this window may have been reused from the blocked nave entrance.

The east window of the chancel, from the 15th century, has two lights topped with trefoils and decorated with carved heads. There is also a blocked 14th-century window in the chancel's north wall and an early 16th-century window in the south wall. Other windows in the church date from the 17th century (chapel south window) and 19th century (nave). The pews date from the 17th century: one stall in the chancel bears an inscribed panel of wood, dated 1664, recording that it is the seat of William Bold of Treyrddol. There are a number of memorials inside the church from the 17th, 18th and early 19th centuries. The church's 19th-century fittings, such as the pulpit and altar rail, are plain.

The most notable feature of the church is its font, which dates from the late 12th century, or possibly even the first part of the 11th century. It measures 2 feet (61.0 cm) by 2 feet 11 inches (88.9 cm) (external measurements) and is 11 inches (27.9 cm) deep. It is rectangular and decorated on three sides. One of the shorter sides has a cross with four arms of equal length imposed on a ring; at the base are two small hemispheres, and the design is framed with bands (some plain, some decorated with chevrons or a twisted rope pattern). It has been suggested that the hemispheres are bee skeps. One of the longer sides has a row of arches forming an arcade above a pattern of lozenges. The other shorter side has a chequerwork pattern. The archeologist David Petts has noted that it is one of a number of fonts on Anglesey that has an area with little or no carving, perhaps because it was never anticipated that the plain side of the font would be seen or because the font was carved after being put in its position in the church. Although similar in style to other Anglesey fonts, its rectangular shape is "unique", according to Petts, and the cross on one side "finds no parallels among fonts of this period."

One writer, the historian Peter Lord, has suggested that it was initially used as an altar. Accepting the 11th-century dating, Lord stated that "as an altar of the pre-Norman period it is a unique survivor in Wales and, indeed, in Britain". Petts considers this "unlikely", suggesting that it may originally have been a reliquary. The Friends of Friendless Churches describes the font as the building's "chief glory". It has also been called "the best of Anglesey's remarkable Romanesque series." It has similarities of design and style with the fonts of two other churches on Anglesey (St Llwydian's Church, Heneglwys and St Iestyn's Church, Llaniestyn) and with one of the stone crosses at St Seiriol's Church, Penmon.

== Assessment ==
The church is a Grade II* listed building – the second-highest (of three) grade of listing, designating "particularly important buildings of more than special interest". It was given this status on 5 April 1971, and has been listed because it is "a rural Medieval church retaining its simple character." It is described by Cadw (the Welsh Assembly Government body responsible for the built heritage of Wales) as a church "of typical Anglesey type", where the 19th-century restoration work has "retained the simplicity of design and construction", and also the church's medieval character.

In the 19th century, the writer Samuel Lewis said that it was "small and of rude workmanship", but had "several curious features" such as the font that made it "valuable". The antiquarian Angharad Llwyd, writing in 1833, described it as "a small cruciform structure, situated in a little barren valley", with the south transept "bearing evidence of very great antiquity." She stated that there were some windows "in the later English style, of good design, especially the east window of the chancel, which is a very superior composition."
