= St Cwyllog's Church, Llangwyllog =

Coordinates: 53.290160°N 4.350826°W

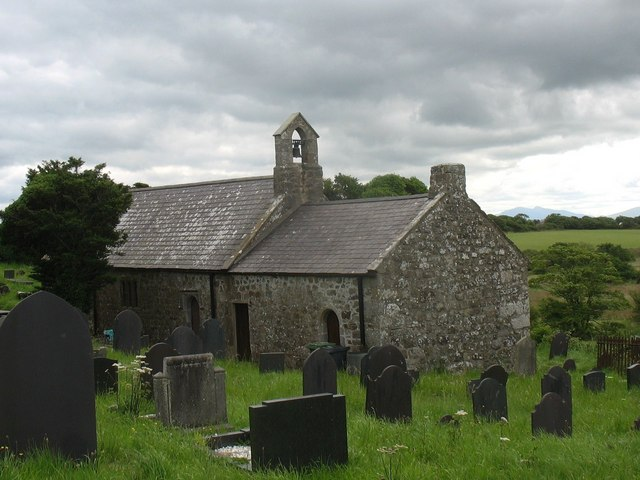
- St Cwyllog's Church from the north-west, showing the annexe to the main church

- Location in Anglesey
- Location: Llangwyllog, Anglesey
- Country: Wales
- Denomination: Church in Wales

History
- Status: Church
- Founded: 6th century; earliest parts of the present building may be from c.1200
- Founder: St Cwyllog
- Dedication: St Cwyllog

Architecture
- Functional status: Active
- Heritage designation: Grade II*
- Designated: 12 May 1970
- Style: Medieval

Specifications
- Length: 45 ft 6 in (13.9 m)
- Width: 15 ft 3 in (4.6 m)
- Materials: Rubble masonry and quoins

Administration
- Province: Province of Wales
- Diocese: Diocese of Bangor
- Archdeaconry: Bangor
- Deanery: Malltraeth
- Parish: Llandrygarn with Bodwrog with Heneglwys with Trewalchmai with Llannerch-y-medd

Clergy
- Vicar: Vacant since December 2000

St Cwyllog's Church, Llangwyllog, is a medieval church near Llangwyllog, in Anglesey, North Wales. St Cwyllog founded a church here in the 6th century, although the exact date is unknown. The existence of a church here was recorded in 1254 and parts of the present building may date from around 1200. Other sections are from the 15th century, with an unusual annex. (possibly intended for use as a schoolroom) added in the 16th century. The church contains some 18th-century fittings, including a rare Georgian three-decker pulpit and reading desk.

The church is still in use for worship by the Church in Wales, as one of seven churches in a combined group of parishes. It is a Grade II* listed building, a national designation given to "particularly important buildings of more than special interest", because it is regarded as a "good rural medieval church" with some features from the 15th century, as well as the 18th-century fittings.

== History and location ==
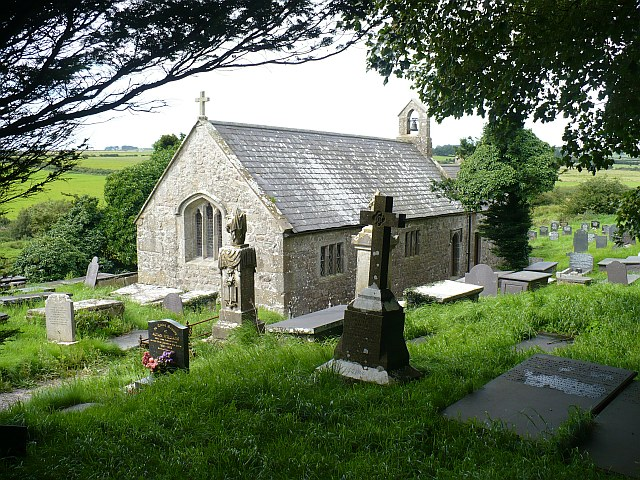
The church from the east, showing the 15th-century arched east window

St Cwyllog's Church is in a rural location in the middle of Anglesey, about 3 miles (5 km) north-west of Llangefni, the county town, and a short distance from the small village of Llangwyllog. The village takes its name from the church: the Welsh word llan originally meant "enclosure" and then "church", and "–gwyllog" is a modified form of the saint's name.

The first church on this site was established by Cwyllog, a female saint, in the 6th century, although the exact date is unknown. She was one of the daughters of St Caw, a king in northern Britain who lost his lands and sought safety with his family in Anglesey, where the ruler Maelgwn Gwynedd gave him land. There was a church here at the time of the Norwich Taxation in 1254, and the present walls may date from around 1200. In the 13th century, the church was under the control of the Augustinian canons of the priory at Penmon, on the east of Anglesey, with the priory gaining the income from the tithes paid to the church. The priory gradually diminished in size and importance, and in 1522 the prior and two canons (the entire community, at that stage) affixed their signature to the lease of Llangywllog church to Richard Bulkeley (a member of a prominent family from the Anglesey town of Beaumaris) for the period of 100 years at an annual rent of £1.

The north doorway and the east window are from the late 15th century. An annexe was added at the west end in the latter half of the 16th century. Some restoration work was carried out in 1812, funded by Thomas Bulkeley, 7th Viscount Bulkeley, with further work in 1854.

St Cwyllog's, now part of the Church in Wales, is still used for services, although in 2011 a service was only scheduled on the third Sunday of each month in the afternoon. The church is one of three in the parish of Llannerch-y-medd, which is part of a combined benefice with four other parishes (Llandrygarn, Bodwrog, Heneglwys and Trewalchmai) which have seven churches in total. The parish is in the deanery of Malltraeth and the archdeaconry of Bangor, within the Diocese of Bangor. As of 2013, the position of vicar is vacant.

== Architecture and fittings ==
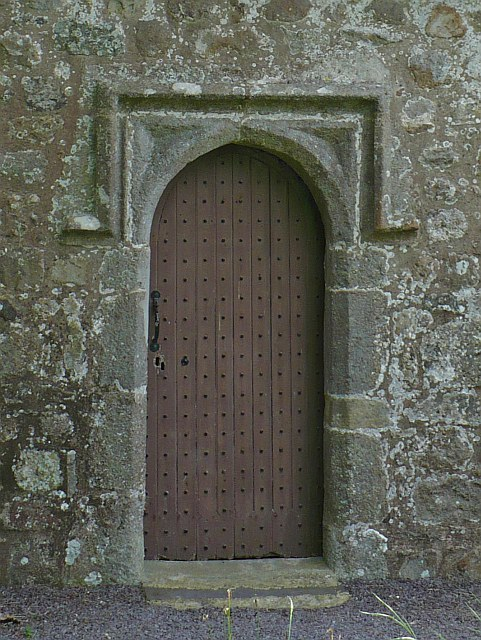
The 15th-century doorway

The church is built from rubble masonry with very large boulder quoins; the roof is made from slate with stone copings. The main part of the church is 45 feet 6 inches long by 15 feet 3 inches wide (13.87 by 4.65 m); the annexe at the west end measures 20 feet 6 inches by 15 feet 6 inches (6.25 by 4.72 m). At the west end of the roof of the nave, there is a bellcote with a single bell decorated with three bull heads, dated 1661; at the east end, there is a cross. There is no structural division between the nave and the chancel. The annexe at the west end is smaller and lower in height than the main building, and was built in line with it. It may have been built for use as a schoolroom. It has a 16th-century doorway at the west end, converted into a window in the 19th century, and a modern door at the east end, as well as an 18th-century fireplace. The main entrance into the church is on the north side of the nave, dating from the late 15th century. The doorway is pointed, in a square frame.

The east window in the chancel is from the 15th century. There are three lights, headed with trefoils, in a pointed arch. Stained glass by the Pre-Raphaelite artist Henry Holiday was added in 1882. The windows in the north wall are from the late 16th century, and have square heads. The south wall has one similar window, and two copies from the 19th century.

The church has a cylindrical stone font dating from the 13th century, carved with decorations, particularly an elaborate leaf design and a knotwork pattern. The decoration, however, is incomplete and about one-third of it was left unfinished. Other fittings date on the whole from the late 18th century, as St Cywllog's was refurbished in 1769. They include a triple-decker pulpit combined with a reading desk, with panelling to the front and sides and further panelling at the back of the pulpit. It bears an inscription "M T I I WARDENS 1769". The altar has communion rails on three sides, which are probably of similar date to the pulpit, and seats nearby in the chancel on the north and south walls. There are various 18th-century memorials. To the east of the pulpit, one box pew dates from the 18th century, another from the 19th; to the west, there are open benches. The church's chest is dated 1804, and there are hat pegs on the walls.

St Cwyllog's has three chalices, made from silver, from the 16th century. The lid of one of them (dated 1578) was returned to the church in 2010 by an antiques dealer who had purchased it several years before, thinking it to be a Tudor sugar lid. Further investigations showed that it had once belonged to a nearby closed church that had transferred its silver to St Cwyllog's. A chance conversation between the antiques dealer and a local clergyman at an archeology group led to the discovery that the lid had the same silversmith's mark and fitted one of the chalices, and the dealer thereafter decided that she ought to return it to the church.

== Assessment ==
The church has national recognition and statutory protection from alteration as it has been designated as a Grade II* listed building – the second-highest (of three) grade of listing, designating "particularly important buildings of more than special interest". It was given this status on 12 May 1970, and has been listed as "a good rural medieval church which retains some C15 features and the original simple medieval plan". Cadw (the Welsh Assembly Government body responsible for the built heritage of Wales and the inclusion of Welsh buildings on the statutory lists) also notes the 18th-century fittings and memorials, and adds that the addition of a west annexe is unusual for Anglesey.

The 19th-century antiquarian Angharad Llwyd described the church as "small, but remarkably well built", and mentioned the "ancient and curious chapel at the west end of the nave." Writing in 1859, the clergyman and antiquarian Harry Longueville Jones said that St Cwyllog's had "rather better architectural features about it than most of the small churches in Anglesey." A 2009 guide to the buildings of the region describes the 1854 restoration as "tactful", and notes the "rare surviving Georgian fittings", including the pulpit. A 2011 guide to the religious buildings of Wales says that St Cwyllog's has "the earliest and finest of several pre-ecclesiological church interiors in Anglesey".
