= St Eleth's Church, Amlwch =

Coordinates: 53.410074°N 4.345189°W

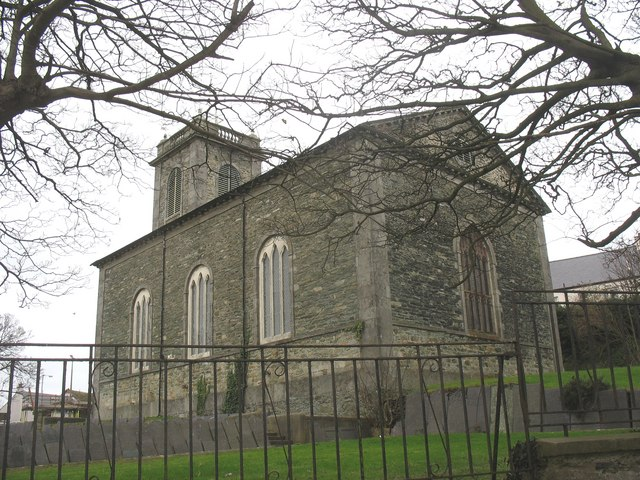
- St Eleth's Church from the south-east

- Location in Anglesey
- Location: Amlwch, Anglesey
- Country: Wales
- Denomination: Church in Wales

History
- Status: Church
- Founded: 6th century (reputedly)
- Founder: St Eleth (reputedly)
- Dedication: St Eleth
- Consecrated: 1800 (current building)

Architecture
- Functional status: Active
- Heritage designation: Grade II*
- Designated: 25 October 1951
- Architect: James Wyatt
- Style: Neo-classical
- Construction cost: £2,500 to £4,000 (c. £181,100 to £289,700 in present-day terms)

Specifications
- Materials: Rubble masonry with ashlar dressing

Administration
- Province: Province of Wales
- Diocese: Diocese of Bangor
- Archdeaconry: Bangor
- Deanery: Twrcelyn
- Parish: Amlwch

St Eleth's Church, Amlwch is a parish church built in the Neo-classical style in 1800 in Amlwch, a town on the island of Anglesey in north Wales. It stands on the site of earlier buildings, with the first church here said to have been established by St Elaeth (or Eleth) in the 6th century. Increasing prosperity in the town through copper mining during the 18th century led to the construction of a new church to serve the growing population.

The church is still used for services within the Church in Wales, and is one of four churches in the parish of Amlwch. It is a Grade II* listed building, a designation given to "particularly important buildings of more than special interest", because it is a "substantially Neo-classical church retaining much of its original architectural character".

== History and location ==
The first church in the area was reputedly established in the 6th century by Elaeth, or Eleth. He was a ruler from northern Britain who fled to Anglesey in north Wales when ousted from power, settling at St Seiriol's monastery at Penmon.

Amlwch grew and became increasingly prosperous during the 18th century after copper mining began at nearby Parys Mountain in 1768. As a result, the church became too small. Planning for a replacement church began in 1787 when Thomas Williams, "the Copper King", offered £600 (approximately £81,500 in present-day terms). The Copper Mines Company provided the majority of the money required for the new church; Henry Paget, 1st Earl of Uxbridge, and the Reverend Edward Hughes (a co-owner of the mines) also made donations. Work eventually got underway and the church, designed by the architect James Wyatt, was built and consecrated in 1800. Different figures for the cost of construction are given by two 19th-century writers: in 1833, Angharad Llwyd said that the cost was £4,000 (approximately £289,700 in present-day terms) but in 1849, Samuel Lewis stated it to have been £2,500 (approximately £181,100 in present-day terms).

The new church was constructed on the same site as earlier buildings, set back from the road on the east side of Queen Street in the town centre. Some internal alterations were made in 1867 under Henry Kennedy, the architect of the Diocese of Bangor: tracery was added to the windows, a chancel arch and arcades inserted, and the galleries removed. Restoration took place in 1999 and 2000 under the architect Adam Voelcker, when a gallery at the west end, a baptistry and meeting rooms were added.

The church is still used for services as part of the Church in Wales. It is in the parish of Amlwch, which has three other churches in the surrounding area (St Eilian, Llaneilian; St Gwenllwyfo, Llanwenllwyfo; and St Tyfrydog, Llandyfrydog). As of 2012, the priest in charge is H. V. Jones. The parish is in the deanery of Twrcelyn, the archdeaconry of Bangor and the Diocese of Bangor.

== Architecture and fittings ==
The predominant style of the church is Neo-classical, although there are some Gothic elements. It is built from local stone, with courses of rubble and ashlar dressings; the roof is made of slate. There is a tower at the centre of the west end, which houses a clock and a bell-chamber behind large arched windows; it has a parapet with pinnacles at each corner. There are two bells, one dated 1687 and the other dated 1820. The arched doorway is set into the tower, with a circular window (an oculus) above it; the tracery in this window was added in the 19th century.

Inside, the division of the nave from the narrow chancel was carried out in the 19th century through the addition of a chancel arch and creation of a chapel at the east end. Arcades were also added in the nave, to form aisles to either side. The inside of the roof is plastered. The east window contains 19th-century stained glass. There are memorial stones, mostly from the previous church on the site.

The organ is 19th-century by Bevington and is housed in a gallery at the west end that was added in the restoration in 1999 and 2000. The font dates from 1900. Outside the church, the large lychgate at the west of the churchyard dates from the early 19th century. Inside the churchyard, the gravestones have been moved to the side, possibly for ease of maintenance.

== Assessment ==
The church is a Grade II* listed building – the second-highest of the three grades of listing, designating "particularly important buildings of more than special interest". It was given this status on 25 October 1951, and has been listed because it is "a substantially Neo-classical church retaining much of its original architectural character." Cadw (the Welsh Assembly Government body responsible for the built heritage of Wales) notes that the "lightness of its Victorian restoration left the original fabric and much of the detail intact, and traces changing attitudes to church layout and style without obliterating the character of the original." It also states that the church is historically important for its links with copper mining. The lychgate has also been given listed building status at the lowest level, Grade II (for buildings of national importance and special interest), because it is a "good early example" of a 19th-century lychgate of "characteristic local type" and because it forms a group with the adjacent church.

The 19th-century Welsh antiquarian Angharad Llwyd described the church as a "spacious handsome structure", and Samuel Lewis (a writer of topographical guides in the 19th century) described the church in very similar words as a "spacious and handsome structure"; he particularly noted the "lofty square embattled tower crowned with pinnacles." A 2009 guide to the buildings of north Wales describes the 19th-century alterations by Kennedy as "egregious", but says that the interior "possesses considerable grace", with the columns of the arcades being "touched by a breath of classicism". A 2006 guide to the churches of Anglesey describes it as "a good example of a tastefully restored church", and a "spacious, high sided building with an impressive tower". It also comments that its shape is not typical of churches on the island.
