= St Tyfrydog's Church, Llandyfrydog =

Coordinates: 53.342128°N 4.33935°W

St Tyfrydog's Church
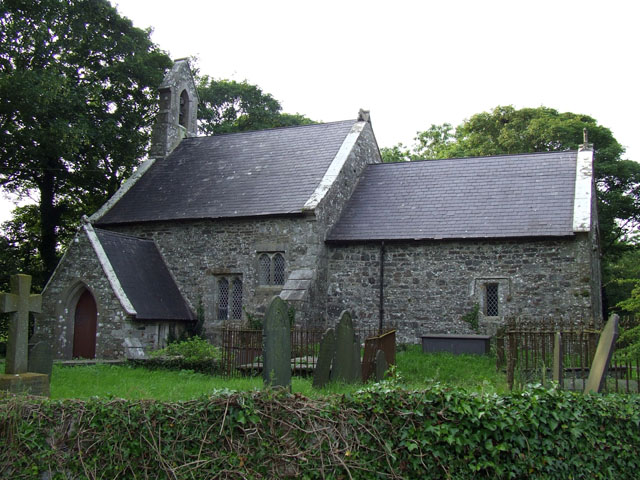
- The south side of the church, with the nave and porch to the left and the chancel to the right

- Location in Anglesey
- Location: Llandyfrydog, Anglesey
- Country: Wales
- Denomination: Church in Wales

History
- Status: Church
- Founded: c. 450 (original church); Oldest parts of current church date from c. 1400
- Founder: Saint Tyfrydog
- Dedication: Saint Tyfrydog

Architecture
- Functional status: Active
- Heritage designation: Grade II*
- Designated: 12 May 1970
- Style: Medieval

Specifications
- Length: 24 ft 9 in (7.5 m) (nave)

Administration
- Province: Province of Wales
- Diocese: Diocese of Bangor
- Archdeaconry: Bangor
- Deanery: Twrcelyn
- Parish: Amlwch

St Tyfrydog's Church is a small medieval church in Llandyfrydog, Anglesey, north Wales. The date of establishment of a church on this site is unknown, but one 19th-century Anglesey historian says that it was about 450. The oldest parts of the present building (such as the nave and the chancel arch) are dated to about 1400, with the chancel dating from the late 15th or early 16th century. It is built from rough, small, squared stones, dressed with limestone. One of the windows on the south side is raised to illuminate the pulpit, a decision that in the eyes of one 19th-century commentator "disfigures the building."

According to local tradition, a standing stone about 1 mile (1.6 km) away is the petrified remains of a man who stole a bible from the church and was punished by Saint Tyfrydog as a result. According to Gerald of Wales, when the Norman lord Hugh of Montgomery was putting down the Welsh revolt led by Gruffudd ap Cynan in 1098, he kept his dogs in the church. The dogs had gone mad by the morning, and Montgomery himself was killed within a week.

The church closed for worship in November 2020 and is now in the care of the Friends of Friendless Churches. The repairs to the church's fabric are due to commence in September 2026 - and the church should reopen in 2027.

St Tyfrydog's is a Grade II* listed building, a national designation given to "particularly important buildings of more than special interest", in particular because it is a "good Medieval rural church which retains much of its Medieval fabric". The circular churchyard walls and an 18th-century sundial in the churchyard have also been given listed building status.

In April 2026, St Tyfrydog's church and its local community featured in the series 'Abandoned. The story of Britain in six empty buildings' published by The Guardian newspaper.

== History and location ==
St Tyfrydog's Church is situated in a wooded circular churchyard in the middle of the hamlet of Llandyfrydog in Anglesey, north Wales. It is about 6 miles (9.7 km) from the county town of Llangefni. Llandyfrydog takes its name from the church: the Welsh word llan originally meant "enclosure" and then "church", and "-dyfrydog" is a modified form of the saint's name.

The 19th-century Anglesey antiquary Angharad Llwyd wrote that a church was supposed to have been first built here around 450; Samuel Lewis, writing in 1849, said that the original church was established by Saint Tyfrydog himself. An upright stone about 4 feet (1.2 m) high, which stands in a field about 1 mile (1.6 km) from the village, is known as "the thief of Dyfrydog". It is said by local tradition to be a man turned into stone by Saint Tyfrydog for stealing the church's bible; the lump near the top of the stone is said to be the sack on the man's shoulder.

In his 1191 Itinerarium Cambriae ('Journey through Wales'), Gerald of Wales mentioned the church, saying that when the Normans were ransacking Anglesey during a Welsh revolt led by Gruffudd ap Cynan in 1098, Hugh of Montgomery, one of the Norman lords, had kept his dogs in Llandyfydog church. He added that the dogs had gone mad by the morning, and the earl had been killed within a week.

A church was recorded here in 1254 during the Norwich Taxation, but the oldest part of the present building is the nave dating from about 1400. The chancel was rebuilt at the end of the 15th century or in the first part of the following century. Restoration work took place in 1823, and then again 1862, when the present porch (on the west end of the south wall) and the vestry (to the north) were added, along with other alterations.

By 2012 the church was one of four in the Church in Wales parish of Amlwch, the others being the churches of St Eleth, Amlwch; St Eilian, Llaneilian; and St Gwenllwyfo, Llanwenllwyfo; the priest in charge was H. V. Jones. The parish is in the deanery of Twrcelyn, the archdeaconry of Bangor and the Diocese of Bangor.

The last service at the church was held on 22 November 2020. In 2025, it was vested to the Friends of Friendless Churches by the Church in Wales.

People associated with the church include the botanist Hugh Davies, born in 1739 when his father Lewis was the rector; Thomas Ellis Owen, rector from 1794, who wrote anti-Methodist pamphlets; and James Henry Cotton (rector in 1814; appointed Dean of Bangor Cathedral in 1838). The priest and antiquary Nicholas Owen was born in Llandyfrydog when his father was the rector (from 1750 to 1785). Owen petitioned, unsuccessfully, on three occasions to be given the living, and he was eventually buried here.

== Architecture and fittings ==
The interior of the church, showing the box pews

St Tyfrydog's is built from rough, small, squared stones, dressed with limestone. The nave measures about 24 feet 9 inches by 23 feet 6 inches (about 7.5 m by 7.2 m); the chancel is about 23 feet 3 inches by 18 feet 9 inches (about 7.1 m by 5.7 m). The roof is made of slate, with a stone bellcote at the west end housing one bell. The roof timbers are visible from inside the church. There are buttresses at the east end of the nave and at the entrance to the porch.

The oldest window is to the east side of the porch, on the south wall, which dates from about 1400; it has two lights (sections of window separated by a mullion) topped by trefoils, set in a rectangular window frame. It is echoed by a 19th-century window on the same wall, set slightly higher to illuminate the pulpit. The north wall has two rectangular windows, one with a pair of lights topped by cinquefoils, the other a single light with a trefoil at the top. One of the windows has been inserted into an opening previously used as a doorway. The east window, which has three lights, dates from the latter part of the 15th century, and is the only window to contain stained glass. Inside, the division between nave and chancel is marked with a pointed arch, dating from about 1400. Seating is provided in the form of painted box pews, dating from the 19th century, and possibly installed at the time of the restoration work in 1823. The stained glass in the east window, depicting the Crucifixion and other biblical scenes, dates to 1873 and is by the Liverpudlian firm of W. H. Sullivan.

A survey by the Royal Commission on Ancient and Historical Monuments in Wales and Monmouthshire in 1937 noted an 18th-century communion table, an engraved Elizabethan silver cup and a silver paten dated 1721, and a memorial inside the church dated 1791. A 19th-century writer noted a seat near the altar with "R.B. 1630" upon it, said to mark it as belonging to the Bulkeley family (who were prominent and influential landowners, in Anglesey and elsewhere in north Wales, from the 15th to the 19th centuries). The churchyard contains a number of slate tombs and a sundial made from brass, dating from the 18th century, standing in the base of a medieval stone cross.

== Assessment ==
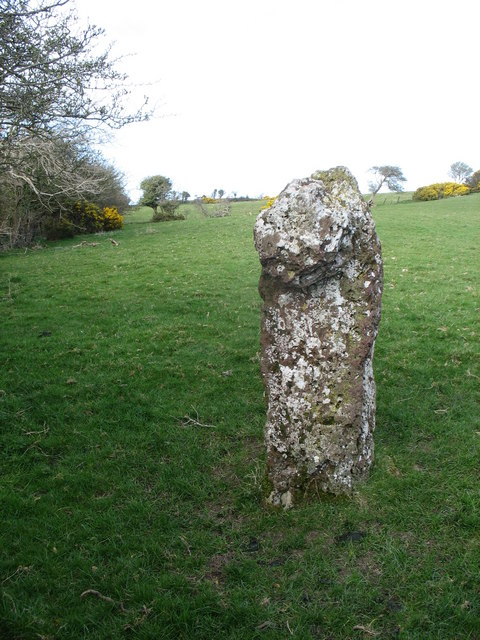
The remains of a man who stole a bible from the church, according to legend

The church has national recognition and statutory protection from alteration as it has been designated as a Grade II* listed building – the second-highest of the three grades of listing, designating "particularly important buildings of more than special interest". It was given this status on 12 May 1970, being regarded "as a good Medieval rural church which retains much of its Medieval fabric". Cadw (the Welsh Government body responsible for the built heritage of Wales and for the inclusion of Welsh buildings on the statutory lists) also notes that the church still had "a rich vernacular character." The churchyard's stone wall and the sundial have both been given listed building status, at the lower level of Grade II (for "buildings of special interest, which warrant every effort being made to preserve them").

The 19th-century writer Samuel Lewis said that it was "a lofty and venerable structure, in excellent repair", and with "a remarkably large chancel". Writing in 1859, the priest and antiquary Harry Longueville Jones said that the church was "one of the better sort" in Anglesey. At the time he saw the church, there was an old porch and the north door in the nave was still in use. He described the nave as "unusually high", and said that the window positioned to light the pulpit "disfigures the building". He also thought that the "high" chancel walls gave "great effect" to the interior. A 2009 guide to the buildings of the region described it as a "handsomely proportioned church" It particularly noted the nave, describing it as "broad, almost a square", with the chancel arch "dying into the responds".
