= Angharad Llwyd =

British antiquarian

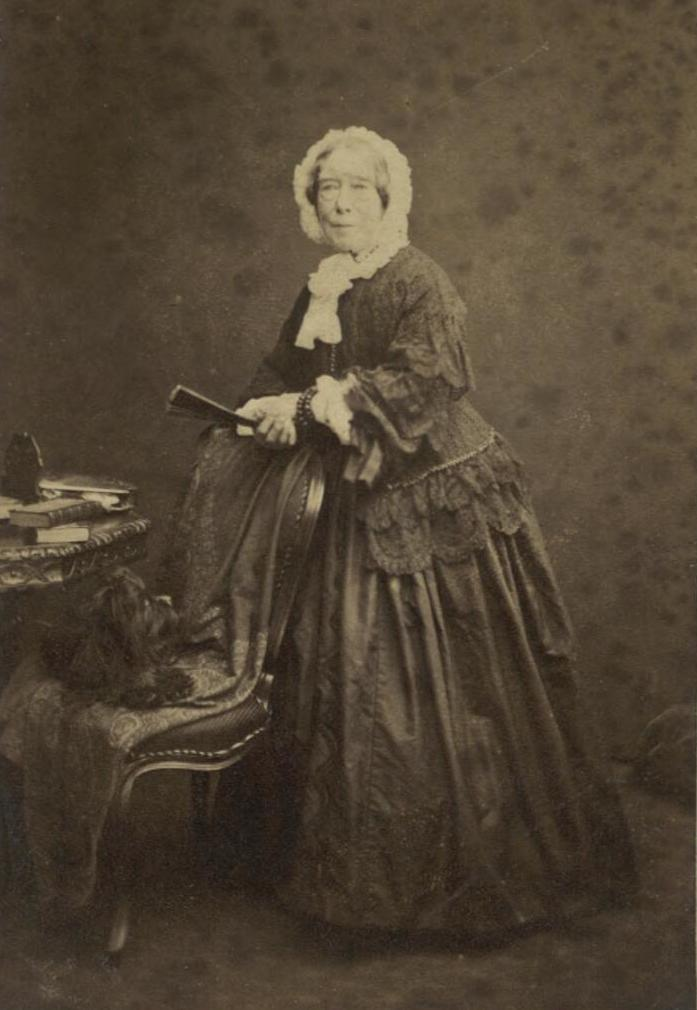
- c.1860
- Born: Ann Lloyd; April 15, 1780; Caerwys
- Died: October 16, 1866 (aged 86); Rhyl
- Known for: collecting Welsh antiquarian documents

Angharad Llwyd (15 April 1780 – 16 October 1866) was a Welsh antiquary and a prizewinner at the National Eisteddfod of Wales. She is generally considered one of the most important collectors and copiers of manuscripts of the period.

== Early life and education ==
Ann Lloyd was born at Caerwys in Flintshire, the daughter of Martha (née Williams, d. 1810) and Rev. John Lloyd, the local rector, and baptised on 17 April 1780. She was one of the youngest of eight children, her brother Llewelyn (1770-1841) later became a clergyman. Her father was a noted antiquary, nicknamed "Blodau Llanarmon" (the flower of Llanarmon) in his youth. She later took the name of Angharad Llwyd (Llwyd being the Welsh version of Lloyd) and she was an honorary member of the Eisteddfod movement.

Her father died when she was thirteen. He had been the rector since 1761 and he was the comptroller of the Caerwys Hunt. Through her father, Llwyd had already learned Latin and had shared her father's antiquarian interests. She was able to exploit her late father's wide connections with the Welsh gentry and intelligensia to gain access to their family archives.

== Antiquarian career ==
Her essay entitled Catalogue of Welsh Manuscripts, etc. in North Wales won a prize at the Welshpool eisteddfod of 1824. In 1827 Llwyd edited a revised version of Sir John Wynn's History of the Gwydir Family. This was an important 17th century account of the Wynn family. In the following year, she was among those awarded silver medals by Prince Augustus Frederick, Duke of Sussex, on his visit to the eisteddfod at Denbigh. She won another first prize at the Beaumaris eisteddfod of 1832 for her essay History of the Island of Mona.

== Personal life ==
Her mother and her family moved to a house called Siambr Wen which was in Carewys and an inheritance from her mother's family. She and her sister Helen(a) were keen socialites and they would take turns to travel so that their elder sister Elizabeth would always have company.

== Works ==
- History of the Island of Mona (1832)
