= St Iestyn's Church, Llaniestyn =

Coordinates: 53.294409°N 4.124471°W

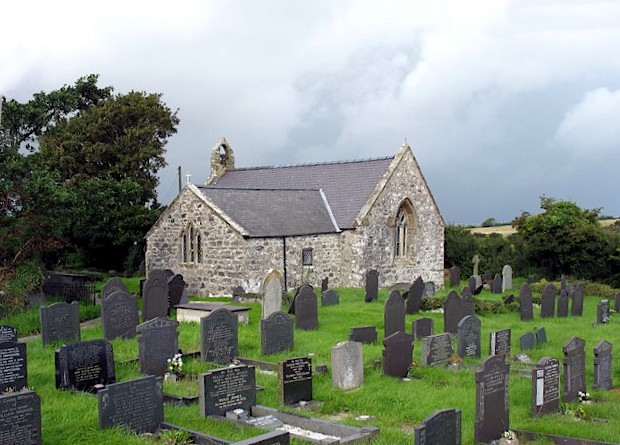
- St Iestyn's Church, with the south transept (left) and east window (right)

- Location in Anglesey
- Location: Llaniestyn, Anglesey
- Country: Wales
- Denomination: Church in Wales

History
- Status: Church
- Founded: Unknown, but possibly 7th century; earliest part of building is from the 12th century
- Founder: St Iestyn
- Dedication: St Iestyn

Architecture
- Functional status: Active
- Heritage designation: Grade II*
- Designated: 30 January 1968
- Style: Medieval

Specifications
- Length: 38 ft 3 in (11.7 m)
- Width: 15 ft 6 in (4.7 m)
- Materials: Rubble masonry

Administration
- Province: Province of Wales
- Diocese: Diocese of Bangor
- Archdeaconry: Bangor
- Deanery: Tindaethwy
- Parish: Beaumaris with Llanddona and Llaniestyn

Clergy
- Rector: Neil Fairlamb

St Iestyn's Church, Llaniestyn is a medieval church in Llaniestyn, Anglesey, in Wales. A church is said to have been founded here by St Iestyn in the 7th century, with the earliest parts of the present building dating from the 12th century. The church was extended in the 14th century, with further changes over the coming years. It contains a 12th-century font and a 14th-century memorial stone to Iestyn, from the same workshop as the stone to St Pabo at St Pabo's Church, Llanbabo.

The church is still in use, as part of the Church in Wales, and is one of seven churches in a combined parish. It is a Grade II* listed building, a national designation given to "particularly important buildings of more than special interest", because of its age and retention of many original features, including the Iestyn effigy.

== History and location ==
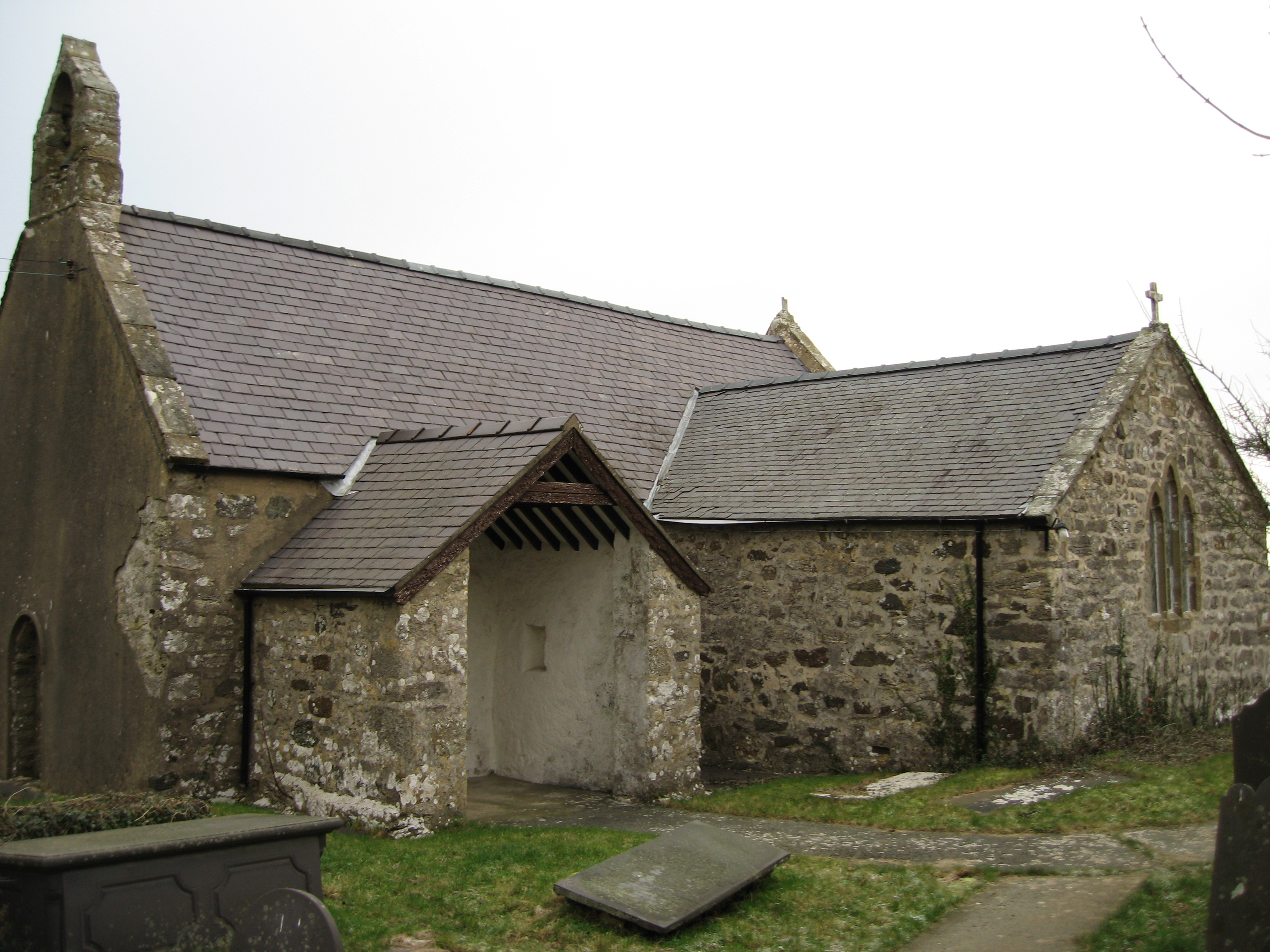
The west and south sides of the church – the old door (far left) and the newer porch (centre) can be seen.

St Iestyn's Church stands in a churchyard in a rural part of eastern Anglesey, near the village of Llanddona. The church gave its name to the area of Llaniestyn: the Welsh word llan originally meant "enclosure" and then "church", with the saint's name as a suffix. The date of foundation of the church is unknown. Geraint Jones, author of a 2006 guide to the churches of Anglesey, notes that it is thought that St Iestyn, a nephew of the Anglesey saint St Cybi, established a religious community in this place in the 7th century. It was the last of the churches that he established.

According to the 19th-century writer Samuel Lewis, the church was donated by Llywelyn the Great (c. 1172–1240) to the priory he had established at Llanfaes. It is known that there was a church here before 1254 as it is recorded in the Norwich Valuation of that year. The oldest parts of the building, including the blocked west door, date back to the 12th century. There was an extension to the chancel, probably in the 14th century; the east window is 15th-century, and the south door dates from about 1500. The 16th century saw the addition of the south transept. Restoration work took place in 1865 (renewing the roof and adding the north window) and in 1954, when the west door was discovered.

St Iestyn's is still in use for worship and belongs to the Church in Wales. It is one of seven churches within the combined benefice of Beaumaris with Llanddona and Llaniestyn. It is within the deanery of Tindaethwy and Menai, the archdeaconry of Bangor and the Diocese of Bangor. As of 2012, the rector is the Reverend Neil Fairlamb.

== Architecture and fittings ==
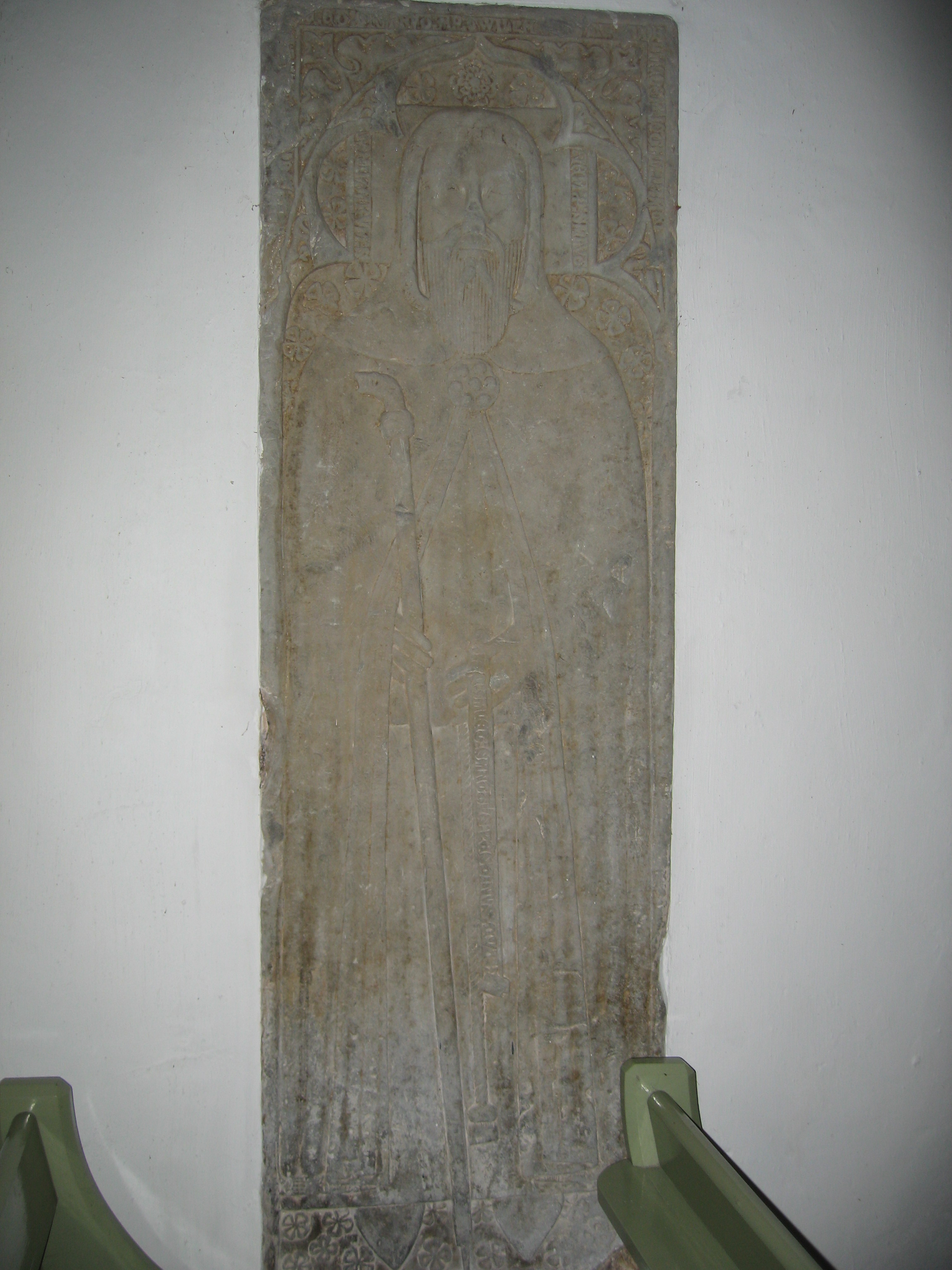
The effigy of St Iestyn

The church was built using rough rubble masonry with stone copings, with some parts covered in render. The chancel and nave together measure 38 feet 3 inches by 15 feet 6 inches (11.66 by 4.72 m); the south transept is 18 by 15 feet (5.5 by 4.6 m). The internal walls have been whitewashed. The roof is made of slate. There is no change in the structure to denote the internal division between the nave, which is the oldest part of the building, and the chancel. There is a bellcote at the west end of the roof. The church entrance is through a porch on the south side; it has been rebuilt, with some of the material dating from the 15th century. There is a round-headed door inside a square door frame, with the date 1764 on the hinge.

The east window in the chancel is in the shape of a pointed arch and dates from the 15th century; it has three lights topped with cinquefoils and a hood mould. On the north side of the nave there is a rectangular window from 1865. The 16th-century south transept has windows in the south and east walls: the south window has three lights topped with trefoils in a 16th-century arch, and the east window is small and rectangular, using some dressings from the 14th century. The wide opening between the transept and the rest of the church is spanned with a large wooden beam.

The west wall of the south transept holds a late-14th-century carved effigy stone of St Iestyn; he wears a hooded cloak with a brooch, holding a staff in his right hand and an inscribed scroll in his left. He is bearded and has the appearance of a hermit, or of a Franciscan friar (Samuel Lewis commenting that the cord and tassel hanging from the girdle around his waist were similar to those worn by monks in that order). There are flowers in the background. The historian Peter Lord has written that the depiction of the staff and brooch is so accurate that it suggests that "these artefacts, which were already objects of veneration, survived for the sculptor to copy". The inscription reads H[I]C : JACET : SANGTUS : YESTINVS : CVI : /WEN[LLIA]N [F : MADO] C : ET : GRVFFVT : AP : GWILYM : O[BT]VLIT : IN OB/LACOEM : ISTAM : IMAGIN/NE : P : SALVTE : ANIMARVM : S ("Here lies Iestyn to whom Gwenllian ferch Madog and Gruffydd ap Gwilym offered this image for the health of their souls"). It is made of grey sandstone, from Flintshire in north-east Wales – an area where the donor of the effigy, Gruffudd ap Gwilym, had land. He also had land at Llaniestyn, and it is probable that he paid for rebuilding work at the church. The woman appearing in the inscription was Gruffudd's aunt. The stone originates from the same workshop as similar memorials in the area: there is one at Bangor Cathedral, and one to St Pabo at St Pabo's Church, Llanbabo (also on Anglesey). The stone may originally have been used as part of a shrine for the saint. It was positioned in front of the altar in the 18th century, but was thereafter moved to its present location.

The cylindrical font, at the west end of the nave, is from the 12th century. The outside of the font is decorated with carvings in three bands. The bottom band contains round-headed arches, the middle band has a series of chevrons, and the top band has various crosses, chequerwork patterns and other decorations. It has similarities of design and style with the font at St Peulan's Church, Llanbeulan. There is an 18th-century stone tablet recording benefactions to the poor of the parish on the north wall of the chancel. The communion table and rails date from the late 17th century.

== Assessment ==
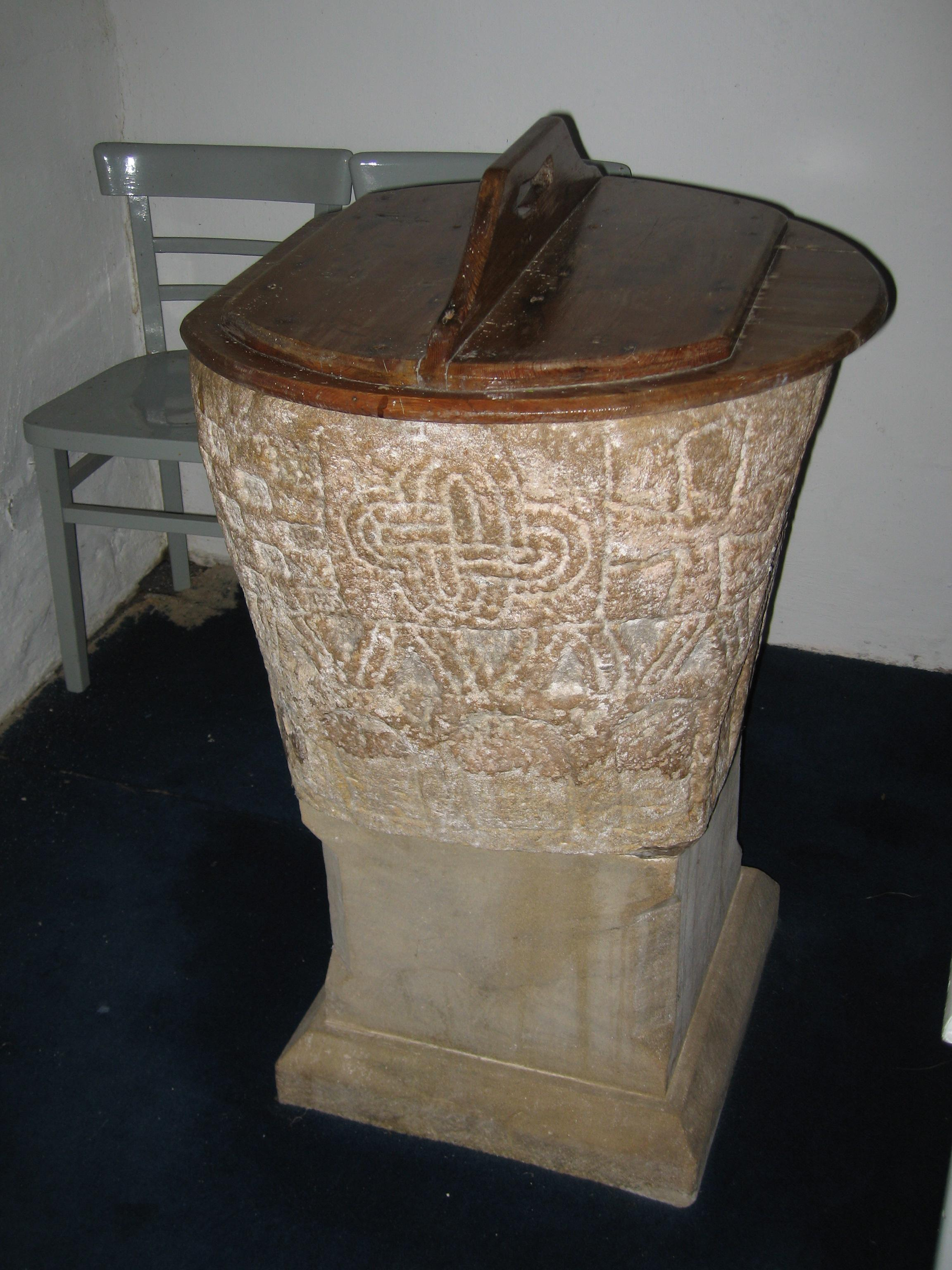
The 12th-century font

The church has national recognition and statutory protection from alteration as it has been designated as a Grade II* listed building – the second-highest of the three grades of listing, designating "particularly important buildings of more than special interest". It was given this status on 30 January 1968, and has been listed because it is a "good Medieval rural church which retains many original and early features". Cadw (the Welsh Government body responsible for the built heritage of Wales and for the inclusion of Welsh buildings on the statutory lists) particularly notes the "fine 14th-century effigy memorial" of St Iestyn.

Writing in 1847, the clergyman and antiquarian Harry Longueville Jones said that the church was one of the "plainest" in Anglesey, but had "two treasures". He described the font as "remarkably curious", and said that there were "few monumental effigies in Wales of a higher antiquarian value" than the image of St Iestyn. A 2009 guide to the buildings of the region notes the "barn-like" entrance of the porch, and describes the effigy of St Iestyn as "surprisingly accomplished".
