= List of public art in Gwynedd =

Location of Gwynedd within Wales

This is a list of public art in Gwynedd in north Wales. This list applies only to works of public art on permanent display in an outdoor public space and does not, for example, include artworks in museums.

== Abergwyngregyn ==
Image	Title / subject	Location and coordinates	Date	Artist / designer	Type	Material	Dimensions	Designation	Wikidata	Notes
	Memorial to Kinnaird	Abergwyngregyn	c.1930		Obelisk	Stone				Kinnaird was a racehorse who won 19 races in the 1920s.

== Abergynolwyn ==
Image	Title / subject	Location and coordinates	Date	Artist / designer	Type	Material	Dimensions	Designation	Wikidata	Notes
More images	Monument to Mary Jones	Llanfihangel-y-Pennant, Abergynolwyn			Obelisk on segmented base	Granite		Grade II		

== Bala ==
Image	Title / subject	Location and coordinates	Date	Artist / designer	Type	Material	Dimensions	Designation	Wikidata	Notes
More images	Thomas Edward Ellis	High Street, Bala	1903	William Goscombe John	Statue on pedestal	Bronze and stone		Grade II	Q29502898	
More images	Thomas Charles	Outside Capel Tegid, Bala	1875	William Davies (Mynorydd) of Merthyr Tyfil	Statue on tall plinth	White marble		Grade II	Q29495875	

== Bangor ==
Image	Title / subject	Location and coordinates	Date	Artist / designer	Type	Material	Dimensions	Designation	Wikidata	Notes
	Bangor Railway Institute war memorial	Bangor Railway Station	1919		Plaque	Black marble	0.9m x 0.4m			Originally located in St David's Church, Glenadda, relocated in 2019.
More images	War memorial	Memorial Gardens, Bangor	1923	Messrs J Gibbons, JD Williams, Frank Bellis, W Parry	Octagonal cross on a stepped plinth with piers	Stone	7m high	Grade II	Q29483741	
More images	Stones of Remembrance	Memorial Gardens, Bangor	c.1999		Two monoliths, each set in a raised bed of boulders	Stone				

== Barmouth ==
Image	Title / subject	Location and coordinates	Date	Artist / designer	Type	Material	Dimensions	Designation	Wikidata	Notes
More images	Cardigan Bay Dolphins	Barmouth			Sculpture group					
	War memorial	Park Road, Barmouth			Pillar in 3 sections	Stone				

== Beddgelert ==
Image	Title / subject	Location and coordinates	Date	Artist / designer	Type	Material	Dimensions	Designation	Wikidata	Notes
	War memorial	Beddgelert			Column with wheel cross	Red granite	2.6m high			

== Bethesda ==
Image	Title / subject	Location and coordinates	Date	Artist / designer	Type	Material	Dimensions	Designation	Wikidata	Notes
	War memorial	Jerusalem Chapel, Bethesda	1923	RJ Hughes & Richard Williams	Cenotaph	Stone	7m high	Grade II	Q29495883	
	Penrhyn Quarry Strike Memorial	Bethesda	2000		Monolith	Slate				

== Caernarfon ==
Image	Title / subject	Location and coordinates	Date	Artist / designer	Type	Material	Dimensions	Designation	Wikidata	Notes
More images	Hugh Owen	Castle Square, Caernarfon	1887	James Milo Griffith	Statue on plinth	Bronze and Anglesey stone		Grade II	Q29483624	Plinth by Hugh Jones of Caernarfon.
More images	David Lloyd George	Castle Square, Caernarfon	1921	William Goscombe John	Statue on plinth			Grade II	Q29483625	Statue cast at AB Burton, Thames Ditton. Base by J Fletcher of Caernarfon.
	War memorial	Castle Square, Caernarfon	1922	Rowland Lloyd Jones, County Architect	Cenotaph	Stone		Grade II	Q29503405	Built by J&H Patterson of Manchester.
	Llywelyn ap Gruffudd memorial	Castle Street, Caernarfon	1987	Jonah Jones	Column with eagle sculpture	Stone and aluminium	4.5m high			Also known as the 1282 Memorial

== Corris ==
Image	Title / subject	Location and coordinates	Date	Artist / designer	Type	Material	Dimensions	Designation	Wikidata	Notes
More images	Alfred W. Hughes Memorial	Corris	1905	Goscombe John	Celtic cross on pedestal with a bronze plaque	Granite		Grade II	Q2949920	

== Harlech ==
Image	Title / subject	Location and coordinates	Date	Artist / designer	Type	Material	Dimensions	Designation	Wikidata	Notes
More images	The Two Kings	Harlech	1984	Ivor Roberts-Jones	Statue					Figures represent Bran the Blessed and Gwern from the Mabinogion.

== Llanberis ==
Image	Title / subject	Location and coordinates	Date	Artist / designer	Type	Material	Dimensions	Designation	Wikidata	Notes
More images	War memorial	Llanberis	1921		Tapered column with cross	Stone				

== Llanfrothen ==
Image	Title / subject	Location and coordinates	Date	Artist / designer	Type	Material	Dimensions	Designation	Wikidata	Notes
	Augustus	Plas Brondanw, Llanfrothen	18th-century or early 19th		Statue on column	Stone		Grade II	Q29497194	
	Flaming Urn monument	Plas Brondanw, Llanfrothen	1953	Sir Clough Williams-Ellis	Urn on column, pedestal & plinth	Stone	3.5m	Grade II	Q29497168	Erected to mark the rebuilding of Plas Brondanw after a 1951 fire.

== Llanuwchllyn ==
Image	Title / subject	Location and coordinates	Date	Artist / designer	Type	Material	Dimensions	Designation	Wikidata	Notes
	Owen Morgan Edwards and Ifan ab Owen Edwards	Llanuwchllyn	1972	Jonah Jones	Two statues on a plinth	Bronze				

== Llanystumdwy ==
Image	Title / subject	Location and coordinates	Date	Artist / designer	Type	Material	Dimensions	Designation	Wikidata	Notes
	David Lloyd George	Lloyd George Museum, Llanystumdwy	1921	Kathleen Scott	Bust on pillar	Bronze				

== Maentwrog ==
Image	Title / subject	Location and coordinates	Date	Artist / designer	Type	Material	Dimensions	Designation	Wikidata	Notes
	War memorial	Garden of Rembrance, Maentwrog	1922	Messers G Maile & Son Ltd	Wheel cross on pedestal and stepped plinth	Granite	3.5m high			

== Morfa Nefyn ==
Image	Title / subject	Location and coordinates	Date	Artist / designer	Type	Material	Dimensions	Designation	Wikidata	Notes
	War memorial	St Marys Church, Morfa Nefyn	1922		Obelisk	Granite				

== Nefyn ==
Image	Title / subject	Location and coordinates	Date	Artist / designer	Type	Material	Dimensions	Designation	Wikidata	Notes
	War memorial	Nefyn			Wheel head cross	Stone				

== Pennal ==
Image	Title / subject	Location and coordinates	Date	Artist / designer	Type	Material	Dimensions	Designation	Wikidata	Notes
More images	Owain Glyndŵr	Pennal			Statue					

== Portmeiron ==
Image	Title / subject	Location and coordinates	Date	Artist / designer	Type	Material	Dimensions	Designation	Wikidata	Notes
More images	Hercules	Portmeirion	Cast c.1863	William Brodie	Statue on plinth	Bronze statue		Grade II	Q29484475	
More images	Lord Nelson	Portmeirion			Painted sculpture	Cocade stone		Grade II	Q29484480	
	Burmese dancer	Portmeirion			Painted sculpture			Grade II		
	Gautama Buddha	Portmeiron	c.1958		Gilded statue	Plaster		Grade II		

== Pwllheli ==
Image	Title / subject	Location and coordinates	Date	Artist / designer	Type	Material	Dimensions	Designation	Wikidata	Notes
More images	War memorial	Pwllheli	1924	John Summers & John Williams of Pwllheli	Statue on pedestal	Bronze and granite	8m high	Grade II	Q29484149	

== Talysarn ==
Image	Title / subject	Location and coordinates	Date	Artist / designer	Type	Material	Dimensions	Designation	Wikidata	Notes
More images	R. Williams Parry Memorial	Station Road, Talysarn 53.0526°N 4.2571°W	1969	R. L. Gapper					Q139987850	The shape of a tree in the lower section refers to Parry's connection with Y Lôn Goed in Eifionydd.

== Trawsfynydd ==
Image	Title / subject	Location and coordinates	Date	Artist / designer	Type	Material	Dimensions	Designation	Wikidata	Notes
More images	Hedd Wyn	Trawsfynydd	1923	Leonard Stanford Merrifield	Statue on a stepped plinth with tablet	Bronze, stone and slate		Grade II	Q29505236	

== Y Rhiw ==
Image	Title / subject	Location and coordinates	Date	Artist / designer	Type	Material	Dimensions	Designation	Wikidata	Notes
	War memorial	Outside Capel Nebo, Y Rhiw			Column with urn	Red granite				
