= List of gardens in Wales =

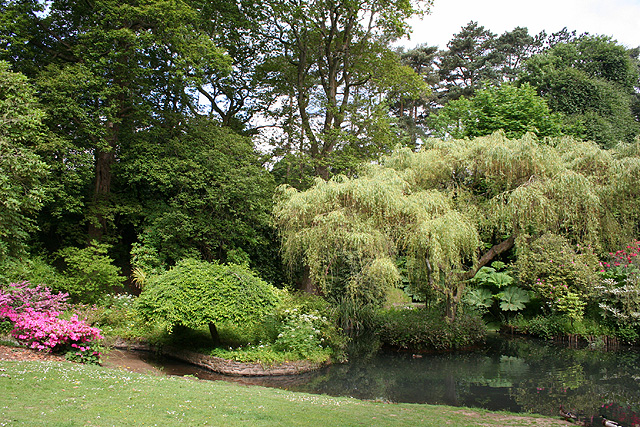
Clyne Gardens

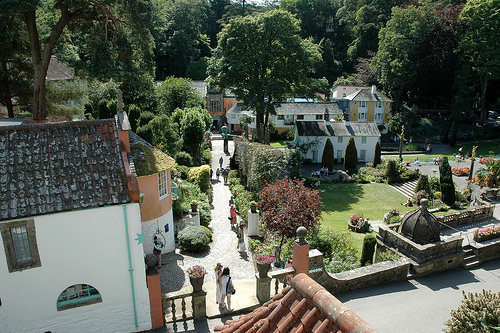
Portmeirion

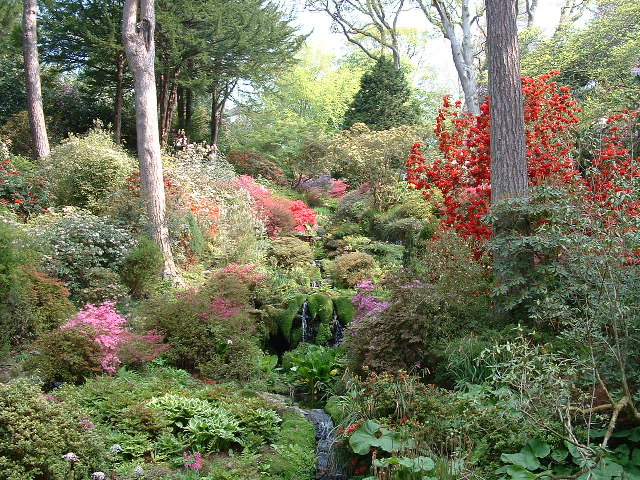
Bodnant Garden

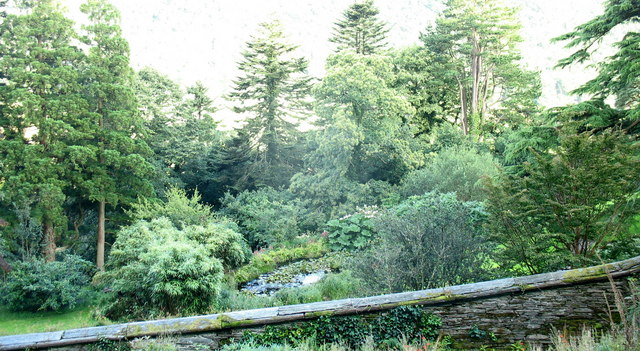
Plas Tan y Bwlch

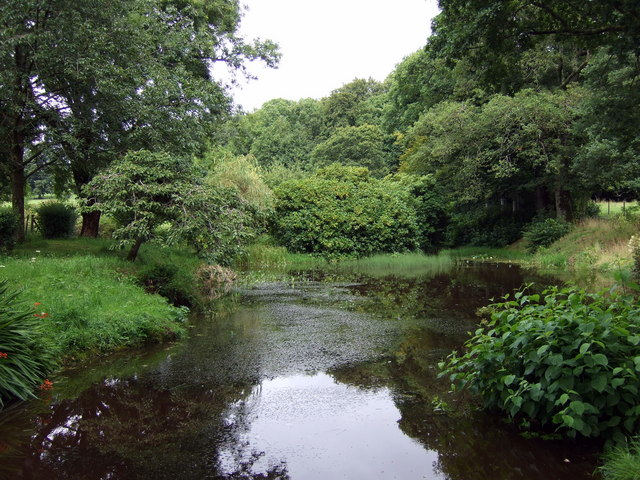
Old Cilgwyn Gardens

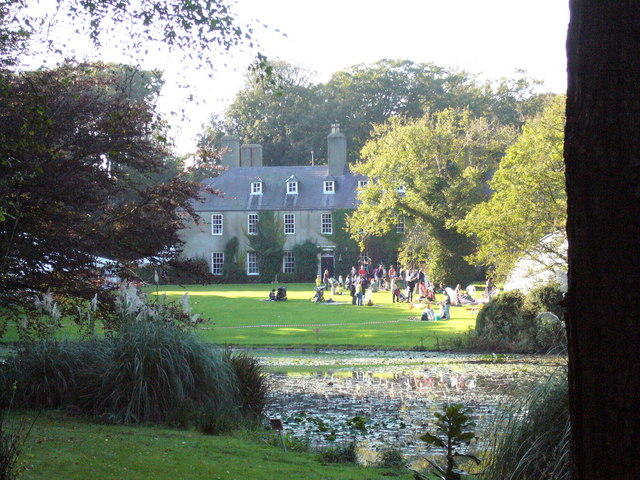
Carreglwyd

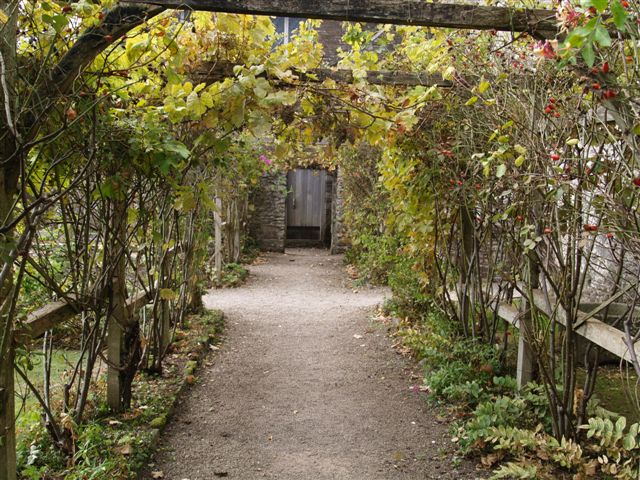
Tretower Court

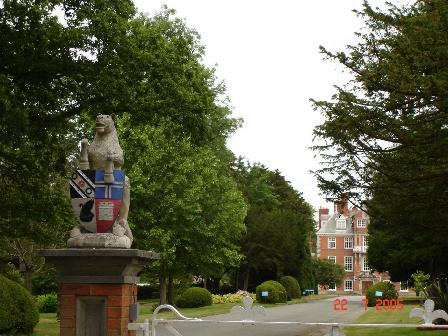
Bodrhyddan Hall

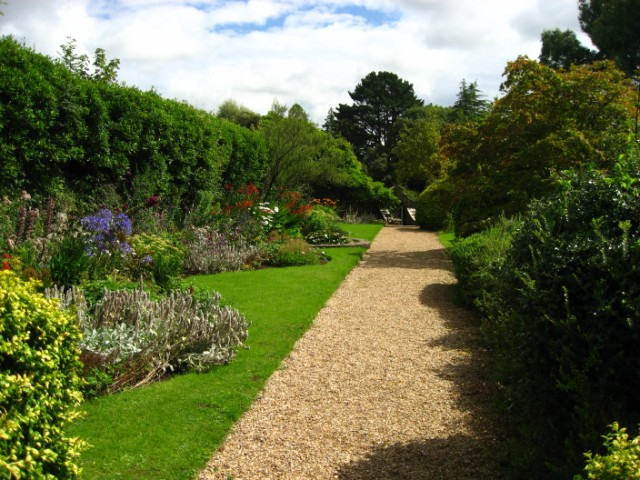
Upton Castle Gardens

This is a list of notable gardens in Wales, open to the public either regularly or by appointment.

== Anglesey ==
- Carreglwyd, Llanfaethlu
- Cestyll Garden
- Plas Cadnant
- Plas Newydd

== Carmarthenshire ==
- Aberglasney Gardens
- Dinefwr Park
- National Botanic Garden of Wales
- Norwood Gardens
- Llwyngarreg Gardens

== Ceredigion ==
- Cae Hir Gardens
- Hafod Uchtryd
- Llanerchaeron

== Clwyd ==
- Bodelwyddan Castle
- Bodnant Garden
- Bodrhyddan Hall
- Bodysgallen Hall
- Chirk Castle
- Erddig
- Gwydir Castle
- Happy Valley Gardens
- Haulfre Gardens
- Plas Teg

== Glamorgan ==
- Bryngarw Country Park
- Bute Park
- Cefn Onn Country Park
- Clyne Gardens
- Dyffryn Gardens
- Margam Country Park
- Roath Park
- Singleton Park
- St. Fagans Castle gardens

== Gwynedd ==
- Parc Glynllifon
- Penrhyn Castle
- Plas Tan y Bwlch
- Plas Brondanw
- Plas yn Rhiw
- Y Gwyllt, Portmeirion
- Treborth Botanic Garden

== Monmouthshire ==
- Bedwellty House
- Dewstow House
- High Glanau
- Llanover Park
- Penpergwm Lodge
- Tredegar House Country Park
- Veddw House, Devauden

== Pembrokeshire ==
- Colby Woodland Garden
- Ffynone
- Hilton Court Gardens
- Picton Castle
- Upton Castle, Cosheston
- Dyffryn Fernant, Fishguard

== Powys ==
- Abbey Cwmhir Hall
- Glansevern Hall
- Gliffaes, near Tretower
- Gregynog Hall
- Maesfron Hall, Trewern
- Penpont, Trallong
- Powis Castle
- Rock Park, Llandrindod Wells
- Treberfydd
- Tretower Court

== See also ==
- List of gardens
- Gardens in England
- Gardens in Scotland
- Gardens in Northern Ireland
- List of botanical gardens
- Conservation in the United Kingdom
