= Plas yn Rhiw =

Historic 17th-century manor house in Wales

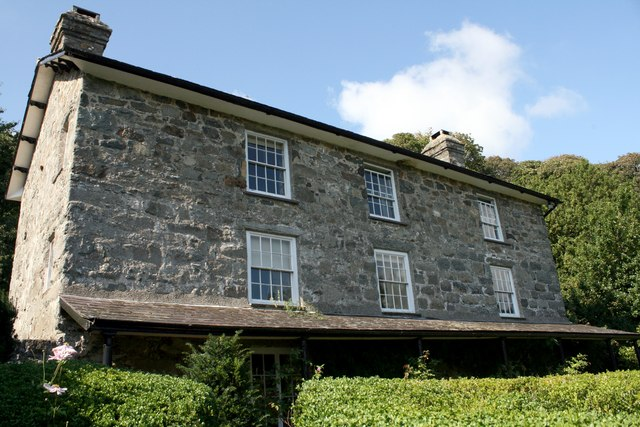

- Location within Gwynedd

General information
- Location: Gwynedd, Wales
- Coordinates: 52.8225°N 4.618889°W
- Completed: 17th century

Plas yn Rhiw is an early 17th-century manor house in Y Rhiw, Gwynedd in northwestern Wales. The estate consists of a small house of Tudor/Georgian style, a garden of just under one acre in size, and many wooded acres. Located at the base of Mynydd Rhiw, the estate overlooks the beach of Porth Neigwl (Hell's Mouth), Cardigan Bay, and the Llŷn Peninsula.

The history of the manor's estate predates construction of the house to some 4000 years of the Neolithic period. After the house's construction in the early 17th century (an inscription of I.L. on a window lintel is dated 1634), the manor house witnessed a long historical family saga, which ended in the 1940s when the three sisters donated it to the National Trust in memory of their parents, Constance and William Keating. Before that, they had refurbished the garden and restored the manor house to its old glory. The three sisters, who lived in the house until each of their deaths, are buried in a churchyard near Porth Ysgo, about 5 kilometres (3 mi) from Plas yn Rhiw. Plas yn Rhiw is the only organic National Trust garden in Wales. The original garden was expanded by the trust to include 150 acres (61 ha) of surrounding woodland. The garden and park are listed at Grade II on the Cadw/ICOMOS Register of Parks and Gardens of Special Historic Interest in Wales.

== History ==
=== Ancient history ===
Celtic forts within 2 kilometres (1.2 mi) of the manor house, of Middle Europe vintage, testify to local settlements some 2000 years ago. Roman legionaries were stationed at Segontium (an outpost of the Legio XX Valeria Victrix) near Caernarfon and their defence structures are corroborated by evidence near the 6th-century church of St Hywyn at Aberdaron. The location also witnessed intermarriage and family squabbles among the descendants of the Neolithic people, immigrants from Ireland and the Iberian Peninsula who had made their living here. The offspring of this generation of people are stated to be the modern Welsh families living in this area.

=== Medieval history ===
The Gwynedd Royal Dynasty had been established here around the 5th century after defeating the Irish settlers. In the 9th and 10th centuries, Irish settlers faced many invasions by the Vikings and many churches were destroyed. However, the Gwynedd kings vanquished many of the Viking invaders and also the Saxons (the English people). Rhodri the Great, the first king of all Wales, ruled in the 9th century, and his great-grandson, Meirion Goch, is reported to have built a house close to the present manor house of Plas yn Rhiw.

A conceptual version of the Plas yn Rhiw manor house has been interpreted as a 15th-century house having been built with 1 metre (3 ft 3 in) thick stone walls and mud floors, covered with meadowsweet, found locally. Small, unglazed, sliced windows were covered with waxed cloth. There was a heavy main front door. Also conjectured were a main room with a circular staircase leading to a watch tower. A fireplace with chimney lead to the thatched roof . The house was surrounded by the common setting of a farmhouse with pigsties, barns stables and houses for farm labourers.

A 16th-century "The Caernarfon Quarter Sessions Calendar" makes mention of the manor house as "Plas yn Rhiw" in the village of Rhiw. The residents of the manor house lived as respected gentry of the town, also participating in jury duty in the judicial system of the town. However, at that time, they did not have a traditional surname but were known by their father's name. They eventually adopted the surname as Lewis, either suffixed or prefixed to their maiden name, for another 250 years and they were prosperous in the Welsh land.

=== Modern history ===
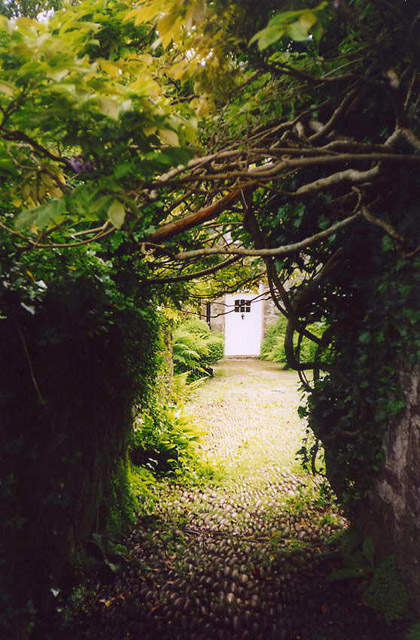
Plas-yn-Rhiw

The house originally built by Meirion Goch in the 10th century to prevent incursions by Vikings into Porth Neigwl was rebuilt. A French window in the present house, which was remodelled in 1820, has an inscription dated 1634 and attributed to John Lewis, presumed to be the owner of the house at that time. His son, Richard Lewis, was married to Rector Richard Glynn's daughter. The hierarchy that followed consisted of two sons of Richard Lewis, the second son inheriting the property after his father's death, who lived with his wife Jane in the house. They had a daughter, also named Jane, who married William William, and they had a son who was also named William William who was married to Mary Jones, the daughter of the Rector of Llaniestyn. They had only a daughter named Jane Ann who became the sole heiress of the property, in 1816. She married an army gentleman by the name of Lewis Moore Bennet. It was during this time that the house underwent further expansion.

The Bennet's only child was also a daughter who became an heiress and married a very ambitious attorney, Cyril Williams, who was the son of the Rector of Llanbedrog. They had a son but the mother died soon after child birth. In 1846, Cyril Williams became the Mayor of Pwllheli but his ambitious plans to develop the place and to build a railway line from Worcester to Porth Dinllaen via Ludlow, Tremadog and Pwllheli, and then linking it to a ferry service to Ireland, did not come to fruition as he could not muster enough support for his plans in the House of Commons. Cyril Williams remarried and had many children. His daughter, Anne Elizabeth Williams, had in fact inscribed her name on a diamond ring and placed it on glass in one of the rooms on the first floor of the house, which is closed now. After Cyril William's death in 1859, his son William Lewis Williams, an army officer, inherited the property but he died a bachelor, and the house, along with the estate, was sold for £8000.

The property was purchased by Thomas Edward Roberts of Hendre, Abererch, who lived in the manor house with his wife and children. But his son did not want to live in the house as he lived in Harlech. He, therefore, released the house and the land to Lady Strickland of Sizergh Castle, Cumbria, who lived in the manor house for two summers. She was instrumental in putting a bathtub in the house; it is now a water display item in the garden. After her, one of the daughters of Williams lived in the house for some time and then moved to Abergele in 1922. Then the house was deserted and remained untended till the Keating sisters bought it who, as children, had moved with their mother to Rhiw in 1904 and taken residence in a rented house.

In 1939, the Keating sisters, Eileen, Lorna and Honora, along with their mother, Constance, who traced their ancestry to the original owners of the manor, purchased the manor house. They embarked on a refurbishing process in which they improved the garden setting, acquiring more land to enhance the environmental setting of the house.

== Buildings ==
The walls, measuring a depth of 6.5 feet (2.0 m) in places, were constructed of large stones. A third storey was built as an extension to the old manor house built in the 17th century. A stair-wing was added to the rear. It was extended laterally, also. The front elevation, as well as the doors and windows were redesigned with a Georgian façade. Sixteen pane, sash windows, and an above ground floor verandah were added. There is a stone, spiral staircase. The house was restored by the Keating sisters in 1939, with advice from Clough Williams-Ellis (who designed and built Portmeirion village), which included removal of the ca. 1816 Regency style stucco to reveal the original grey stone walls.

There are several Grade II listed buildings on the estate, such as the cartshed which was listed in 1971, including the manor house and the detached cottage. There is also a summerhouse and a tool shed. An old mill next to a stream was granted Royal permission to grind its own corn.

== Grounds ==
Garden

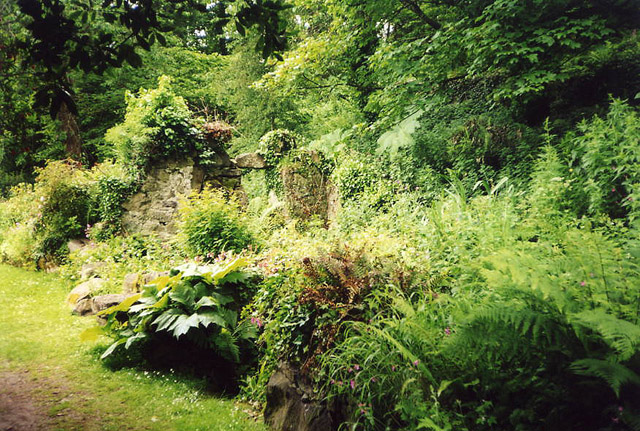
Ruined watermill in the garden

Set away from prevailing winds and benefiting from the microclimate, the garden lies below the house and is terraced into the slope, divided by hedges into several small compartments. There are native and cultivated plants in the garden. In spring and summer, there are displays of snowdrops and bluebells. Rhododendrons, azaleas, and magnolias are also part of the garden setting. The garden is accessible via grass paths and cobbled paths. Stone gateposts and seats, as well as old, unused buildings, and parterres are included in the landscaping. The parterre is referred to as Lady Strickland's Garden. A slate plaque is situated outside the entrance to the garden and contains an epitaph.

The earliest known planting plan was developed in 1966 by Mildred Eldridge, an artist and the wife of poet R. S. Thomas. This was followed in 1994 when an improved plan was drawn by the garden designer John Hubbard.

Woodlands

After the manor house, gardens and over 400 acres of countryside were given to the National Trust, the Trust added 150 acres (61 ha) of surrounding woodland that includes a Snowdrop Wood (Oxalis magellanica).

== See also ==
- List of gardens in Wales
