= Philip Yorke =

Philip Yorke may refer to:

- Philip Yorke, 1st Earl of Hardwicke (1690–1764), English lawyer and politician
- Philip Yorke, 2nd Earl of Hardwicke (1720–1790), English politician
- Philip Yorke, 3rd Earl of Hardwicke (1757–1834), English politician
- Philip Yorke, Viscount Royston (1784–1808), English politician, eldest son of Philip Yorke, 3rd Earl of Hardwicke
- Philip Yorke (antiquary) (1743–1804), English scholar of Welsh history and genealogy
- Philip James Yorke (1799–1874), British Army officer, scientist and Fellow of the Royal Society
- Philip Scott Yorke (1905–1978), last Squire of Erddig
