= Rhodri =

Rhodri (English: /ˈrɒdri/; Welsh: [ˈr̥ɔdrɪ]) is a masculine first name of Welsh origin. It is derived from the elements rhod "wheel" and rhi "king".

It may refer to the following people:

- Rhodri Molwynog ap Idwal (690–754), Welsh king of Gwynedd (720–754)
- Rhodri Mawr ap Merfyn (820–878), Welsh king of Gwynedd (844–878), king of Powys (855–878), king of Seisyllwg (872–878)
- Rhodri ap Hyfaidd (845–905), Welsh king of Dyfed (904–905)
- Rhodri ap Hywel (died 953), Welsh king of Deheubarth (950–953)
- Rhodri ab Owain Gwynedd (c. 1147–1195), Welsh prince of part of Gwynedd (1175–1195)
- Rhodri ap Gruffudd (1230–1315), Welsh prince
- Rhodri Morgan (1939–2017), Welsh politician, First Minister of Wales 2000–2009
- Rhodri Glyn Thomas (born 1953), Welsh politician
- Rhodri Thompson (born 1960), British lawyer
- Rhodri Philipps (born 1966), British peer
- Rhod Gilbert (born 1968), Welsh comedian and presenter
- Rhodri Williams (born 1968), Welsh sports journalist
- Rhodri Davies (musician) (born 1971), improvisational harpist
- Rhodri Marsden (born 1971), British writer and musician
- Rhodri Owen (born 1972), Welsh television presenter
- Rhodri Meilir (born 1978), Welsh actor
- Rhodri Smith (born 1982), Welsh scientist
- Rhodri Gomer-Davies (born 1983), Welsh rugby player
- Rhodri McAtee (born 1984), Welsh rugby player
- Rhodri Jones (born 1991), Welsh rugby player
- Rhodri Smith (footballer) (born 2006), Swiss footballer
