= Erddig =

Country house and estate in Wrexham, North Wales

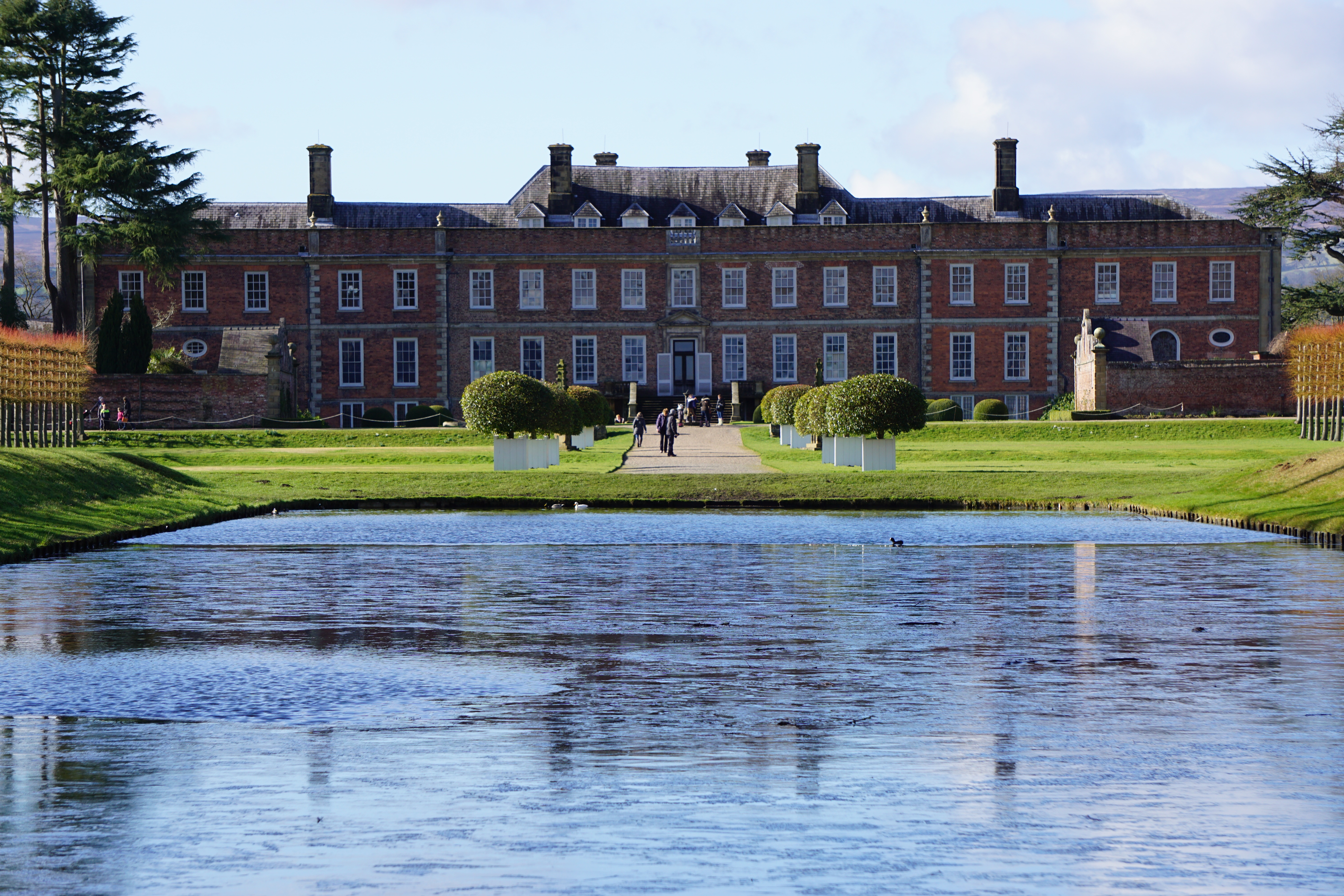
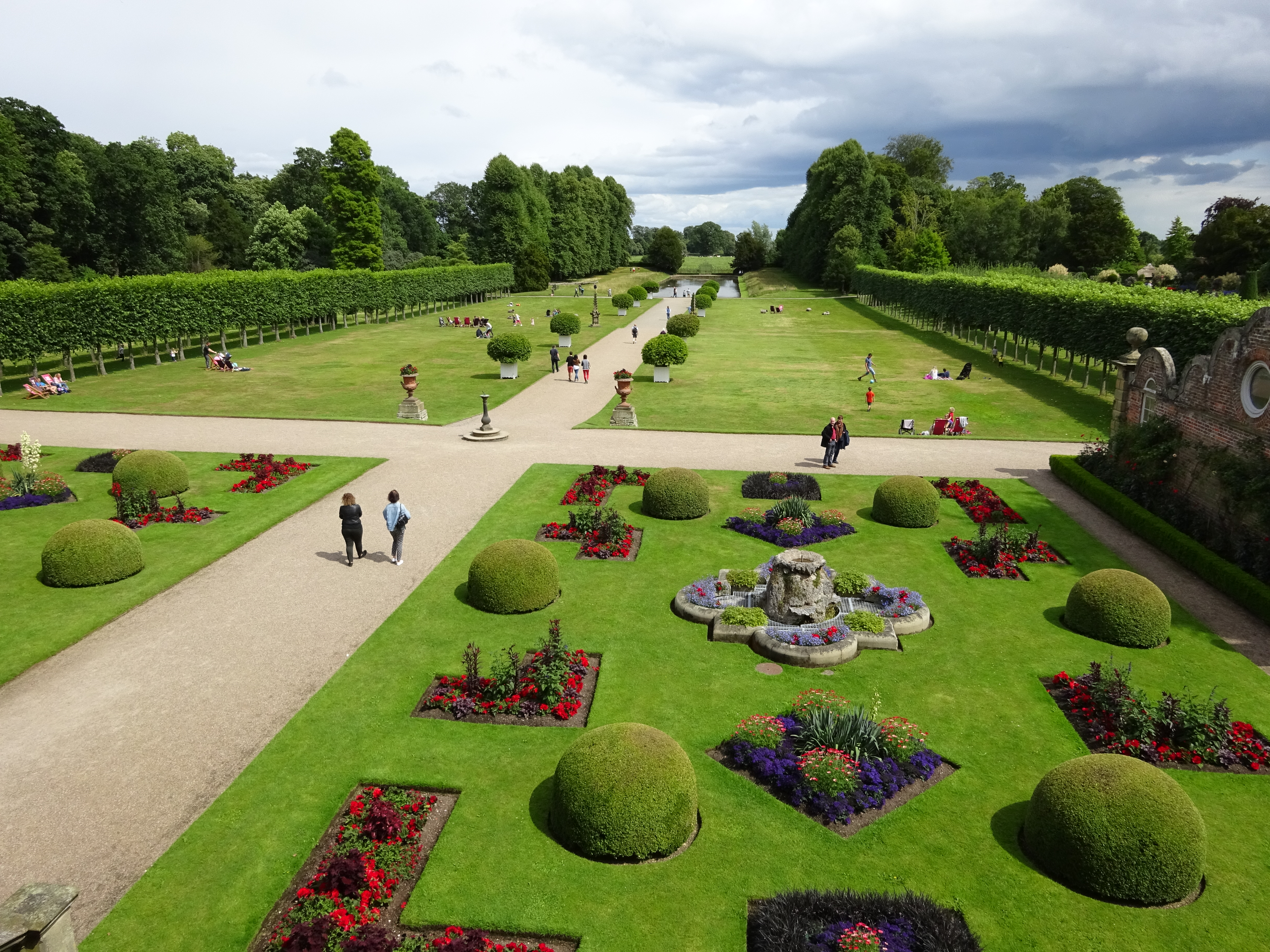
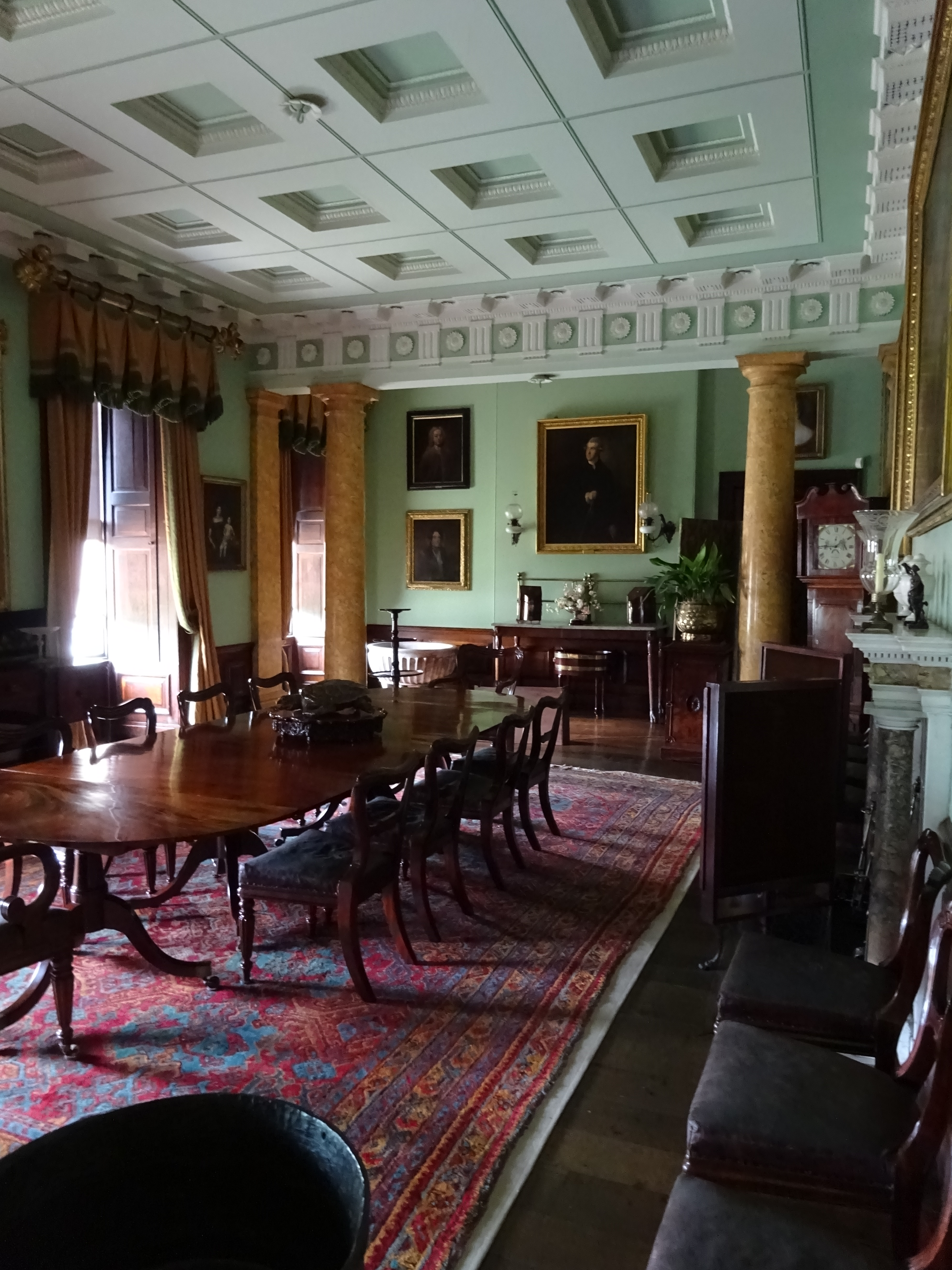
- The house and lake (top), gardens, and interior.

- Location within Wrexham

General information
- Location: Marchwiel, Wrexham County Borough, Wales
- Coordinates: 53°1′38″N 3°0′23″W
- Owner: National Trust

Website
- https://www.nationaltrust.org.uk/erddig

Listed Building – Grade I
- Designated: 9 June 1952
- Reference no.: 27130

Erddig (Welsh pronunciation: [ˈɛrðɪɡ]) is a country house and estate in the community of Marchwiel, approximately 2 miles (3.2 km) south of Wrexham, Wales. It is centred on a country house which dates principally from between 1684 and 1687, when the central block was built by Joshua Edisbury, and the 1720s, when the flanking wings were added by its second owner, John Meller. Erddig was inherited by Simon Yorke in 1733, and remained in the Yorke family until it was given to the National Trust by Philip Scott Yorke in 1973.

The Yorke family had an unusual relationship with their servants, and commemorated them in a large and unique collection of portraits and poems. This collection, and the good state of preservation of the servants' quarters and estate workshops, provide an insight into how servants lived between the eighteenth and twentieth centuries. The house is also significant for its collection of seventeenth-century furniture; this includes the state bed, a rare surviving example of a lit à la duchesse canopy bed which retains its original hangings and bed cover of silk satin embroidered with Chinese designs. The house was designated a grade I listed building in 1952.

The gardens were laid out between 1718 and 1733, and the surrounding park was landscaped between 1767 and 1789. The estate is approximately 1,900 acres (770 ha) in size, and includes part of Wat's Dyke and the remains of a motte-and-bailed castle of the Norman period. A pair of gates, originally located at Stansty Park and attributed to Robert Davies, stand at the end of the garden canal.

== History ==
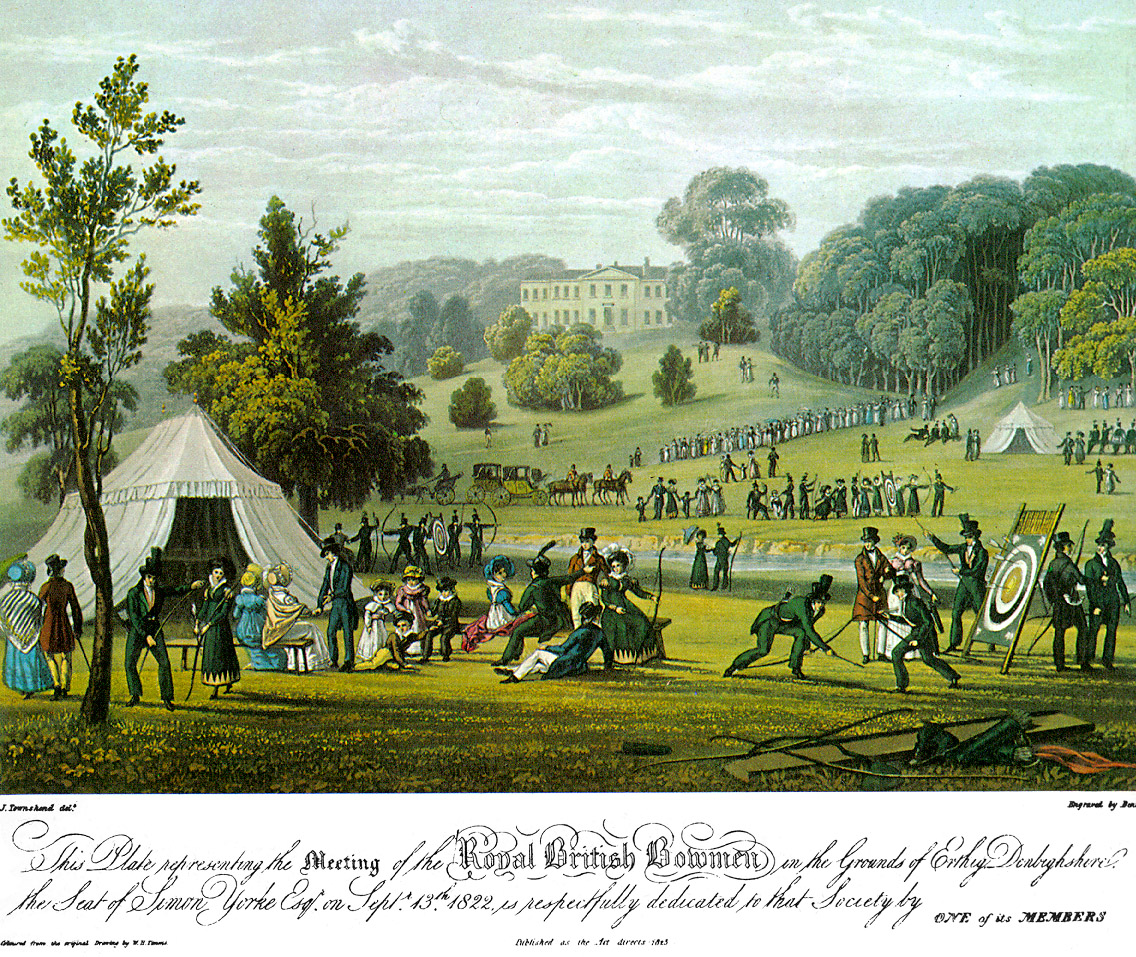
A print of the 1822 meeting at Erddig of the "Royal British Bowmen" archery club (1823 print engraved after J. Townshend)

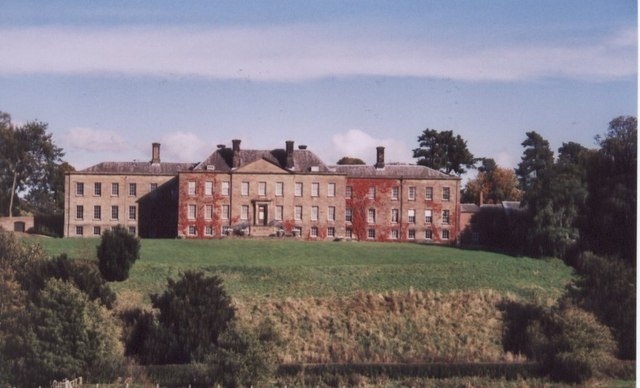
Erddig Hall, west front

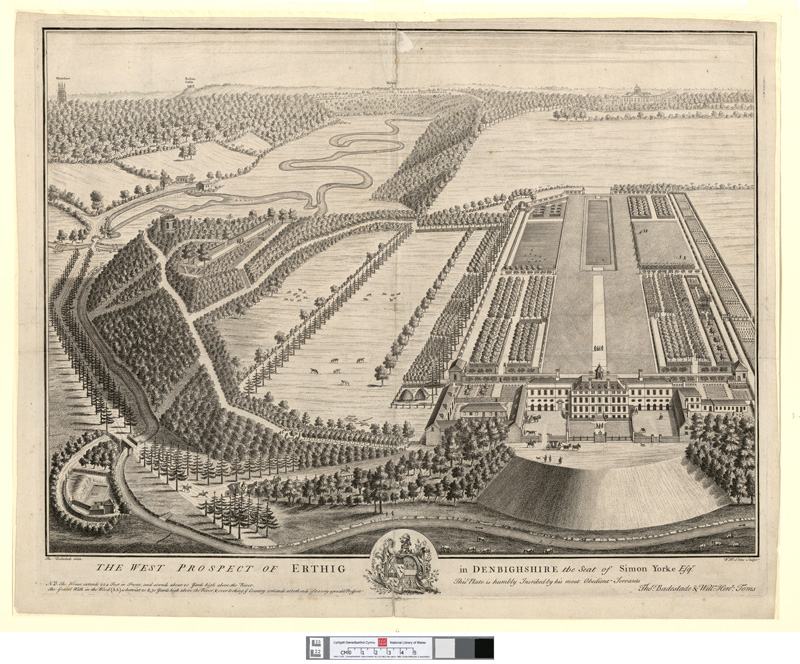
West prospect of Erddig

A section of Wat's Dyke approximately 1,500 metres (4,900 ft) long runs north to south through the park, to the west of the house. It consists of a bank up to 2 metres (6.6 ft) high and a ditch to its west, and was probably built in the eighth century by Æthelbald of Mercia to mark the boundary between his kingdom and the Kingdom of Powys.

Part of Wat's Dyke is incorporated into a Norman motte-and-bailey castle, called "Wristleham" in a pipe roll dated to 1161, which is located within the park on a bluff above the confluence of the Black Brook and River Clywedog. The site is approximately 200 square metres (240 sq yd) and consists of a bailey of approximately 90 square metres (110 sq yd) to the south and a slightly higher motte to the north, the two separated by a man-made ditch. The bailey is protected by the promontory to the east and west, and by another man-made ditch to the south. No visible masonry remains. The castle was probably established soon after the Norman Conquest, but became redundant as the border between England and Gwynedd moved westward toward Ruthin and Denbigh.

The original house was built on the escarpment above the Clywedog between 1684 and 1689 to the designs of Thomas Webb for Joshua Edisbury of Pentre Clawdd, High Sheriff of Denbighshire. Joshua Edisbury was forced to borrow large sums to fund the project, which resulted in his bankruptcy and, in 1716, forced him to sell Erddig. John Meller, Master of the Chancery, bought the mortgage on Erddig from Sir John Trevor.

John Meller refurbished and enlarged the house (including adding two wings in the 1720s). A staunch supporter of the royal House of Hanover, he treated his neighbours with suspicion in what was a strongly Jacobite locality. On his death in 1733, unmarried and childless, he passed it to his nephew, Simon Yorke (d. 1767) (first cousin of Philip Yorke, 1st Earl of Hardwicke) thereby establishing an unbroken line of ownership to last for almost 250 years.

In 1771, Philip Yorke I began a programme of alterations to the main house including the facing the west front with stone and moving the bedrooms from the ground floor to the first floor. He was the author of the Royal Tribes of Wales and there is a room in Erddig which features the coats of arms of the chief North Wales families.

In 1861 General John Yorke (1814–1890) became the owner of Plas Newydd in Llangollen, the home of the famous Ladies of Llangollen.

The estate began to decline following the death of Philp Yorke II in 1922 as income diminished and staff were laid off. The house began to decay under his successor, Simon Yorke IV, who became reclusive and failed to install electricity, running water, gas or a phone. Whilst causing damage to the property, this period of neglect ensured that Erddig remained remarkably unaltered.

In March 1973, the last squire Philip Scott Yorke, a bachelor, gave Erddig to the National Trust. This followed the collapse several years earlier of a shaft from the nearby coal mine (Bersham colliery) under the house, causing subsidence of 5 feet (1.5 m), which seriously affected the structural security of the house to the extent that, without suitable underpinning, it would have become a ruin. It was strengthened using the compensation of £120,000 the National Trust was able to extract from the National Coal Board. 63 acres (25 ha) of Erddig Park (out of view of the house) was subsequently sold for £995,000 and this paid for the restoration work on the house. The restoration was completed on 27 June 1977 when Charles, Prince of Wales officially opened Erddig to the public, joking that it was the first time in his, albeit short, life that he had opened something that was already 300 years old.

=== List of Yorke Squires ===
- Simon Yorke I (1696-1767), cousin of Philip Yorke, 1st Earl Of Hardwicke, maternal nephew of John Mellor, married Dorothy Hutton (d1787)
- Philip Yorke I (1743-1804), son of Simon Yorke I and his wife Dorothy Hutton, married Elizabeth Cust (1750-1779) and later Diana Wynne (d1805)
- Simon Yorke II (1771-1834), son of Philip Yorke I and his first wife Elizabeth Cust, married Margaret Holland (1778-1848)
- Simon Yorke III (1811-1894), son of Simon Yorke II and his wife Margaret Holland, married Victoria Cust (1824-1895)
- Philip Yorke II (1849-1922), son of Simon Yorke III and his wife Victoria Cust, married Annette Fountayne (d1899), and later Louisa Matilda Scott (1863-1951)
- Simon Yorke IV (1903-1966), son of Philip Yorke II and his second wife Louisa Matilda Scott, died unmarried
- Philip Yorke III (1905-1978), brother of Simon Yorke IV. died unmarried

Many of the Yorke family have memorials in the church of Saint Deiniol at Marchwiel.

One of the main streets of Wrexham city Centre, Yorke Street, is named after the family and the Squire Yorke public house in the city is named after Philip Yorke III.

== House ==
The central block of Erddig Hall is the earliest part of the building and dates from 1683–c. 1687, when Joshua Edisbury commissioned Thomas Webb to design a new house. It was extended c. 1721 – c. 1724, under the ownership of Thomas Meller, through the addition of side wings. In 1772–3, Simon Yorke encased the west, entrance front in ashlar stonework and had the service wings which flanked the entrance demolished; they were replaced by a new service wing to the south, completed in 1774.

A tour of the house, which starts "below stairs", tells of the Yorke family's unusually high regard for their servants and, through a collection of portraits, photographs and verses (a family tradition started by Simon's son Philip Yorke (1743–1804), provides a record of the people who lived and worked on the estate. In the staterooms "above stairs" there is a fine collection of 18th century furniture and antiquities. Many of these originally belonged to John Meller. One notable work of art includes a portrait in the Music Room of Judge Jeffreys, the "Hanging Judge".

The Yorke family seemingly never threw anything away and the house now has a unique collection ranging from the rare and magnificent (including some Chinese wallpaper in the State Bedroom) to the ordinary and everyday: one of the conditions that the last Squire, Philip S. Yorke (1905–1978) imposed on handing over the house and estate to the National Trust in 1973 was that nothing was to be removed from the house. He is quoted as saying: "My only interest for many years has been that this unique establishment for which my family have foregone many luxuries and comforts over seven generations should now be dedicated to the enjoyment of all those who may come here and see a part of our national heritage preserved for all foreseeable time."

== Gardens ==
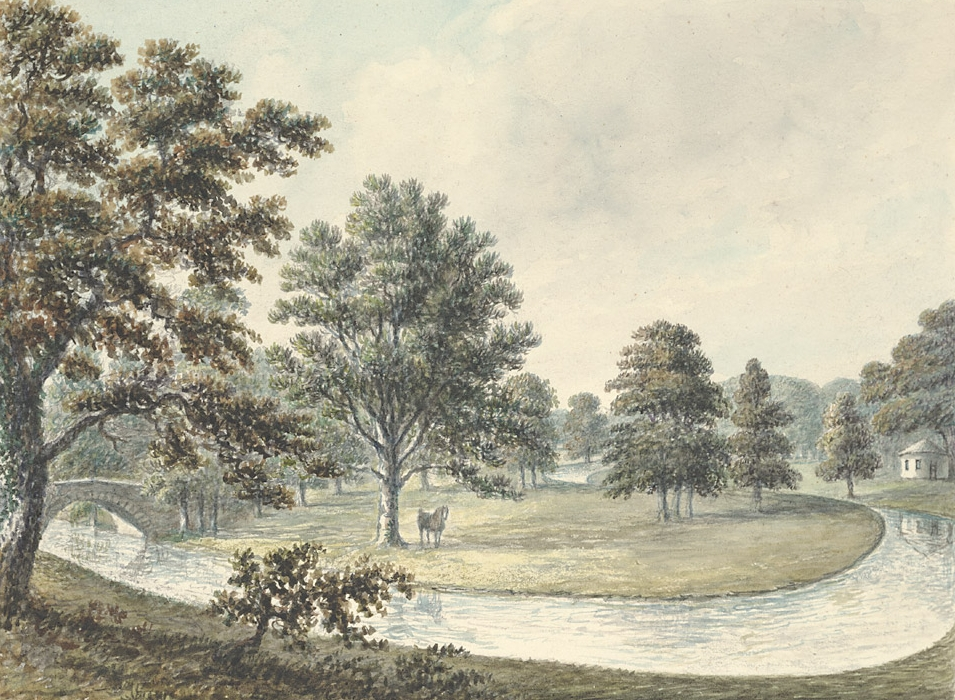
View in grounds of Erddig, 1794

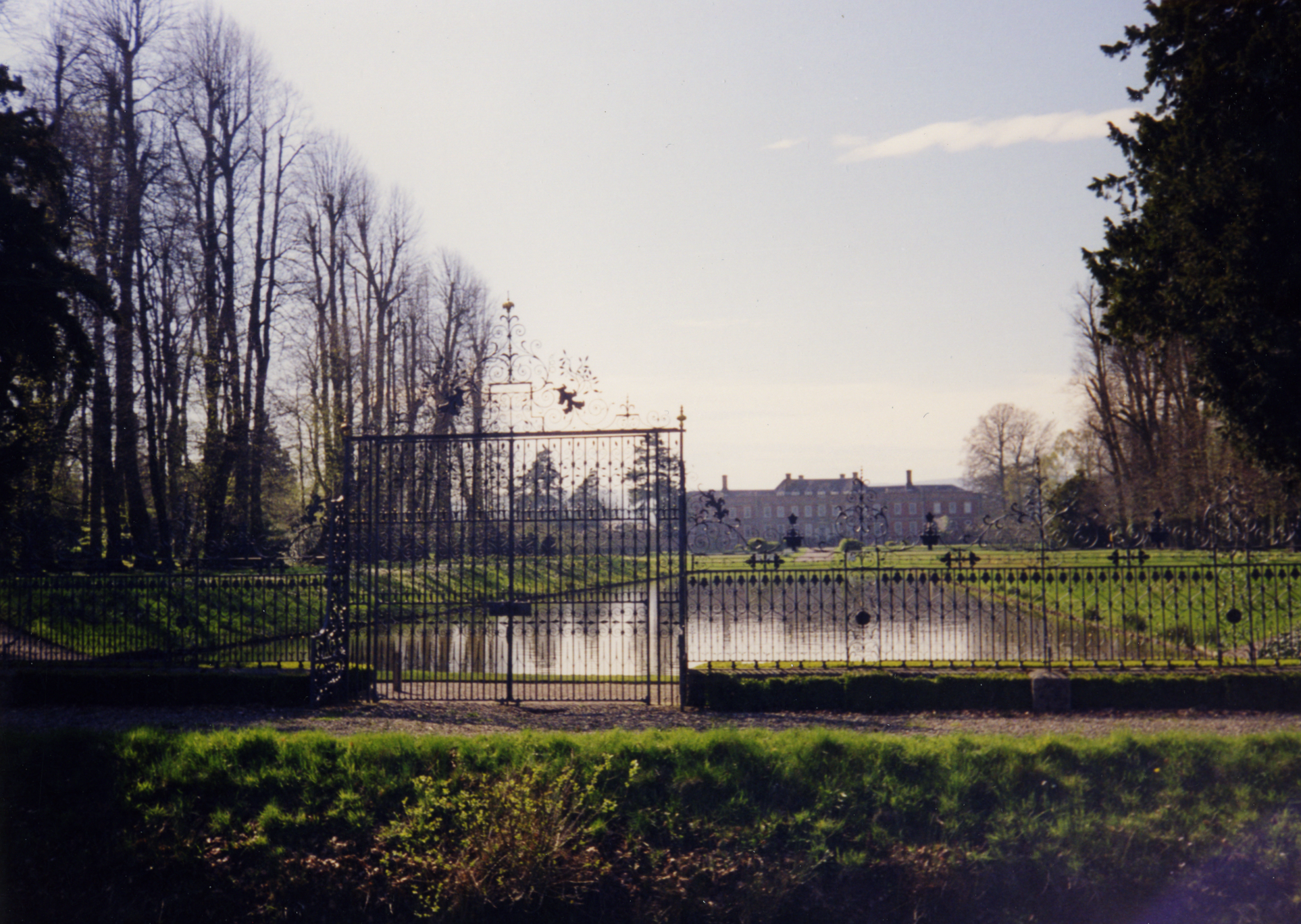
Gates made by the Davies brothers for Stansty Park, moved to Erddig in 1908

Erddig's walled garden is one of the most important surviving 18th century formal gardens in Britain. They contain rare fruit trees, a canal, a pond, and a Victorian parterre. Around a hundred cultivars of Hedera (ivy) are accredited with Plant Heritage as a National Plant Collection.

There is also a fine example of gates and railings made by ironsmiths the Davies brothers, of nearby Bersham, for Stansty Park; the gates were moved to Erddig in 1908. The arrangement of alcoves in the yew hedges in the formal gardens may be a form of bee bole.

The 486-hectare (1,200-acre) landscape pleasure park was designed by William Emes.

Emes' landscaping work involved the removal of a section of Wat's Dyke near the house. In 2018 this was excavated by the Clwyd-Powys Archaeological Trust who found that most of the ditch and some of the bank of this linear earthwork survived intact.

The parks and gardens are listed as Grade I in the Cadw/ICOMOS Register of Parks and Gardens of Special Historic Interest in Wales.

== Estate buildings ==
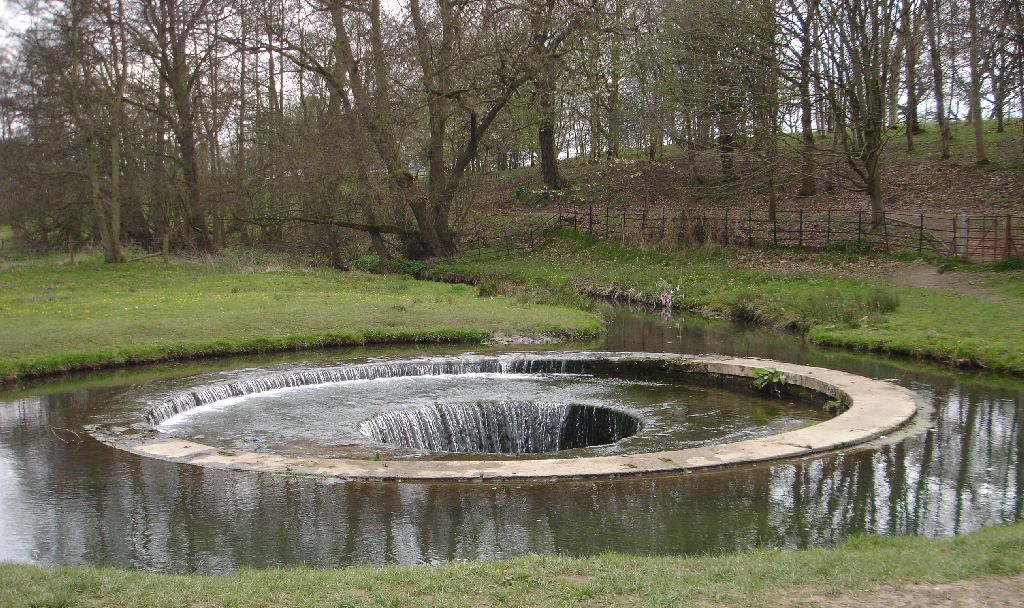
Erddig's 'Cup and Saucer'

The estate buildings include the joiners' shop and smithy, the Midden Yard (with its saw mill and cart sheds), and the Stable Yard (with its stables and tack room, carriages and vintage bicycles and vintage cars). In the house are the laundry, bakehouse, kitchen and scullery.

The nearby river supplied a source of water, which was pumped uphill by a hydraulic ram, the water entering the ram via a feature known as Erddig's Cup and Saucer.

Whilst occupied by the Yorke family the house was never installed with mains electricity, with the last Squire, Philip, relying on a portable generator to power his single television set. The saw mill, however, was equipped with its own static steam engine to provide the power for sawing and turning.

== Awards ==
In 2003, Erddig was voted by readers of the Radio Times and viewers of the Channel 5 television series Britain's Finest Stately Homes as "Britain's second finest". In September 2007 it was voted the UK's "favourite Historic House" and the "8th most popular historic site" in the UK by Britain's Best. Erddig was awarded National Heritage Museum of the Year in 1978, a joint award with the Museum of London.

== See also ==
- List of gardens in Wales

== Bibliography ==
- Belford, Paul (2019). "Hidden Earthworks: Excavation and Protection of Offa's and Wat's Dykes". Offa's Dyke Journal. 1 (1): 80. doi:10.23914/odj.v1i0.251. S2CID 213817061.
- Griffiths, Eric (1995). Philip Yorke I (1743–1804), Squire of Erthig. Bridge Books. ISBN 1-872424-47-3.
- Veysey, Geoffrey (2005). Philip Yorke, Last Squire of Erddig. Bridge Books. ISBN 1-872-42421-X.
- Waterson, Merlin (1980). The Servant's Hall. Pantheon Books. ISBN 0-394-50903-X.

== Sources ==
- Cadw. "Erdigg Hall (27130)". National Historic Assets of Wales.
- Garnett, Oliver (1995). Erddig. National Trust. ISBN 9781843590170.
- "Get the Downton experience at Erddig". National Trust.
- "Britain's Great Outdoors – And Indoors With Castles, Homes & Lively Markets". Canadian Traveller.
- Cadw. "Erddig Hall Garden (86570)". National Historic Assets of Wales.
- Cadw. "Erddig Park (700357)". National Historic Assets of Wales.
- Cadw. "Erddig Castle (307144)". National Historic Assets of Wales.
- Cadw. "Wat's Dyke: Section Extending Through Erddig Park (275773)". National Historic Assets of Wales.
- Cadw. "Erddig Park, Stansty Gates (27133)". National Historic Assets of Wales.
- Wrexham County Borough Council. "Famous People: The Yorke Family - WCBC". old.wrexham.gov.uk.
- Breverton, Terry, 1946- (2010). Wales's 1000 best heritage sites. Amberley. ISBN 978-1-84868-991-6. OCLC 619653813.
- Williams, W. Alister. (2010). The encyclopaedia of Wrexham. Bridge Books. ISBN 978-1-84494-067-7. OCLC 700511490.
- Jones, Nigel R. (2005). Architecture of England, Scotland, and Wales. Greenwood Press. ISBN 9780313318504. OCLC 1090043661.
- Wrexham County Borough Council. "Famous People: The Yorke Family - WCBC". old.wrexham.gov.uk.
- Guides, Rough (1 March 2018). The Rough Guide to Wales (Travel Guide eBook). Apa Publications (UK) Limited. ISBN 978-1-78919-940-6.
- "Erddig House and Gardens, near Wrexham & hotels - Great British Gardens". www.greatbritishgardens.co.uk.
- "National Trust - Erddig Hall". Plant Heritage.
- Belford, Paul (2019). "Hidden Earthworks: Excavation and Protection of Offa's and Wat's Dykes". Offa's Dyke Journal. 1 (1): 80. doi:10.23914/odj.v1i0.251. S2CID 213817061.
- Veysey, Geoffrey (2005). Philip Yorke, Last Squire of Erddig. Bridge Books. ISBN 1-872-42421-X.
- Cadw. "Erddig (PGW(C)62(WRE))". National Historic Assets of Wales.
- Veysey, Geoffrey (2005). Philip Yorke, Last Squire of Erddig. Bridge Books. ISBN 1-872-42421-X.
- "Erddig House and Gardens: Wales UK Holiday News". Wales.info.
- "Stately home is public winner". 2 July 2003.
- "Britain's Best 2007: The winners". UKTV. 29 March 2007. Archived from the original on 18 November 2007.
- "Awards and Winners" (PDF), National Heritage, National Heritage
- Hubbard, Edward (1984). Clwyd: (Denbighshire and Flintshire). The Buildings of Wales. Frome and London: Penguin Books, University of Wales Press. pp. 160–163.
- "Wat's Dyke: Section Extending Through Erddig Park (275773)". Coflein. RCAHMW.
- "Erddig, Castle (307144)". Coflein. RCAHMW.
