= Cestyll Garden =

Secluded garden in Anglesey, Wales

Coordinates: 53.4105°N 4.4910°W

Cestyll Garden is a secluded garden with picturesque sea views near Cemaes on the north west coast of the island of Anglesey in North Wales, United Kingdom. The garden is listed as Grade II on the Cadw/ICOMOS Register of Parks and Gardens of Special Historic Interest in Wales.

== History ==
It was once home to the Hon. Violet Vivian, who began transforming the rugged landscape into a fine garden in 1922.

== Attractions ==
With an interesting range of plants, the garden is at its best in late May. There are, among others, white rhododendrons, Japanese Maple, yellow Witch Hazel and Azaleas. The garden is open to the general public during the Spring Bank Holiday, and may be visited by special arrangement by contacting the present owners at the nearby Wylfa Nuclear Power Station.

== See also ==
- List of gardens in Wales
