= Colby Woodland Garden =

Historic garden in Wales

Coordinates: 51.7401°N 4.6706°W

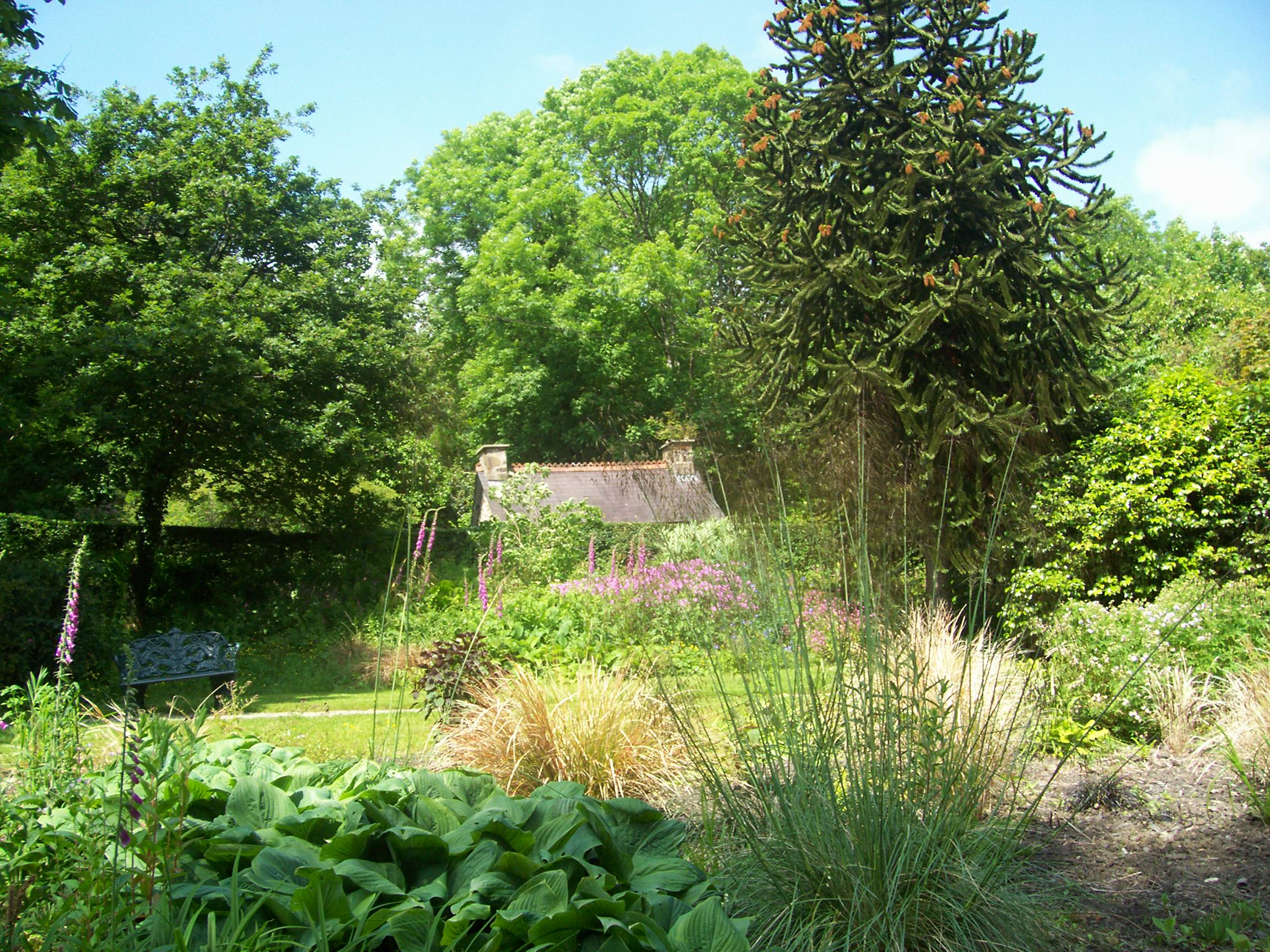

Colby Woodland Garden (Welsh: Gardd Goedwig Colby) is a National Trust woodland garden in a secluded valley, approximately ¾ of a mile north of Amroth in Pembrokeshire, Wales. It is listed on the Cadw/ICOMOS Register of Parks and Gardens of Special Historic Interest in Wales.

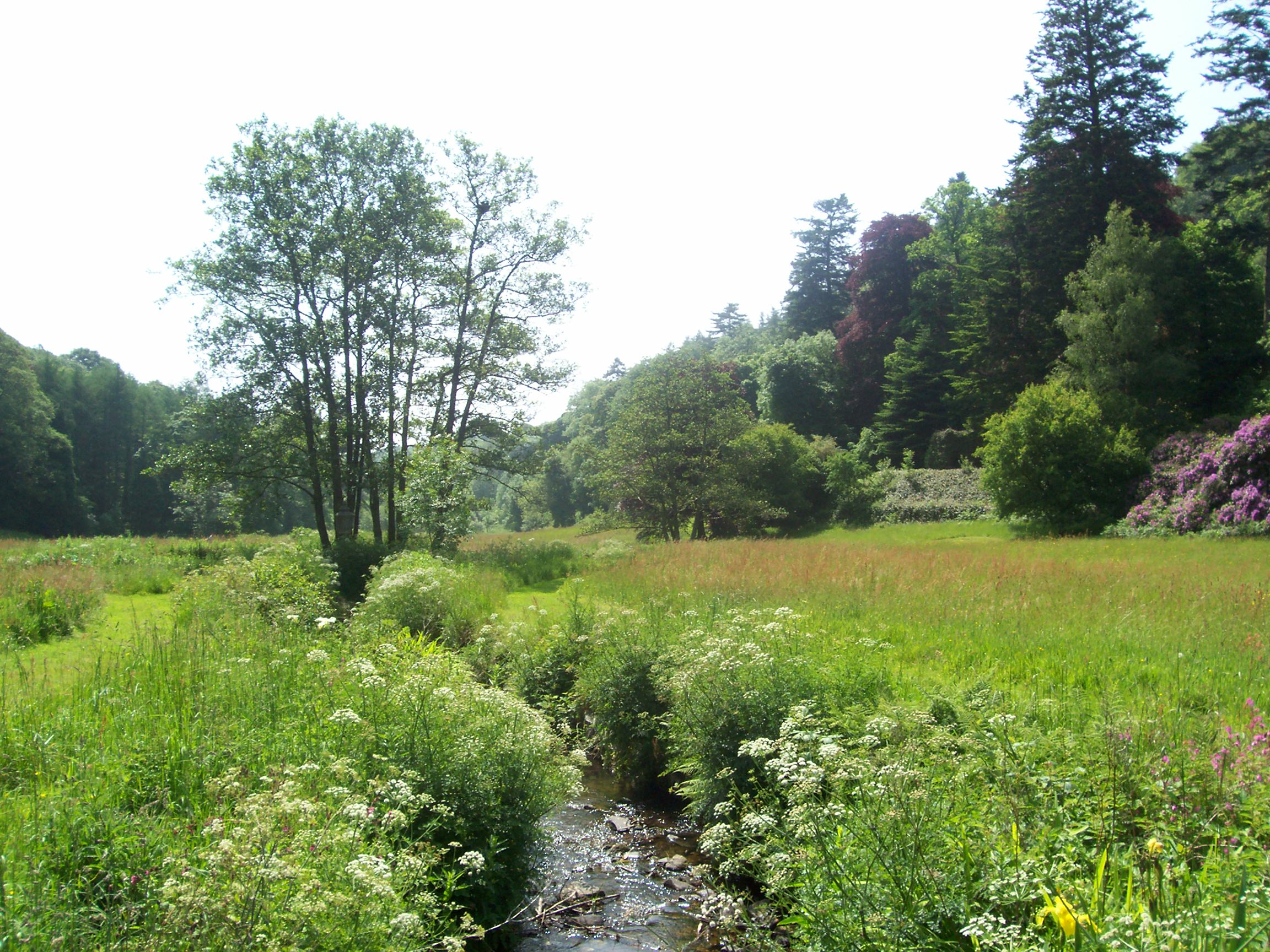
View of the Brook running through The Meadow

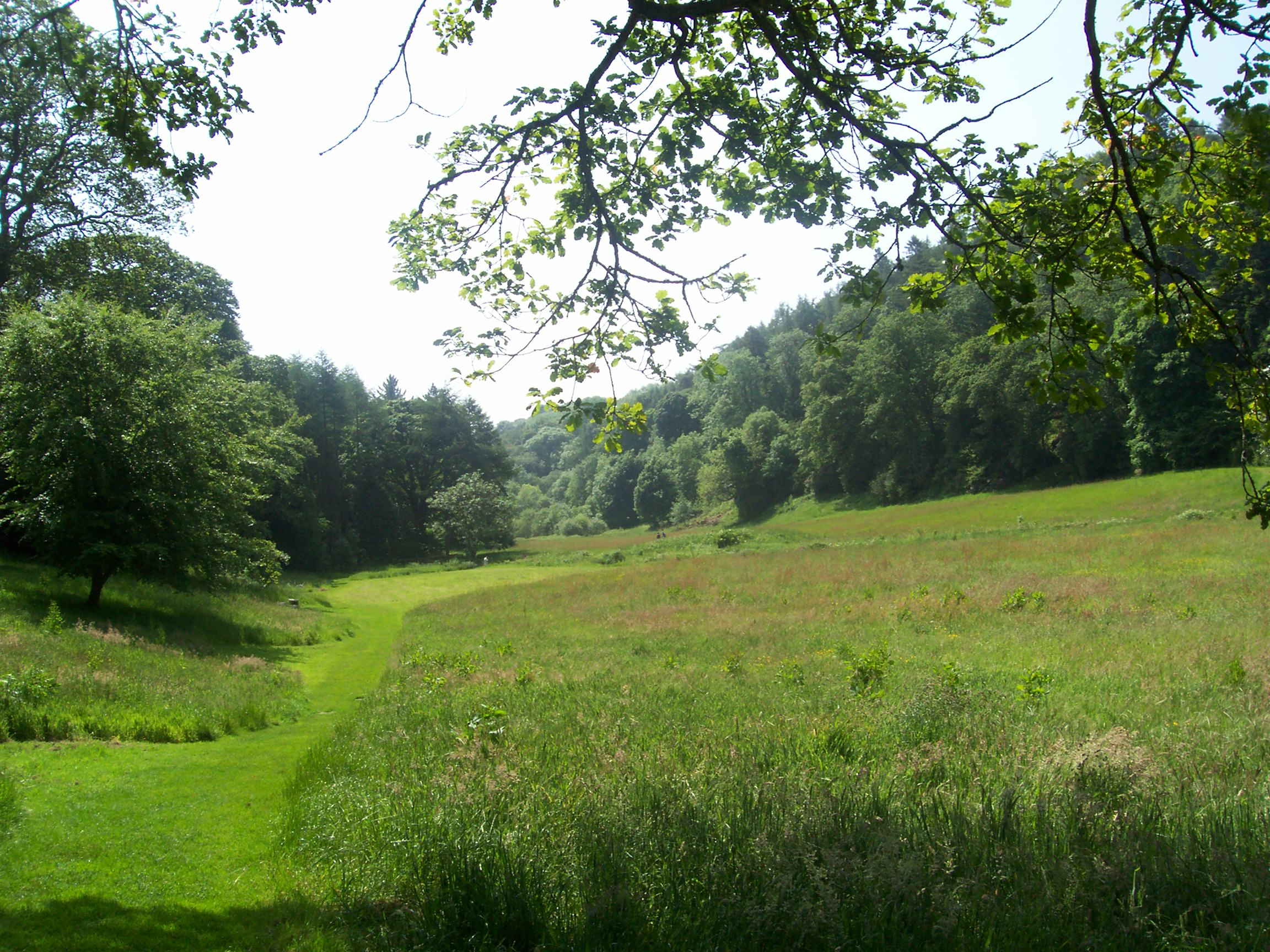
The Meadow

== History ==
The origin of the estate was the 18th century Rhydlangoed farmhouse, which was expanded by the Colby family, Pembrokeshire coal mine owners, to create Colby Lodge in 1803. There were further alterations and changes of ownership until the property was bought by the Kay family in the 1870s. The woodland gardens were mainly created by Colonel and Mrs Crosland (nee Kay) in the early 20th century. They are listed at Grade II on the Cadw/ICOMOS Register of Parks and Gardens of Special Historic Interest in Wales.

Elidyr Mason, niece of Mrs Crosland, inherited the property. The house and walled garden were sold to Pamela and Peter Chance in 1965, with Mason retaining the woodland garden and the rest of the estate. On Mason's death in 1979, her portion of the estate was left to the National Trust. The Chances also transferred ownership of the house and walled garden to the National Trust in 1979, reuniting the two parts of the estate.

== Extent ==
The woodland, meadow and walled gardens are approximately 8 acres (3.2 ha) with plants such as azaleas, bluebells, camellias, daffodils, magnolias and rhododendrons, along with wildflowers in the meadow.

== Amenities ==
There is a second-hand bookshop, tearoom, gallery and toilets. Varied events take place during the year, including family games. The house, Colby Lodge, is not open for public viewing, but provides serviced accommodation. National Trust Holidays have three self-catering properties in the area.

== See also ==
- National Trust
- List of gardens in Wales
