= Llanfaethlu =

Village and community in Anglesey, Wales

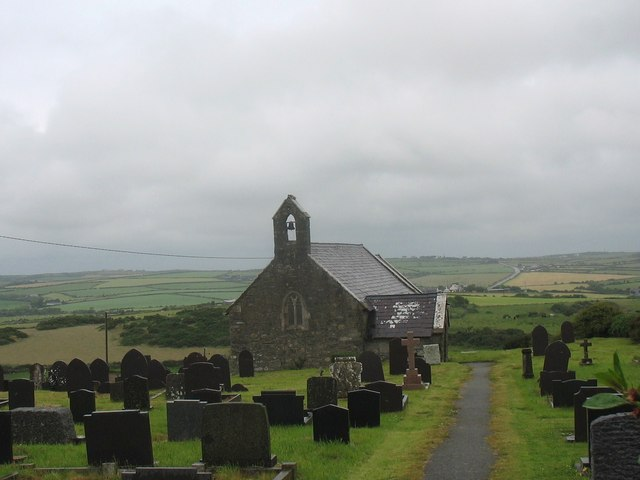
- Church of Saint Maethlu, Llanfaethlu

- Location within Anglesey
- Population: 553 (2011)
- Principal area: Anglesey
- Preserved county: Gwynedd
- Country: Wales
- Sovereign state: United Kingdom
- Post town: Holyhead
- Postcode district: LL65
- Dialling code: 01407
- Police: North Wales
- Fire: North Wales
- Ambulance: Welsh
- UK Parliament: Ynys Môn
- Senedd Cymru – Welsh Parliament: Bangor Conwy Môn
- List of places UK Wales Anglesey 53.3534°N 4.5370°W Map of the community

Llanfaethlu is a village and community in the north west of Anglesey, in north-west Wales. The community population taken at the 2011 Census was 553. The village takes its name from the Church of Saint Maethlu. The community includes Llanfwrog.

== History ==
There are two prehistoric scheduled monuments within Llanfaethlu Community. A hill fort with a single bank and ditch lies on a headland near the coastal hamlet of Tre-Fadog, overlooking the sandy bay of Port Trefadog. To the east of the village is the Capel Soar Standing Stone, a large and prominent standing stone visible from the A5025 and close to Soar Baptist Chapel. It is a slab, 3.2 metres (10 ft) high, and 1.7 metres (5.6 ft) wide at its base, tapering to a rounded top. Roman activity was shown by a small hoard of Roman coins, found in 1929 on a hill to the west of the church, some having been minted when Domitian was emperor, around 90 AD.

The village is built around the Church of Saint Maethlu. This church is dedicated to Maethlu the Confessor who is thought to have founded an early Christian religious establishment about three quarters of a mile to the south of the present building. Two other early Christian burial sites have been found close by, at Hen Siop and at the lodge of Carreglwyd.

In the early nineteenth century, Llanfaethlu was the site of a telegraph station, part of a chain of such stations designed to pass information about the movement of ships between Liverpool and Holyhead. The operation started in 1827 and the signals were at first made using flag semaphore, meaning that they could be obstructed in adverse weather conditions. The visual system was replaced by an electric telegraph later in the century.

Llanfaethlu is home to Condessa, a small liquor company that manufactures specialist liqueurs which include Welsh cream liqueur, praline cream liqueur, black cherry liqueur and sloe gin.

Carreglwyd, a Georgian house and country estate, is to the northwest of the village. The house became a Grade II* listed building in 1952 on the basis that it is "a fine small-scale country house of simple Georgian character". It has "an especially fine hall, the core of the C17 house being retained through subsequent remodelling.".

Map of Llanfaethlu community, Isle of Anglesey, Wales

== Governance ==
There is an electoral ward of the same name: it includes the neighbouring communities of Llanfachraeth and the southern half of Cylch-y-Garn, and has a population that totalled 1,648 at the 2011 census.

== Shipwrecks ==
The coast of Anglesey was a hazardous place for sailing ships, and many wrecks have gone down on and around the shoreline. The Llanfaethlu coast includes the known or presumed resting places of at least 16 named wrecks:

The Elizabeth was a wooden schooner from Whitehaven, wrecked at Porth Penrhyn-mawr. As described in the Holyhead lifeboat station logbook, "The schooner was caught in Holyhead roads by the hurricane that blew over the night of 3-4 December 1863. The Holyhead lifeboat was launched and brought off the crew including the master John Greenlaw. The lifeboat was taken out by harbour men and pilots, after the regular crew declined to go. The lifeboat rescued 43 men from 3 other[s] vessels. The total number of vessels wrecked that night between Peniel beach and Clipperau Point was 15."

The Grace Phillips was a 74 feet (23 m) wooden schooner built in 1863 owned by T Morgan & Co of Amlwch. On 25 February 1898, on passage from Milford Haven to Caernarfon, it was caught in a force 8 gale and was blown ashore in Porth Tywyn-mawr.

The Dagmar was a 122 feet (37 m) wooden barque built in 1854. On 9 December 1886 it was bringing timber from New Brunswick, Canada, to Liverpool. A force 10 gale blew it onshore and it was wrecked at Porth Tywyn Mawr. The Coxswain of the Holyhead lifeboat received a silver medal for saving the crew of the Dagmar plus crews from three other vessels, all on the same day (21 lives saved in total).

Town Of Wexford was a sailing vessel (possibly also with a steam engine) running the mail service between Holyhead and Dublin. Under the command of master Murphy, it ran ashore at Porth Trefadog on 4 January 1852. The Holyhead lifeboat was towed out to the wreck by a rival paddle-steamer and through several trips was able to save 43 lives.

The Hypatia was a 170 feet (52 m) wooden barque built in 1856 and registered at Skien, Norway. On 16 November 1888 it was carrying a cargo of timber from West Bay in Nova Scotia to Liverpool but became stranded on the beach south of Borthwen headland in a southwesterly force 8 gale. The captain and another man had landed by boat, but at high water the barque was blown stem on to the rocks. The Holyhead lifeboat was called out and Mr Williams, Chief Coastguard, was able to deploy their rocket apparatus to get a line out to the barque. The 13 men still on board were all landed safely with their baggage.

The United Friends was a wooden sloop built in 1828 which was wrecked while carrying coal and maize from Liverpool to Trefadog on 22 November 1877. It had nearly reached its destination when it was caught in a northwesterly force 9 near the Borthwen headland and blown onshore to become stranded.

Towards the southern end of Llanfaethlu's 5 miles (8 km) of coast is Creigiau Cliperau (Clipperau Point). Ships being driven south-west down the coast have been especially likely to be driven ashore against this headland. Vessels lost here include the Maeleta on 12 December 1883; the Penpoll on 17 November 1883; the Antelope, on 3 April 1886; the Alexandra on 9 February 1871; and on Penrhyn point, the Dale on 20 December 1824; the Alert on 10 February 1826; the Robert Mills on 27 February 1860; the Avondale on 9 December 1886; the Francis Griffiths on 11 November 1861; and the steamship Meath on 1 February 1892.

== Protected areas ==
The whole coastal strip of Llanfaethlu Community, along with the vast majority of Anglesey's coastline, lies within the Isle of Anglesey Area of Outstanding Natural Beauty. The AONB along this section is roughly 2 km wide, and runs up to the outskirts of both Llanfaethlu village and Llanfwrog. Some 6km of the 200-kilometre (124 mi) Anglesey Coastal Path runs along the length of Llanfaethlu's coastline.

An area of mire and fen known as Llyn Garreg-lwyd is designated a Site of Special Scientific Interest (SSSI), due to its wetland plants and associated breeding birds. It includes one of the largest reedbeds on Anglesey. The SSSI covers 17.7 hectares (44 acres) in the valley to the north-east of Carreglwyd house. The site straddles the boundary between Llanfaethlu and Cylch-y-Garn Communities. It is best viewed from the road towards Rhydwyn, which runs along its eastern edge.
