= Simon Yorke (1903–1966) =

Welsh landowner

Simon Yorke (24 June 1903 – 7 May 1966) was a Welsh landowner and soldier. He was born in Erddig, Denbighshire, the eldest son of Philip Yorke (1849–1922), and Louisa Matilda Yorke (née Scott). He inherited the Erddig estate in 1922. He was High Sheriff for Denbighshire in 1937. He was a lieutenant in the Denbighshire Yeomanry and enlisted as a private in the North Staffordshire Regiment during World War II. Many of his Still Life paintings are in the house.

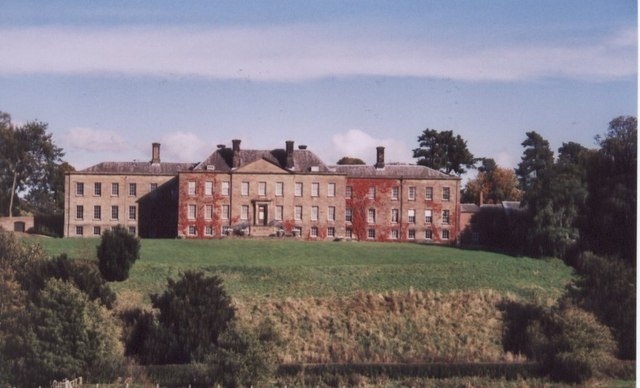
Erddig House, the Yorke family home

Simon Yorke was found dead in Erddig Park on 7 May 1966, from heart failure. He was buried in Marchwiel Churchyard. Unmarried, and without a direct heir, Erddig was inherited by his brother, Philip Scott Yorke, who gifted the estate to the National Trust in 1973.
