= Marchwiel =

Village in Wales

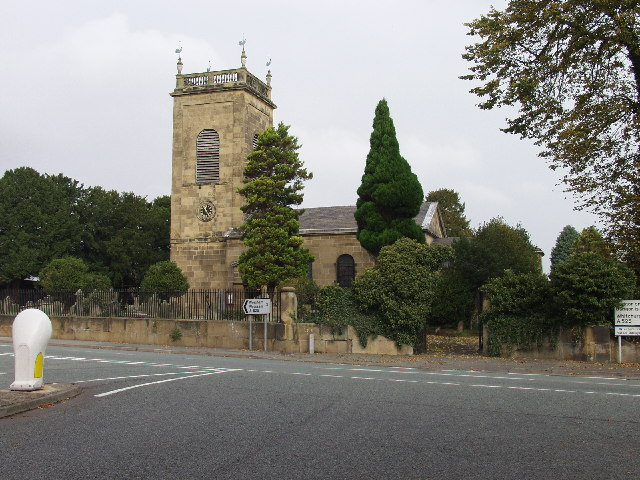
- Marchwiel Parish Church

- Location within Wrexham
- Population: 1,379 (2011)
- OS grid reference: SJ356476
- Community: Marchwiel
- Principal area: Wrexham
- Country: Wales
- Sovereign state: United Kingdom
- Post town: WREXHAM
- Postcode district: LL13
- Dialling code: 01978
- Police: North Wales
- Fire: North Wales
- Ambulance: Welsh
- UK Parliament: Clwyd South
- Senedd Cymru – Welsh Parliament: Clwyd South
- List of places UK Wales Wrexham 53.022°N 2.959°W Map of the community

Marchwiel (sometimes Welsh: Marchwiail) is a village and community in Wrexham County Borough, Wales.

It is about 2 miles south-east of Wrexham city on the A525 road towards Bangor-on-Dee. The community has an area of 1,488 hectares and a population of 1,418 (2001 census), the population falling to 1,379 at the 2011 Census.

Its name is standardised as Marchwiel in both Welsh and English.

== Landmarks ==
There are several large country houses in the area including Marchwiel Hall, Bryn-y-grog, Old Sontley and Erddig Hall, now a National Trust property and a popular tourist attraction. The churchyard is the resting place of the penultimate owner of Erddig, Simon Yorke (1903-1966). The 19th century, Marchwiel Hall was acquired by Sir Alfred McAlpine, founder of Alfred McAlpine and son of 'Concrete' Bob McAlpine.

In the Middle Ages there was a church at Marchwiel dedicated to Saint Deiniol. It was recorded in early times as Plwyf y Marchwiail, "the parish of the saplings"; this is sometimes taken to refer to the materials used to build the first church. The current church building dates from 1778 and is dedicated to Saint Marcella. The church contains a number of memorials to members of the Yorke family of Erddig and has a stained-glass window showing the Yorke family tree. The public house is the Red Lion which dates back to the early 1900s and is said to be the centre of the village.

== Transport ==
Marchwiel had a station on the Wrexham and Ellesmere Railway. The station closed in 1962, when the Wrexham and Ellesmere Railway closed to passengers.

== Governance ==
An electoral ward in the same name exists. This ward includes Erbistock and at the 2011 census had a total population of 2,371.
