= St Maethlu's Church, Llanfaethlu =

Coordinates: 53.3536°N 4.5367°W

St Maethlu's Church
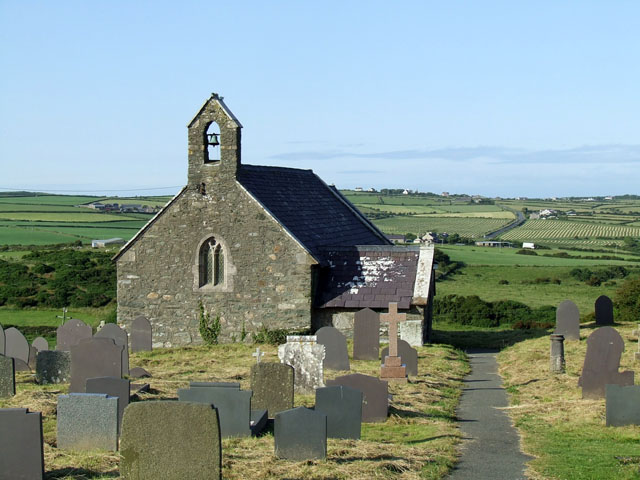
- St Maethlu's Church
- Country: Wales
- Denomination: Church in Wales

Architecture
- Heritage designation: Grade II*
- Designated: 4 May 1971
- Architectural type: Church
- Style: Medieval

St Maethlu's Church is a medieval church in the village of Llanfaethlu, Anglesey, Wales. It is one of a number of churches in the parish and benefice of Bro Padrig, the appointed clergyman being the Reverend T. J. Jones. The building dates from the 15th century and underwent renovations in the early twentieth century. It was designated a Grade II*-listed building on 4 May 1971.

== Dedication ==
The church is dedicated to Saint Maethlu. He was an early Christian saint known as Maethlu the Confessor who is believed to have founded a religious house some three quarters of a mile to the south of the present church.

== The building ==
St Maethlu's Church dates back to the fifteenth century when the nave was built, and the porch with its original stone benches probably dates to the same period. The walls are of rubble masonry and the roof is of slate. The bellcote is at the west gable end and the bell is dated 1760. The nave has three bays and is in the Perpendicular style. There are two original fifteenth century windows on the south side of the nave, each consisting of a square frame enclosing two cinquefoiled lights. There are some fine eighteenth and nineteenth century bronze and marble monuments on the north wall. The chancel was added in 1874 and the whole building was restored in the early part of the twentieth century.

== Listed building ==
St Maethlu's Church was designated as a Grade II*-listed building on 4 May 1971, being a good example of "a small rural church, largely of the C15, retaining original fabric and detail, and which includes a fine series of memorials, some of C16 and C17 dates." The Royal Commission on the Ancient and Historical Monuments of Wales curates the archaeological, architectural and historic records for this church. These include digital photographs of the exterior and interior of the building, collections of drawings, a collection of colour slides and NMR Site Files.
