= St Brothen's Church, Llanfrothen =

Coordinates: 52.9503°N 4.0521°W

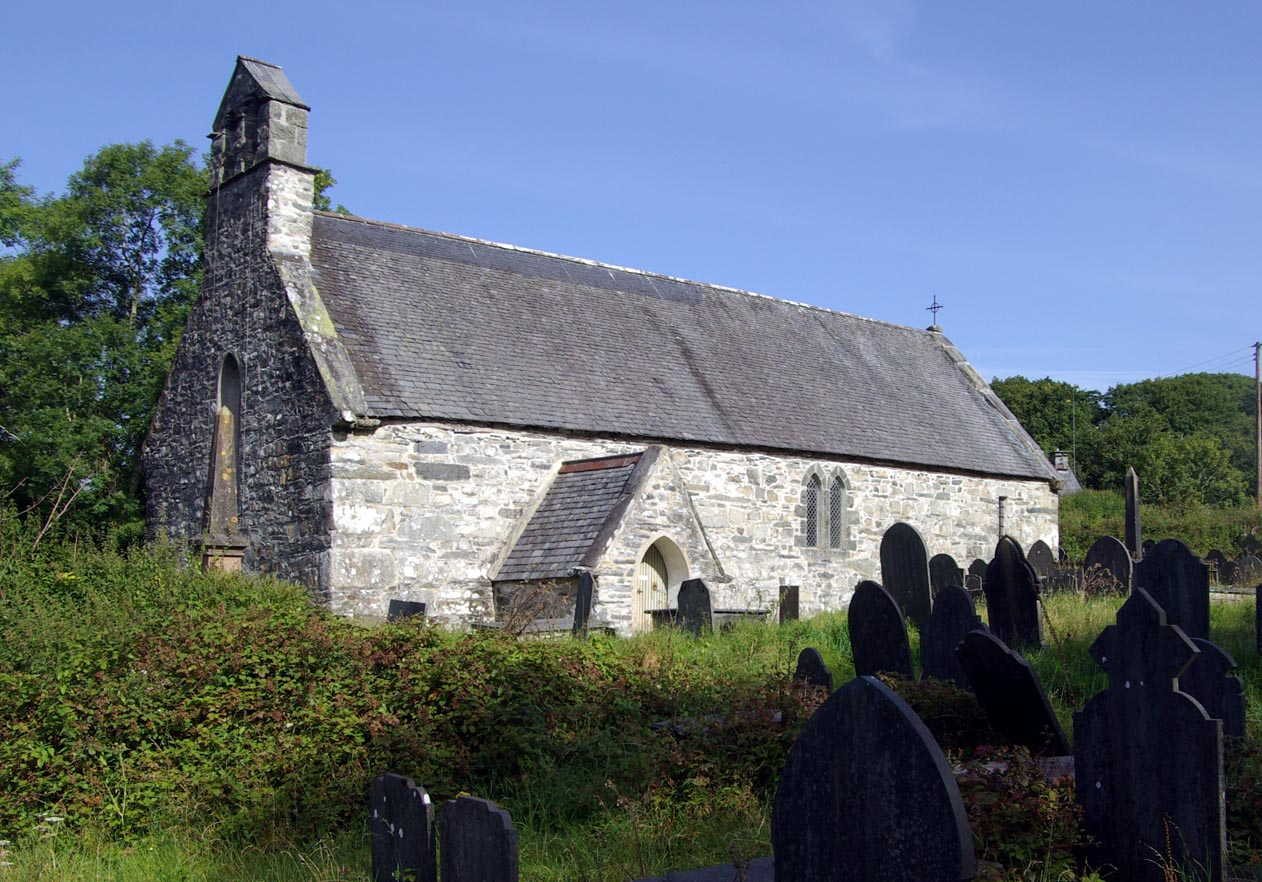
- St Brothen's Church

- Location in Gwynedd
- OS grid reference: SH 622 412
- Location: Llanfrothen, Gwynedd
- Country: Wales
- Denomination: Church in Wales
- Website: Friends of Friendless Churches

History
- Dedication: Saint Brothen

Architecture
- Functional status: Redundant
- Heritage designation: Grade I
- Designated: 30 November 1966
- Architectural type: Church
- Style: Gothic
- Groundbreaking: 13th century

Specifications
- Length: 66 feet (20 m)
- Width: 20 feet (6 m)
- Materials: Stone, slate roof

St Brothen's Church, Llanfrothen, is a redundant church at the edge of the village of Llanfrothen, Gwynedd, Wales. It is designated by Cadw as a Grade I listed building, as it is "a fine Medieval church retaining much of exterior and interior interest". It is under the care of the Friends of Friendless Churches.

== History ==
According to tradition, the church is built on a site founded in the late 6th century by Saint Brothen, reputedly one of the seven sons of the legendary Helig ap Glanawg. Most of the fabric of the present church dates from the 13th century. It was re-roofed in the 15th century, and the south porch and the bellcote were probably added in the 17th century. The church was restored in 1844, and a further restoration took place later in the same century when new windows were installed in the nave and the floor was tiled. It was vested with the charity the Friends of Friendless Churches in 2002, who hold a 999-year lease with effect from 1 January 2005.

The churchyard is the resting place of Richard Humphreys and Margaret Wynn, parents of Humphrey Humphreys who was Bishop of Bangor and then Hereford.

The church and parish achieved prominence throughout Wales in 1888 when David Lloyd George, then a young local solicitor, took a case involving burial rights in Llanfrothen churchyard on appeal to the Divisional Court of the Queen's Bench Division. The case became known as the Llanfrothen Burial Case, and decision of the Divisional Court established the right of the family of a deceased nonconformist to have his body buried in the parish churchyard, by a Baptist minister, and without using the Anglican burial service.

The church was a favourite of architect Clough Williams-Ellis; a paten had been donated by his ancestor J. Williams-Ellis in 1844, and a chalice in 1859. A proposed church memorial to Clough Williams-Ellis, in 1979, was objected to as he was agnostic.

The church has been designated by Cadw as a Grade I listed building since 1966 as it is "a fine Medieval church retaining much of exterior and interior interest".

== Architecture ==
=== Exterior ===
St Brothen's Church is built on a site that slopes from the west to the east, and the floor of the church slopes correspondingly. It is constructed in local stone, with a slate roof. The plan of the church consists of a simple rectangle forming the nave and the chancel, and it has a south porch. It measures 66 feet (20 m) long by 20 feet (6 m) wide. On the west gable is a double bellcote. The east window is a triple lancet, the central window being larger than the others; the west window is a single lancet. In the north wall is a blocked doorway.

=== Interior ===
Inside the church are old-fashioned box pews, some of which date from the 19th-century restoration, while others were reconstructed at that time from 17th and 18th-century box pews. The floor is tiled with red and black Victorian quarry tiles. The octagonal stone font dates from the 15th century and is in English Gothic Perpendicular style. The oak pulpit is also octagonal, simple in design, and dates from the 17th century. Also in oak is the reading desk, dated 1671. Behind the 15th-century altar is a reredos consisting of a curved beam supported by two medieval newel posts. Between the nave and the chancel is a rood screen, again in oak, with a central opening and four further openings on each side. Tree-ring dating has shown that the wood used for making it came from trees felled between 1496 and 1506.
