= Llanfrothen =

Hamlet in Gwynedd, Wales

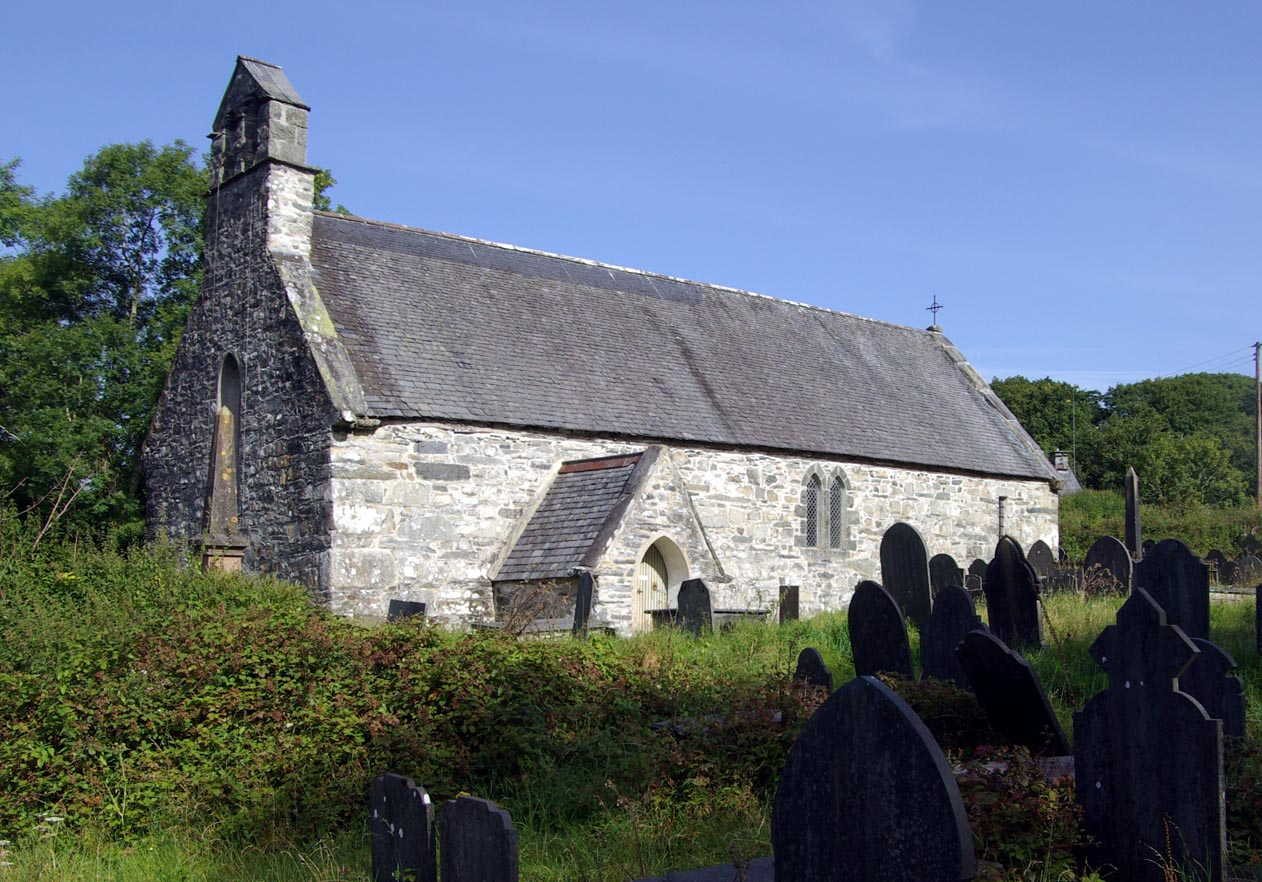

- Location within Gwynedd
- Population: 437
- OS grid reference: SH 6229 4121
  - Cardiff: 108.1 mi (174.0 km)
  - London: 193.6 mi (311.6 km)
- Community: Llanfrothen
- Principal area: Gwynedd
- Country: Wales
- Sovereign state: United Kingdom
- Post town: Penrhyndeudraeth
- Police: North Wales
- Fire: North Wales
- Ambulance: Welsh
- List of places UK Wales Gwynedd 52.950548°N 4.051165°W Map of the community

Llanfrothen (Welsh pronunciation) is a hamlet and community in the county of Gwynedd, Wales, between the towns of Porthmadog and Blaenau Ffestiniog and is 108.1 miles (174.0 km) from Cardiff. In 2011 the population of Llanfrothen was 437 with 70.1% of them able to speak Welsh.

Parc, a Grade II* Listed Building is within the community, as are the village of Garreg and the hamlet of Croesor.

The church at Llanfrothen is dedicated to St Brothen and is a Grade I listed building and is in the care of the Friends of Friendless Churches

The church and parish achieved prominence throughout Wales in 1888 when David Lloyd George, then a young local solicitor, took a case involving burial rights in Llanfrothen churchyard on appeal to the Divisional Court of the Queen's Bench Division. The case became known as the Llanfrothen Burial Case, and decision of the Divisional Court established the right of the family of a deceased nonconformist to have his body buried in the parish churchyard, by a Baptist minister, and without using the Anglican burial service.

== Location ==
The parish is located at the edge of the high lands, immediately overlooking the salt marshes of Morfa Gwyllt. The nearest stations are Pont Croesor on the Welsh Highland Railway and Penrhyndeudraeth and Tan-y-Bwlch, both on the Ffestiniog Railway.

== History ==
The older part of the village is called Garreg, Llanfrothen, and other parts of the village are scattered to the east of Garreg, on the minor road (B4410) leading towards the village of Rhyd. There is a notable pub, the "Brondanw Arms" ("Y Ring" to the locals) and a primary school. On the road north-eastward towards Croesor is Plas Brondanw, a former home of the architect Clough Williams-Ellis.

The hymn writer Richard Jones (Cymro Gwyllt) (1772–1833) served as a Calvinistic Methodist minister in Llanfrothen, where he spent much of his life (he was from Llanystumdwy in Eifionydd).

The church is dedicated to St Brothen, traditionally a son of Helig ap Glannog. It is said that he is buried there. The Brothen Spring, or Old Spring, can be found near the church. There a number of architectural features in the church, including a 13th-century window.

== See also ==
- St Brothen's Church, Llanfrothen
- Plas Brondanw
- List of localities in Wales by population
