= Y Rhiw =

Village in Wales

Coordinates: 52.821°N 4.632°W

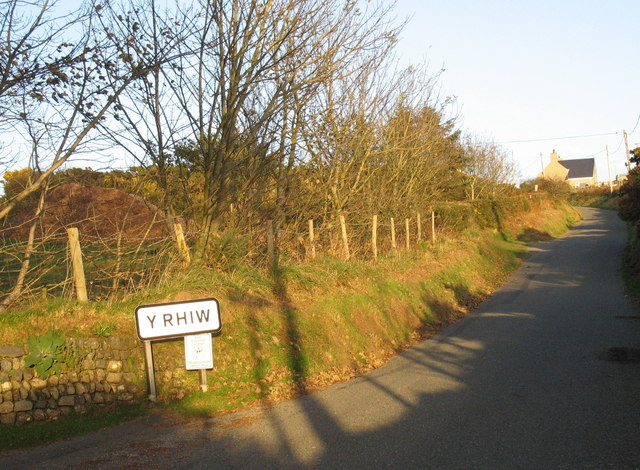
- The road linking Y Rhiw with Aberdaron

- Location within Gwynedd
- OS grid reference: SH227281
- Community: Aberdaron
- Principal area: Gwynedd
- Preserved county: Gwynedd
- Country: Wales
- Sovereign state: United Kingdom
- Post town: PWLLHELI
- Postcode district: LL53
- Dialling code: 01758
- Police: North Wales
- Fire: North Wales
- Ambulance: Welsh
- UK Parliament: Dwyfor Meirionnydd
- Senedd Cymru – Welsh Parliament: Dwyfor Meirionnydd

Y Rhiw (Welsh pronunciation) is a small village on the south west tip of the Llŷn Peninsula in Gwynedd, Wales. The village forms part of the community of Aberdaron.

From the village there are views towards Snowdonia. Nearby is the National Trust owned Plas yn Rhiw.

== History ==
The area has been inhabited at least since the Stone Age. On the slopes of Mynydd Rhiw is a late Stone Age burial chamber and neolithic quarries. Nearby on Mynydd y Graig are three hillforts, several hut circles and terraced fields that are thought to date from the late Iron Age; a Bronze Age cinerary urn was uncovered in 1955.

Common land at Mynydd Rhiw and Mynydd y Graig was enclosed by Act of Parliament in 1811, and barley and oats were grown. Manganese was discovered in 1827; donkeys carried the ore to Porth Cadlan and Porth Neigwl, and in the late 19th century houses were built for industrial workers. By 1914 an aerial ropeway had been constructed, passing over the growing village to a jetty on the shore at Porth Neigwl. In World War I there was a great demand for manganese as a strengthening agent for steel, and the industry became a substantial employer in the village; over 150,000 long tons (150,000 t) of ore were extracted during the lifetime of the mines, and in 1906 the industry employed 200 people. During World War II, coal miners, Cornish tin miners and a contingent of the Royal Canadian Engineers were drafted in to work the mines.

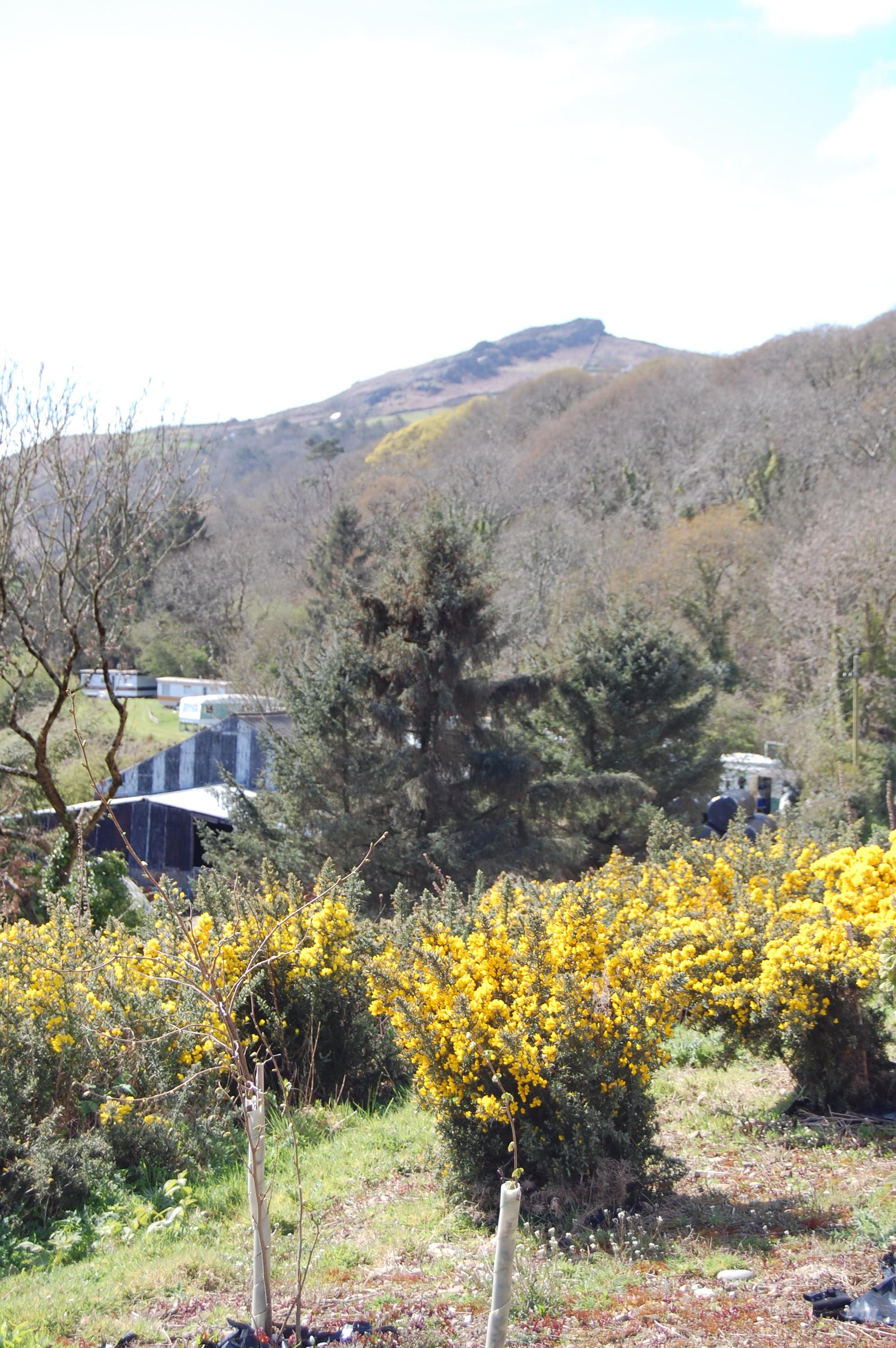
The settlement at Y Rhiw was built in a pass between Mynydd Rhiw and Mynydd y Graig, part of a series of hog-back ridges of igneous rock.

== Notable buildings ==
Plas yn Rhiw is a Grade II* listed early 17th-century manor house, which contains a stone spiral staircase. The house is believed to be on or near the site of an earlier defended house, built by Meirion Goch in the 10th century to prevent incursions by Vikings into Porth Neigwl. It was remodelled in 1820 and restored by the Keating sisters in 1939. It is now owned by the National Trust. The garden lies below the house and is terraced into the slope, divided by hedges into several small compartments; there are views over Porth Neigwl and Cardigan Bay, and in spring and summer there are displays of snowdrops and bluebells. It is the only organic National Trust garden in Wales.

Places of worship include:

- St Aelrhiw's Church, built in 1860 on the footings of an earlier church. The churchyard contains the graves of some of the many bodies that were washed up at Porth Neigwl during World War I.
- Capel Nebo, built in 1813 by the Congregationalists;
- Capel Pisgah, built in 1832 by the Wesleyan Methodists
- Capel Tan y Foel, a Calvinistic Methodist chapel.

Other notable buildings include:

- Hen Felin, an ancient mill which stood close to the shoreline at Porth Neigwl, and was referred to in a Crown survey of 1352. A second mill stood above Plas yn Rhiw, fed by the holy well at Ffynnon Aelrhiw.
- Bwlch y Garreg Wen, built in 1731, is a typical agricultural worker's house of the period. This type of dwelling, known as a 'croglofft cottage', was found throughout the Llŷn Peninsula.
- Tyn y Graig, built at the beginning of the 18th century and constructed of uncoursed boulders. It was originally thatched, but a slate roof was later substituted. It has two tall square capped chimneys, and contains a dairy with a loft above.
- Meillionydd Fawr, which dates from 1616 and is to the west of Mynydd Rhiw. It is a three-storey building with boulder-built walls and a modern slate roof, which was much altered in the 19th century.
- Bryn Gwynt and Pen yr Ogof, examples of 'Moonlight Cottages'. In the 17th and 18th centuries it was common for young couples to squat on land; if they were able to build a cottage over night and have smoke coming from the chimney by dawn, they could keep both the house and surrounding land.
