= Plas Brondanw =

Country house in Gwynedd, UK

Coordinates: 52.95926°N 4.06184°W

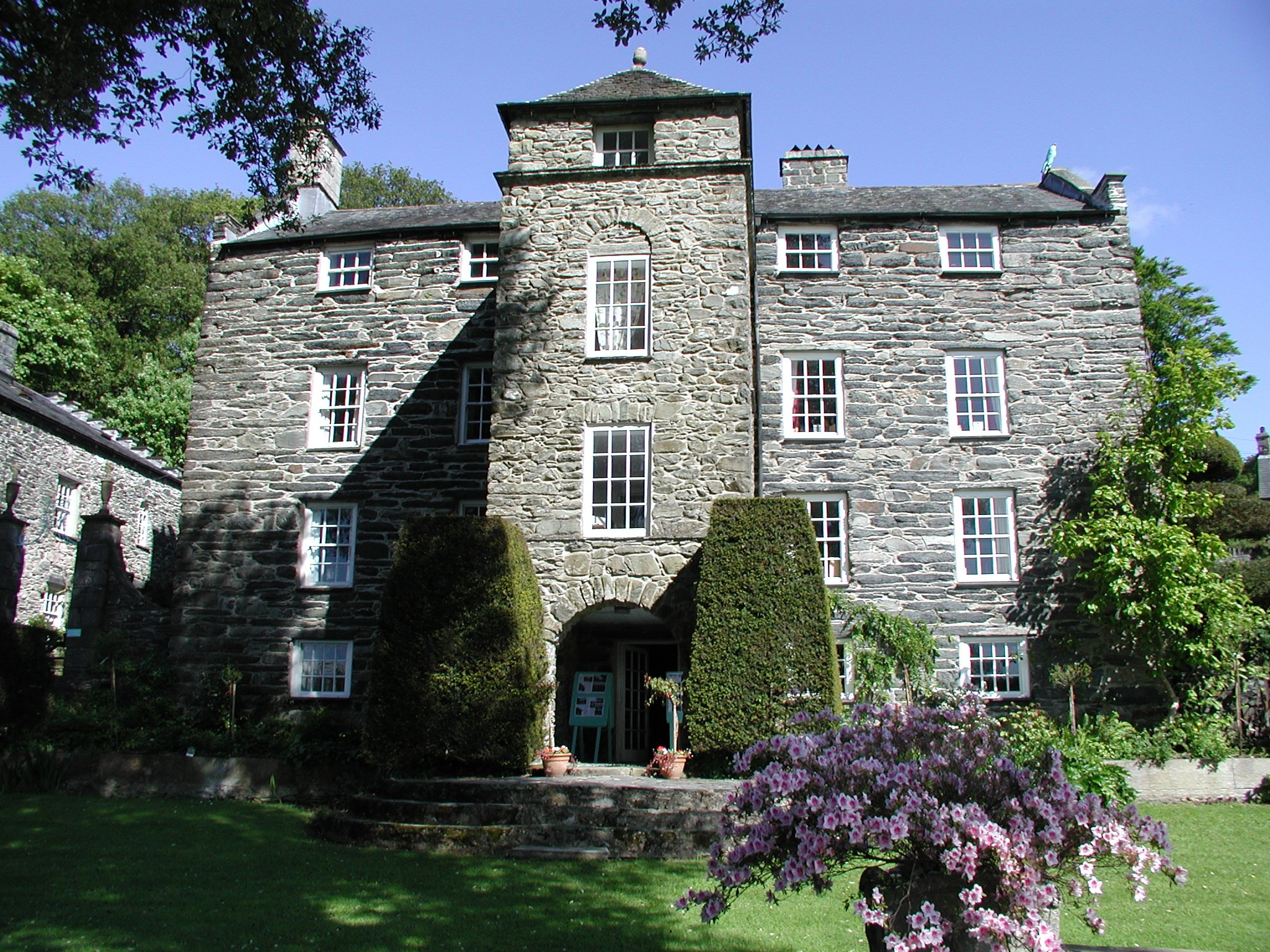
Plas Brondanw

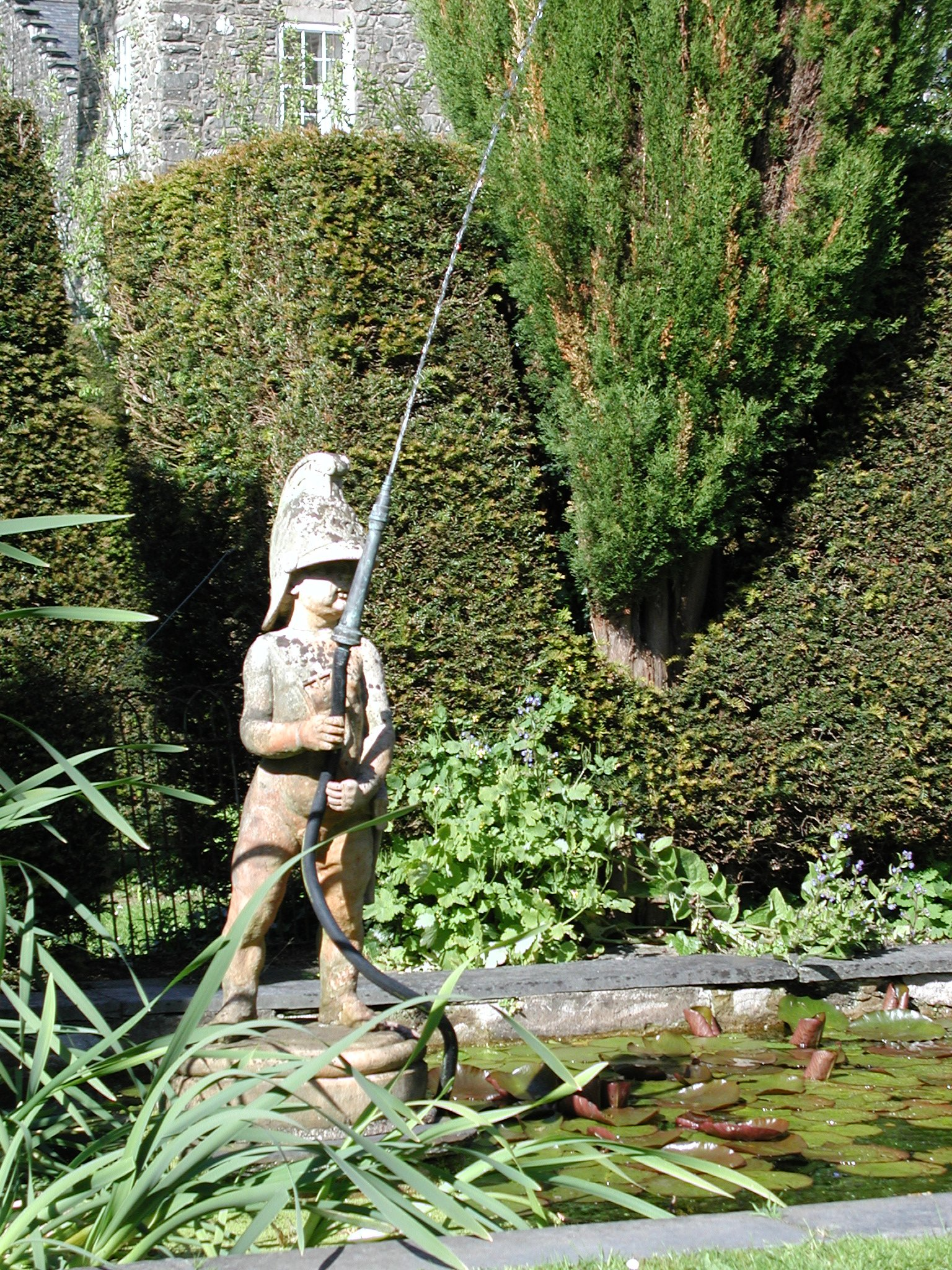
The fireman fountain

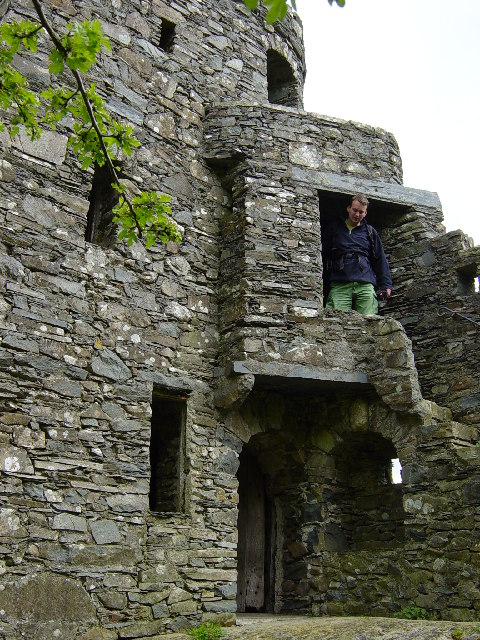
Folly Castle

Plas Brondanw (grid reference SH616422) in Garreg, Llanfrothen, Gwynedd, North Wales, was the family home of Clough Williams-Ellis, creator of the Italianate village Portmeirion, and elements of similar architectural styles can be seen at both locations. It is a grade II* listed building. The gardens, in a series of garden rooms enclosed by yew hedges and open lawns, linked by carefully planned vistas, is one of only three Grade I listed gardens in Gwynedd.

Plas Brondanw stands on the road to the tiny village of Croesor and the distinctive Snowdonia mountain named Cnicht, within the Snowdonia National Park.

== History ==
The house was built by John ap Hywel in about 1550, and another member of the family, William Williams, made various improvements in 1660. The names Williams and Ellis became linked together in 1807 when the Reverend John Ellis married Jane Bulgin, who was heiress to the Williams estate. Clough Williams-Ellis inherited the run-down Plas Brondanw from his father in 1908, when he was aged 25, and set about restoring both the house and the gardens. The house itself had by this time been split into apartments, and the garden had been turned into allotments.

In 1951 the property was badly damaged by fire, and this event, and the subsequent restoration of the property, is commemorated by a flaming urn statue, mounted at the top of a waterfall. The restoration was completed by December 1953.

Also across the road, but within the grounds of Plas Brondanw, Williams-Ellis had constructed a folly named Folly Castle. A plaque records that the castle was "a wedding present from the Welsh Guards to Clough Williams-Ellis and Amabel Strachey in 1915." Located on a small hill, it affords good views of the surrounding landscape. Scenes from the film The Inn of the Sixth Happiness and the Doctor Who episode "The Five Doctors" were filmed at the folly.

== Visitor information ==
The gardens are open to the public for a small fee. The former stable building was converted into a cafe and craft shop in 2011.

== See also ==
- List of gardens in Wales
