= Carreglwyd =

Mansion and estate near Llanfaethlu, Anglesey

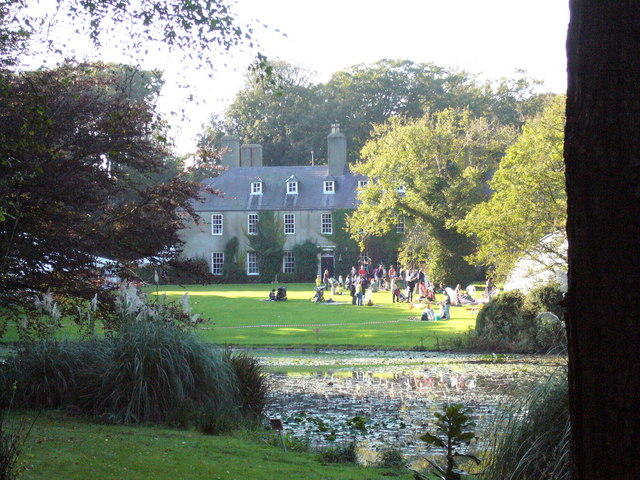
- Carreglwyd House

- Location within Anglesey
- 53°21′34″N 4°32′35″W
- Type: House
- Location: Llanfaethlu, Anglesey

History
- Built: 1634

Site notes
- Architectural style: Georgian
- Owner: Carpenter family
- Website: carreglwydestate.co.uk

Listed Building – Grade II
- Designated: 1 August 1952
- Reference no.: 5267

Cadw/ICOMOS Register of Parks and Gardens of Special Historic Interest in Wales
- Official name: Carreglwyd
- Type: Grade II*
- Designated: 2002
- Reference no.: PGW(Gd)43(ANG)

Carreglwyd is a Georgian country house, on the northwest of the Isle of Anglesey, about 1 km NW of Llanfaethlu in Wales, at grid reference SH309878.

"Carreglwyd" is Welsh for "grey rock", with lwyd being the soft mutation (Welsh: treiglad meddal) of llwyd (usually translated as "grey" in English).

The land was owned by the Tudors of Penmynydd, but they forfeited the estate to the family of Griffiths of Penrhyn during the Glyndŵr rebellion in the 15th century. William Griffiths built the current hall in 1634. It was remodelled and expanded during the 18th to 19th centuries when the estate was joined with the neighbouring estates of the Trygarns and Holland families of Berw. The hall and estate have since been inherited by the Carpenter family.

The hall and estate became a Grade II* listed building as of 1952. From 2010, the estate has become a wedding venue, and it also hosts a year music festival named Gottwood.

== Carreglwyd history ==
=== Family history ===
The Griffiths of Carreglwyd were direct descendants and a younger branch of the Griffiths of Penrhyn family from nearby Caernarfonshire, in North Wales. Gwilym ap Griffith (d. 1431) of Penrhyn married the daughter of Goronwy ap Tudur of the Tudors of Penmynydd family on Anglesey. It was through his son, Gwilym Fychan, and his grandson, Gwilym's second son, Edmund that the estate was passed successively through inheritance. Edmund established the Carreglwyd estate on Anglesey in the 15th century. However, it was not through marriage the Griffiths of Penrhyn acquired the estate. Due to the Glyndŵr rebellion, many Welsh noblemen forfeited their estates to the English crown, but it was during 1407 that Gwilym ap Griffith made peace with the King of England and was restored to his estates, he was also given over 27 estates on Anglesey of Welsh soldiers who had probably died in the rebellion. By 1410, his wife's uncles, Rhys ap Tudur and Gwilym ap Tudur lost their estates due to their roles in the ongoing rebellion, and the lands were added to Gwilym's estate. Between 1431 and 1530 the estate was added to, and the family established themselves a surname as the Griffiths family.

The estate of Carreglwyd was joined with the neighbouring estates of the family of Trygarns of Lleyn and the Hollands of Berw in 1755 through the marriage of John Griffiths with Mary Trygarn, the heiress of the adjoining estates. The married couple's initials are seen on a lead cistern dated 1763. Their son Holland inherited Carreglwyd in 1776 and Berw in 1799. During the following generations Mary, then her son Holland Griffiths, were responsible for a lot of the remodelling, which continued until the 19th century.

By the 19th century, the growing estate was owned by Richard Trygarn Griffiths. He married Emma Mary Carpenter, granddaughter of Sir John Thomas Stanley, 6th Baronet of Penrhos, Anglesey. His daughter became the last direct owner of Carreglwyd. Emma married Sir Chandos Stanhope Hoskyns Reade, 8th Baronet of Shipton. On her childless death in 1917, the house passed to a cousin and then a nephew of hers, and since then, it has been owned by the Carpenter family and is still in the possession of the same family to date.

=== Carreglwyd hall's history ===
The Carreglwyd estate was passed from father to son in the Griffiths family from the 15th century. Edmund's son William became the rector of Llanfaethlu in 1544. The estate, then called Ty'n y pant, was owned by William, who was evicted in 1544 only to be reinstated by 1559 for the price of £700 (equivalent to £300,000 in 2025). The property was passed through successive generations of the Griffiths family for centuries; they were a university-educated family with some members becoming priests in local churches.

The current building was built by William Griffiths (or Griffith), 1597–1648, Fellow of New College, Oxford and a Chancellor of the dioceses of St. Asaph and Bangor. He was Master of the Rolls (in Wales), and a master in chancery. He married Mary (died 1645), daughter of John Owen, bishop of Bangor, and died of the plague on 17 October 1648. He oversaw the building of a new house on the site in 1634. Another William Griffiths, the Chancellor's grandson, made further alterations in the late 17th and early 18th centuries, the oldest of which remains in the southwest side of the house.

In the 18th century, the estate was remodelled by Mary, who married into the Griffiths family. As an heiress, Mary's share vastly expanded the estate, and additions were subsequently added, including stables, a laundry, a walled garden, and a main gatepost. During the ownership of Mary's son, Holland Griffiths (1756-1839) in the late 18th and early 19th centuries, further remodelling of the estate was conducted, during which time the dining room, sitting room and library were given a major renovation. There is a walled kitchen garden which was constructed in 1891. The interior was renovated in the 1980s. The estate opened its grounds to the public for the first time in 1996, with the addition of a car park in 1998. There was a renovation of the stable block in 2010, which was also the year of the first wedding held at the estate.

Its gardens and parkland are listed as Grade II* on the Cadw/ICOMOS Register of Parks and Gardens of Special Historic Interest in Wales. There is a lawn with lime, oak, and sycamore trees lined with a garden lake with woodlands. A Georgian two storey laundry was built in the 18th century to house workers. The buildings have since been converted to offices as of the 1990s. The stables were constructed in the 18th to 19th centuries by the owner, and were renovated in the 1990s.

== Gottwood music festival ==
Since 2010, a yearly music festival has been held on the grounds of Carreglwyd, named Gottwood. The electronic music festival hosts 5,000 attendees, a number first achieved in 2013, and it attracts musicians from around the world. Most of the concertgoers camp on the grounds, essentially in the house's garden. The festival director is the estate owner Tom Carpenter.
