= Philip Scott Yorke =

Welsh squire of Erddig (1905–1976)

Philip Scott Yorke (23 March 1905 – 2 July 1978) was the last Squire of Erddig.

== Early life and education ==
Philip was born on 23 March 1905, at Erddig, Denbighshire. He was the second son of Philip Yorke II and Louisa Matilda (née Scott), and the final direct descendant of Philip Yorke; Simon Yorke was his elder brother. In 1927 he graduated from Corpus Christi College, Cambridge with a B.A., and attended Ridley Hall to take Holy Orders but left without graduating.

== Life at Erddig ==
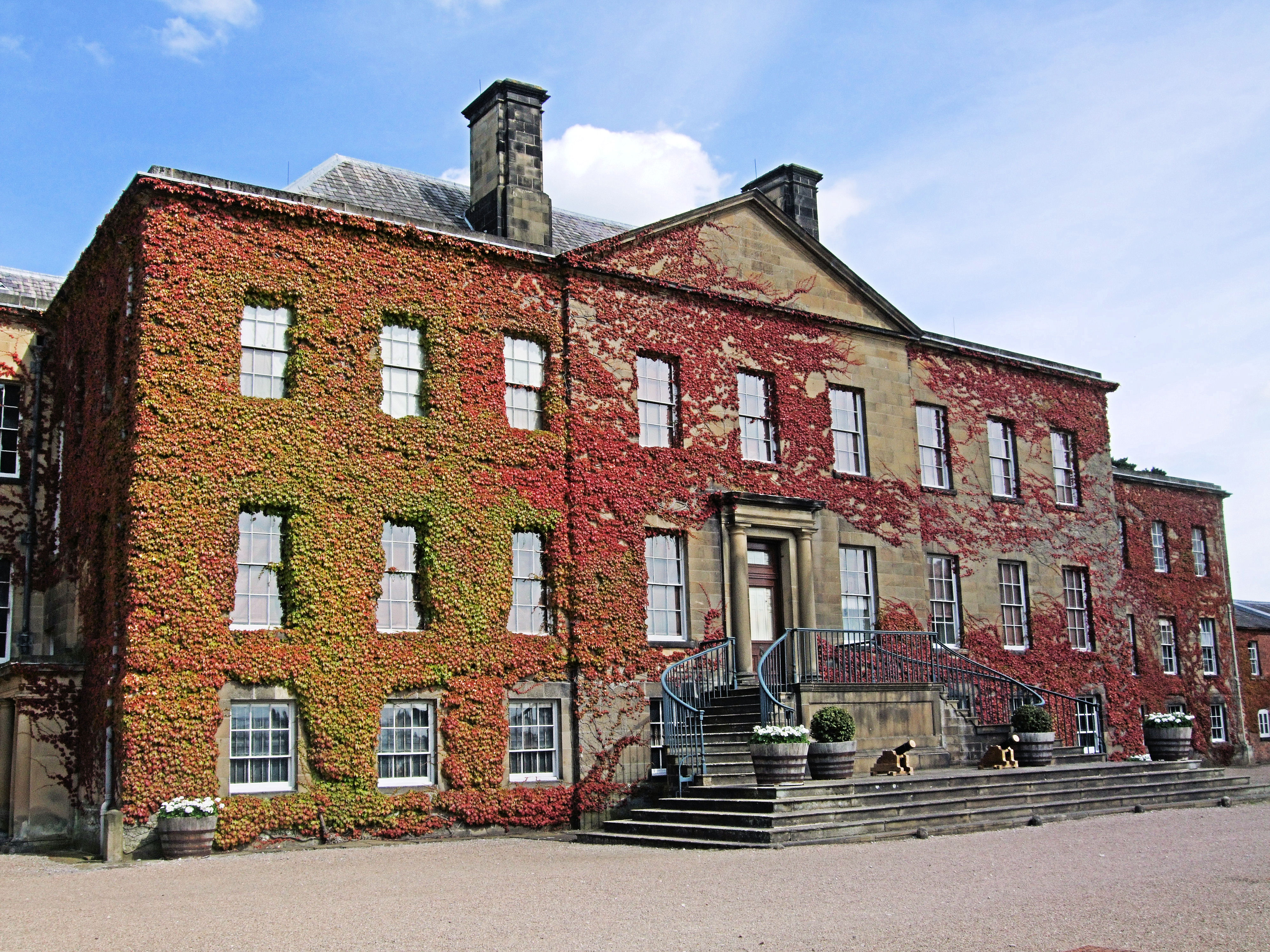
Erddig Hall, now owned by the National Trust.

Yorke was a lay reader for local churches. Erddig's income had been low since the time of their father. In 1973, Yorke gave Erddig Estate, including the house, to the National Trust; a gift then worth around 3 million pounds.

== Death and legacy ==
Philip Scott Yorke died on 2 July 1978, at Pen-y-lan Church near Erbistock, just south of Erddig, after cycling there on a hot morning. More than 15,000 documents from his house were presented to Clwyd Record Office.
