= Rhodri Smith =

Medical physicist and academic

- Education: University of Surrey
- Scientific career
- Fields: Medical physics, nuclear medicine, medical imaging
- Workplaces: University of Alberta; Alberta Health Services; Cardiff University
- Thesis: Motion correction in medical imaging (2017)
- Doctoral advisor: Kevin Wells

Rhodri Lyn Smith is a medical physicist and academic whose research concerns positron emission tomography (PET), medical-image analysis and artificial intelligence in medical imaging. He is a nuclear medicine physicist with Alberta Health Services and an associate professor in the Department of Radiology and Diagnostic Imaging at the University of Alberta.

== Education and career ==
Smith completed a PhD at the University of Surrey in 2017. His thesis, Motion correction in medical imaging, was supervised by Kevin Wells and examined adaptive methods for estimating respiratory motion in PET and other medical-imaging modalities.

Before joining the University of Alberta, Smith worked in clinical and research roles in the United Kingdom and led PET and nuclear-medicine physics services. He subsequently retained an honorary research appointment at Cardiff University.

== Research ==
Smith's research has addressed respiratory-motion modelling, PET image quantification, radiomics, scanner-performance assessment and machine learning in medical imaging.

His work on respiratory-motion correction included the development of adaptive Bayesian and Kalman-filter models for estimating internal organ motion from external observations. He also developed a method for propagating respiratory motion from sparsely sampled dynamic images to higher-resolution volumetric images.

In PET radiomics, Smith and colleagues studied the stability of tumour-texture measurements under different image-reconstruction settings.

In 2024, he led an evaluation of the GE Omni Legend PET–CT system, assessing its performance under the NEMA NU 2-2018 standard and using a genetic algorithm to optimise image quality.

In 2026, the Natural Sciences and Engineering Research Council awarded Smith a Discovery Launch Supplement for research into causal generative modelling of PET images for radiomics harmonisation and counterfactual image synthesis.

== Selected publications ==
- Smith, Rhodri L.; Rahni, Ashrani Aizzudin Abd; Wells, Kevin (2019). "A Kalman-Based Approach With EM Optimization for Respiratory Motion Modeling in Medical Imaging". IEEE Transactions on Radiation and Plasma Medical Sciences. 3 (4): 410–420. Bibcode:2019ITRPM...3..410S. doi:10.1109/TRPMS.2018.2879441.
- Smith, Rhodri Lyn; Dasari, Paul; Lindsay, Clifford; King, Michael A.; Wells, Kevin (2019). "Dense motion propagation from sparse samples". Physics in Medicine and Biology. 64 (20): 205023. Bibcode:2019PMB....64t5023S. doi:10.1088/1361-6560/ab41a0. PMID 31487702.
- Smith, Rhodri Lyn; Bartley, Lee; O'Callaghan, Christopher; Haberska, Luiza; Marshall, Chris (2024). "NEMA NU 2-2018 evaluation and image quality optimization of a new generation digital 32-cm axial field-of-view Omni Legend PET-CT using a genetic evolutionary algorithm". Biomedical Physics & Engineering Express. 10 (2): 025032. Bibcode:2024BPEE...1025032S. doi:10.1088/2057-1976/ad286c. PMID 38346328.
