= List of Church in Wales churches =

This list of Church in Wales churches is arranged by dedication. For a list arranged according to the structures of the Church in Wales, please see the pages for the individual dioceses. For a list arranged by geographical location, please see the lists of churches in each Welsh principal area.

== List of churches ==
Dedication	No.	Churches
St Aelhaiarn	2	Guilsfield, Llanaelhaearn
St Afan	3	Garth, Llanafan, Llanafan Fawr
SS Afran, Ieuan & Sannan	1	Llantrisant
St Agnes	1	Port Talbot
St Aidan (Aeddan)	4	Bettws Newydd, Llawhaden, Rhymney Bridge, Upper Solva
St Alban	3	Cwmduad, Tonyrefail, Treboeth
All Saints	37	Ammanford, Barry, Brynglas (Newport), Buckley, Buttington, Bwlch, Cellan, Cymau, Cyncoed, Deganwy, Dowlais, Ffynnongroew, Glasbury, Gresford, Gwynfe, Kemeys Commander, Little Haven, Llandaff North, Llanedeyrn, Llanfrechfa, Llangorwen, Llansaint, Matthewstown, Mochdre, Newbridge-on-Wye, Newtown, Oystermouth, Pen-y-lan, Penarth, Penyfai, Porthcawl, Rhiwbina, Sinan, Southerndown, Southsea, Trealaw, Wrexham
All Souls	1	Tycoch
St Andoenus	1	Mounton
St Andrew	11	Benllech, Narberth, Newport, Norton, Penrice, Penyrheol, Queensferry, Robeston West, St Andrew's Major, Tonypandy, Tredunnock
SS Andrew & David	1	St Davids Cathedral
SS Andrew & Teilo	1	Cathays
St Anne	9	Coedana, Cross Hands, Cwmffrwd, Penparcau, Rhyl, Rogerstone, Talygarn, Tenby, Tonna
SS Anne & Mary	1	Tan-y-bwlch
St Anno	1	Llananno
St Arthen	1	Llanarthne
St Arvan	1	St Arvans
SS Asaph & Cyndeyrn	3	Llanasa, St Asaph Cathedral, St Asaph
St Augustine	2	Pontllanfraith, Rumney
St Augustine of Hippo	1	Penarth
St Baglan	1	Baglan
St Barnabas	6	Gilfach Goch, Penygraig, Rhandirmwyn, Swansea, Velindre, Waunarlwydd
St Bartholomew	2	Llanover, Sealand
St Baruc	2	Barry Island, Bedwas
St Basil	1	Bassaleg
St Benedict	1	Gyffin
St Berres	1	Llanferres
St Beuno	8	Aberffraw, Berriew, Bettws Cedewain, Botwnnog, Clynnog Fawr, Gwyddelwern, Pistyll, Trefdraeth
St Bilo	1	Llanfilo
St Bleddian	1	St Lythans
St Bledrws	1	Betws Bledrws
St Brigid of Kildare (Ffraid)	18	Aberkenfig, Carrog, Cwmdauddwr, Glan Conwy, Glyn Ceiriog, Llansantffraid (Ceredigion), Llansantffraed (Monmouthshire), Llansantffraed-in-Elwel, Llansantffraid-juxta-Usk, Llansantffraid-ym-Mechan, Netherwent, St Brides, St Brides Major, St Bride's-super-Ely, St Brides Wentloog, Skenfrith, Trearddur Bay, Tregroes
SS Bridget & Cwyfan	1	Lower Dyserth
St Brynach	8	Dinas Cross, Henry's Moat, Llanboidy, Llanfrynach, Llanfrynach (Glamorgan), Llanfyrnach, Nevern, Pontfaen
St Cadfan	2	Llangadfan, Tywyn
St Cadmarch	1	Llangammarch Wells
St Cadoc (Catwg)	21	Aberpergwm, Cadoxton-juxta-Barry, Cadoxton-juxta-Neath, Caerleon, Cheriton, Cwmcarvan, Gelligaer, Llancarfan, Llangadog, Llangattock, Llangattock-juxta-Usk, Llangattock Lingoed, Llangattock-Vibon-Avel, Llanmaes, Llanspyddid, Pendoylan, Penrhos, Pentyrch, Port Eynon, Raglan, Trevethin
St Cadwaladr	3	Bishton, Llangadwaladr (Anglesey), Llangadwaladr (Powys)
St Caffo	1	Llangaffo
St Caian	1	Tregaian
St Callwen	1	Callwen
St Canna	1	Llangan
St Cannen	1	Cilmery
St Caradog	1	Lawrenny
St Carannog	1	Llangranog
St Caron	1	Tregaron
St Cathen	1	Llangathen
St Catherine	15	Arthog, Baglan, Bryn Pydew, Brynaman, Caerphilly, Canton, Criccieth, Cross Keys, Gorseinion, Grandston, Llanfaes, Maerdy, Narberth, Neath, Pontypridd
SS Catherine & John the Baptist	1	Old Colwyn
SS Catherine & Peter	1	Milford Haven
St Cawrdaf	3	Abererch, Jordanston, Llangoed
St Cecilia	1	Mynydd Isa
St Cedol	1	Pentir
St Cedwyn	1	Llangedwyn
St Ceinwr or Ceinwyr	2	Llangeinor, Llangunnor
St Ceitho	1	Llangeitho
SS Ceitho, Celynin, Gwyn, Gwynno & Gwynoro	1	Llanpumsaint
St Celer	1	Llangeler
St Celynin	3	Bronwydd Arms, Llangelynnin, Llwyngwril
St Cenau	1	Llangenny
St Cenhedlon	1	Rockfield
St Cennydd	1	Llangennith
St Cewydd	2	Aberedw, Disserth
SS Cewydd & Peter	1	Steynton
St Chad	1	Hanmer, Holt
Christ Church	23	Abergavenny, Bala, Bethesda, Bryn-y-Maen, Bwlchgwyn, Bwlchycibau, Carmarthen, Deiniolen, Garnant, Georgetown, Govilon, Llangybi, Mostyn, Pant, Penygroes, Pontblyddyn, Prestatyn, Radyr, Rhes-y-cae, Roath Park, Rossett, Swansea, Ynysybwl
Christ the King	1	Malltraeth
St Christopher	1	Bulwark
St Cian	1	Llangian
St Cledwyn	1	Llanglydwen
St Clement	2	Neyland, Rhayader
St Clydai	1	Clydey
St Collen	1	Llangollen
St Colman	2	Capel Colman, Llangolman
Corpus Christi	1	Tremeirchion
St Crallo	1	Coychurch
Holy Cross	7	Cowbridge, Kilgwrrwg, Llannor, Maesgeirchen, Tal-y-bont, West Cross, Y Mwnt
St Cristiolus	2	Eglwyswrw, Llangristiolus
St Curig	2	Llangurig, Porthkerry
St Cwrdaf	1	Llanwrda
St Cwyfan	3	Llangwyfan (Anglesey), Llangwyfan (Denbigh), Tudweiliog
St Cwyllog	1	Llangwyllog
St Cybi	4	Holyhead, Llangybi (Gwynedd), Llangybi (Lampeter), Llangybi (Monmouthshire)
St Cyffig	1	Cyffig
St Cynbryd	1	Llanddulas
St Cynfarch	1	Hope
SS Cynfarch & Mary	1	Llanfair Dyffryn Clwyd
St Cynfelin	1	Caerau
St Cynfran	1	Llysfaen
St Cyngar	2	Borth-y-Gest, Llangefni
St Cynhafal	1	Llangynhafal
SS Cynidr & Mary	2	Aberyscir, Llangynidr
St Cynin	1	Llangynin
St Cynllo	5	Llanbister, Llangoedmor, Llangunllo, Llangynllo, Nantmel
St Cynog	6	Boughrood, Defynnog, Llangynog (Carmarthenshire), Llangynog (Powys), Merthyr Cynog, Ystradgynlais
St Cynon	4	Capel Cynon, Fairbourne, Llwynypia, Tregynon
St Cynwyd	1	Llangynwyd
St Cynwyl	3	Aberporth, Caio, Cynwyl Elfed
St Cynyw	1	Llangynyw
St Cystennin	1	Llangystennin
St David (Dewi)	95	Aberarth, Abergorlech, Abergwili, Abergynolwyn, Ammanford, Bangor Teifi, Banwen, Barmouth, Beaufort, Bettws, Bettws Hill (Newport), Blaenau Ffestiniog, Blaenpenal, Blaenporth, Brawdy, Bridell, Brithdir, Capel Bangor, Capel Dewi, Cardiff, Clynderwen, Colva, Colwyn Bay, Connah's Quay, Cowbridge Road West (Cardiff), Cregrina, Fleur-de-Lis, Froncysyllte, Glascwm, Groesfaen, Haverfordwest, Henfynyw, Heyope, Holyhead, Hopkinstown, Howey, Hubberston, Hundleton, Laleston, Llanarth, Llanddewi, Llanddewi Brefi, Llanddewi-Fach, Llanddewi'r Cwm, Llanddewi Rhydderch, Llanddewi Skirrid, Llanddewi Velfrey, Llanddewi Ystradenni, Llanfaes, Llanthony, Llanwrda, Llanwrtyd Wells, Llanychaer, Llanycrwys, Llanynis, Llwynhendy, Llywel, Loughor, Maesmynis, Maesteg, Manordeifi, Margam, Meidrim, Merthyr Tydfil, Miskin, Morriston, Neath, Nebo, Nefyn, Nottage, Ogmore Vale, Penclawdd, Pencoed, Penllergaer, Penmaen, Penmaenmawr, Penrhyn Bay, Pensarn, Pentwyn, Pontrhydfendigaid, Pontycymmer, Resolven, Rhosllanerchrugog, Rhulen, Rhymney, Saron, Talgarreg, Talybont, Tonyrefail, Trallwng, Trostrey, Tumble, Whitchurch, Whitton, Ystalyfera
SS David & Cyfelach	1	Llangyfelach
St Deiniol	6	Bangor Cathedral, Eyton, Hawarden, Itton, Llanddeiniol, Worthenbury
SS Deiniol & Marcella	1	Marchwiel
St Deiniolen	1	Llanddeiniolen
St Denis	2	Lisvane, Llanishen
St Derfel	1	Llandderfel
St Digain	1	Llangernyw
St Dingat	3	Dingestow, Llandovery, New Tredegar
St Dochdwy	2	Llandough (Penarth), Llandough (Cowbridge)
St Doged	1	Llandoged
St Dogfael	1	Sealyham
St Dogfan	1	Llanrhaeadr-ym-Mochnant
St Dogmael	1	Mynachlogddu
St Dona	1	Llanddona
St Donat	3	Carnetown, St Donats, Welsh St Donats
St Dubricius (Dyfrig)	3	Gwenddwr, Llanrumney, Llanvaches
SS Dubricius & Samson	1	Grangetown
St Dunawd	1	Bangor-on-Dee
St Dunstan	1	Ferndale
St Dwywe	1	Llanddwywe
St Dyfan & Teilo	1	Barry (Merthyr Dyfan)
St Dyfnog	1	Llanrhaeadr-yng-Nghinmeirch
St Edern	2	Bodedern, Edern
St Edeyrn	1	Llanedeyrn
St Edith	1	Llanedi
St Edmund	2	Crickhowell, Tycroes
St Edward	2	Knighton, Roath
St Edwen	1	Llanedwen
St Egwad	2	Llanegwad Nantgaredig, Llanfynydd
St Eigon	1	Llanigon
St Eilian	1	Llaneilian
St Elen	2	Llanellen (may be to St Helen?), Penisa'r Waun
SS Eleri & Mary	1	Llanrhos
St Eleth	1	Amlwch
St Elian	1	Llanelian
St Elidan	1	Llanelidan
St Elidyr	2	Amroth, Ludchurch
St Elli	1	Gilwern
St Ellteyrn	1	Capel Llanilltern
St Ellyw	1	Llanelli
St Elvan	1	Aberdare
Emmanuel	2	Buckley, Penyffordd
St Engan	1	Llanengan
St Erfyl	1	Llanerfyl
St Ethelwold	1	Shotton
St Eugrad	1	Llaneugrad
SS Eurgain & Peter	1	Northop
St Fagan	1	Trecynon
St Faith	1	Llanishen
SS Faith & Tyfei	1	Lamphey
St Ffinan	1	Llanffinan
St Fflewin	1	Llanfflewin
St Ffwyst	1	Llanfoist
St Florentius	1	St Florence
St Foddhyd	1	Clocaenog
St Francis	1	Sandycroft
St Gabriel	2	Cwmbran, Swansea
St Gallgo	1	Llanallgo
St Gartheli	1	Abermeurig
St Gastyn	2	Llangasty Talyllyn
St George	6	Cwmparc, Reynoldston, Rhos-on-Sea, St George, St George-super-Ely, Tredegar
St Germanus (Garmon)	7	Betws Garmon, Castle Caereinion, Llanarmon, Llanarmon Dyffryn Ceiriog, Llanarmon-yn-Iâl, Llanfechain, Roath, St Harmon
St Giles	3	Gileston, Letterston, Wrexham
The Good Shepherd	1	Drury
St Grwst	1	Llanrwst
St Gwendoline	2	Llyswen, Talgarth
St Gwenfaen	1	Rhoscolyn
St Gwenllwyfo	1	Llanwenllwyfo
St Gwenog	1	Llanwenog
St Gwladys	1	Bargoed
St Gwnnws	1	Tynygraig
St Gwrhai	1	Penstrowed
St Gwrthwl	1	Llanwrthwl
St Gwyddelan	2	Dolwyddelan, Llanwyddelan
St Gwynan	1	Penmaenmawr
St Gwyndaf	2	Llanwnda (Gwynedd), Llanwnda (Pembrokeshire)
St Gwynhoedl	1	Llangwnadl
St Gwynio	1	Llanwinio
St Gwynno	3	Abercynon, Vaynor, Ynysybwl
St Gwynog	3	Aberhafesp, Llangennech, Llanwnog
St Gwynour	1	Penclawdd
St Harmon	1	St Harmon
St Hilda	1	Griffithstown
Holy Spirit	3	Ewloe, Hubberston, Prestatyn
St Hychan	1	Llanychan
St Hywel	1	Llanhywel
St Hywyn	1	Aberdaron
St Idloes	1	Llanidloes
St Iestyn	2	Llaniestyn (Anglesey), Llaniestyn (Gwynedd)
St Ilan	1	Eglwysilan
St Ilar	5	Erbistock, Killay, Llanilar, St Hilary, Trefilan
St Ilid	1	Cray
SS Ilid & Curig	1	Llanilid
St Illtyd	13	Fforestfach, Ilston, Llanelltyd, Llanharry, Llantrithyd, Llantwit Fardre, Llantwit Major, Mamhilad, Neath, Newcastle, Oxwich, Pembrey, Williamstown
SS Illtyd, Gwynno & Dyfodwg	1	Llantrisant
SS Illtyd & Peter	1	Llanhamlach
St Ina	1	Llanina
St Isan	1	Llanishen
St Isfael (Ishmael)	5	Camrose, Rosemarket, St Ishmaels (Carmarthenshire), St Ishmaels (Pembrokeshire), Uzmaston
St Issell	1	St Issells
St Issui	1	Patricio
St James	19	Cwmann, Dale, Devauden Green, Holywell, Llanvetherine, Llanwrtyd Wells, Llwydcoed, Manorbier, Nantglyn, New Brighton, Pyle, Reynalton, Rhos, Rhosddu, Rudry, Taffs Well, Uplands, Walwyn's Castle, Wick
SS James & Elidyr	1	Stackpole
St Jeffrey	1	Jeffreston
St Jerome	1	Llangwm
St John	27	Barmouth, Betws Ifan, Carmarthen, Garthmyl, Graig, Hafod, Hay-on-Wye, Llangollen, Llangwm Isaf, Llanhennock, Llansamlet, Maesteilo, Neath Abbey, Nelson, Pembroke Dock, Penrhyncoch, Pontneathvaughan, Pontsian, Pontyberem (old), Pontyberem (new), Porthmadog, Rhosnesni, Rhosymedre, Six Bells, Talysarn, Templeton, Ysbyty Ystwyth
St John the Baptist	22	Aberdare, Alltwen, Bettisfield, Cardiff, Carno, Cefncoed, Danescourt, Glyncorrwg, Llanblethian, Llanystumdwy, Newton, Penhow, Penmaen, Penmynydd, Pontfadog, Rogerstone, Sully, Ton Pentre, Troedyrhiw, Upper Machen, Ysbyty Cynfyn, Ystrad Meurig
St John the Evangelist	19	Aberkenfig, Brecon Cathedral, Canton, Cilybebyll, Cross Keys, Cwmbach, Cymmer, Cynwyd, Dolanog, Felin-gwm, Gowerton, Llandenny, Maindee, Penllyn, Pontrobert, Pool Quay, Rhydymwyn, Tretower, Waunfelin
St Joseph	1	Cwmaman
St Julian	1	Tenby
SS Julius & Aaron	2	Llanharan, Newport
St Justinian	1	Lower Freystrop
St Keyne (Ceinwen)	1	Llangeinwen
Lamb of God	1	Beulah
St Lawrence	2	Tenby, Wolfscastle
St Leonard	1	Loveston
St Llawddog	4	Cenarth, Cilgerran, Pontarsais, Velindre
St Lleian	1	Gorslas
St Lleurwg	1	Hirwaun
St Llonio	1	Llandinam
St Llwchaiarn	4	Llanllwchaiarn, Llanmerewig, Llanychaearn, Newquay
St Llwydian	1	Heneglwys
St Llyr	1	Llanyre
St Lucy	3	Abernant, Betws Leucu, Llanwnnen
St Luke	6	Canton, Cilfynydd, Cwmdare, Gellideg, Llanllwni, Rhydyfelin
St Mable	1	Llanvapley
St Mabon	1	Nelson
St Machraeth	2	Llanfachraeth, Llanfachreth
St Madoc	4	Haroldston West, Llanbadoc, Llanmadoc, Nolton Haven
St Madryn	1	Trawsfynydd
SS Mael & Sulien	2	Corwen, Cwm
St Maelog	3	Llandefaelog Fach, Llandyfaelog, Llanfaelog
St Maelrhys	1	Llanfaelrhys
St Maethlu	1	Llanfaethlu
St Marcella	1	Llanfarchell
St Margaret	13	Aberaman, Blackwood, Bodelwyddan, Crynant, Cwmllynfell, Eglwys Gymyn, Ford, Gilfach, Glantawe, Pendine, Risca, Roath, Wrexham Garden Village
St Mark	8	Abertillery, Caia Park, Connah's Quay, Cwm-Coch, Gabalfa, Gwenlli, Nantmel, Allt-yr-yn (Newport)
St Martin	12	Caerphilly, Cwmyoy, Dunvant, Eglwysbach, Haverfordwest, Laugharne, Llanmartin, Llay, Merthyr, Newport, Penyclawdd, Roath
Holy Martyrs	1	Mathry
St Mary	155	Abbeycwmhir, Aberavon, Abergavenny, Aberystwyth, Angle, Bancyffordd, Barry Dock, Beddgelert, Begelly, Bersham, Bettws Disserth, Betws-y-Coed, Blaengwrach, Bodewryd, Bonvilston, Brackla, Brecon, Bronllys, Broughton, Brithdir, Briton Ferry, Brymbo, Bryncroes, Brynmawr, Builth Wells, Burry Port, Burton, Caerhun, Caernarfon, Caldicot, Cantref, Capel-y-Ffin, Cardiff, Cardigan, Carew Cheriton, Carmel, Cefn Meiriadog, Chepstow, Chirk, Cilcain, Clydach, Coity, Crickadarn, Croesyceiliog, Cwrt-Henri, Cyffylliog, Cynghordy, Denbigh, Dolbenmaen, Dolgarrog, Dolgellau, Fishguard, Gladestry, Glyntaff, Hakin, Halkyn, Haverfordwest, Hay-on-Wye, Hayscastle, Herbrandston, Johnstown, Kidwelly, Little Haven, Llanbrynmair, Llanfair (Harlech), Llanfair (Llandovery), Llanfair Caereinion, Llanfair Clydogau, Llanfair Discoed, Llanfair Green, Llanfair-is-gaer, Llanfair Mathafarn Eithaf, Llanfair Nant-Gwyn, Llanfair Talhaiarn, Llanfair-yn-y-Cwmwd, Llanfair-yng-Nghornwy, Llanfairpwllgwyngyll, Llanfaredd, Llangwyfan, Llanllugan, Llanllwch, Llannerch-y-medd, Llanwern, Llanywern, Llwydiarth, Maestir, Maenclochog, Maesteg, Magor, Malpas (Newport), Manorowen, Margam, Marshfield, Menai Bridge, Minera, Mold, Monknash, Monmouth, Nash, Nash (Newport), Nercwys, New Radnor, Newchurch, Newport, Newport (Monmouthshire), Nolton, Northop Hall, Overton-on-Dee, Panteg, Pembroke, Penallt, Pencader, Penmark, Pennard, Penterry, Pentraeth, Pilleth, Pont-iets, Portskewett, Puncheston, Redberth, Rhossili, Rhuddlan, Risca, Roch, Rogiet, Ruabon, St Fagans, St Mary Church, St Mary Hill, Seven Sisters, Skewen, Spittal, Strata Florida, Swansea, Talachddu, Tenby, Towyn, Trecastle, Trecwn, Trefriw, Tregare, Tregarth, Treuddyn, Undy, Usk, Walton East, Welshpool, Wenvoe, Whitchurch, Whitland, Wilcrick, Y Felinheli, Ysceifiog, Ystradfellte
St Mary & All Saints	1	Conwy
SS Mary & Andrew	1	Fochriw
SS Mary & Beuno	1	Whitford
SS Mary & Bodfan	1	Llanaber
St Mary & Christ Church	1	Llanfairfechan
SS Mary & David	1	Flint
SS Mary & Egryn	1	Llanegryn
St Mary & Holy Innocents	1	Merthyr Vale
SS Mary & Nicholas	1	Beaumaris
SS Mary & Peter	1	Bagillt
St Mary Magdalene	10	Bleddfa, Cerrigydrudion, Cwmbach, Goldcliff, Gwaenysgor, Maudlam, Mountain Ash, Penley, St Clears, Wiston
St Matthew	9	Abernant, Borth, Buckley, Dyffryn, Llandefalle, Llanelwedd, Monkswood, Pontypool, Treorchy
St Matthias	1	Treharris
St Mauritius	1	Alltmawr
St Mawgan	3	Llangattock-Vibon-Avel, Llanrhydd, Pencelli
St Mechell	1	Llanfechell
St Meilig	1	Llowes
St Meilyr	1	Clarbeston Road
St Melangell	1	Pennant Melangell
St Mellon	1	St Mellons
St Melyd	1	Meliden
St Michael	77	Abergele, Abertillery, Aberystwyth, Ammanford, Beddau, Beguildy, Betws yn Rhos, Bosherston, Brongest, Brynford, Bryngwyn, Caerwys, Cascob, Cefnllys, Ciliau Aeron, Cilycwm, Cosheston, Criggion, Cwmavon, Cwmdu, Dolau, Efenechtyd, Eglwys Newydd, Eglwysfach, Ewenny, Flemingston, Gaerwen, Glascoed, Golden Grove, Llan Ffestiniog, Llanfihangel Abercywyn, Llanfihangel-ar-Arth, Llanfihangel Crucorney, Llanfihangel Din Sylwy, Llanfihangel Fechan, Llanfihangel-Genau'r-Glyn, Llanfihangel Glen Myfyr, Llanfihangel Helygen, Llanfihangel Lledrod, Llanfihangel Nant-Bran, Llanfihangel Nantmelan, Llanfihangel Rhos-y-corn, Llanfihangel Talyllyn, Llanfihangel-Tor-y-Mynydd, Llanfihangel-Tre'r-Beirdd, Llanfihangel-Uwch-Gwili, Llanfihangel y Creuddyn, Llanfihangel-y-Pennant, Llanfihangel-y-traethau, Llanfihangel-yng-Ngwynfa, Llanfihangel-ystern-Llewern, Llanfynydd, Llanmihangel, Llanrug, Llantarnam, Llanvihangel Gobion, Loughor, Lower Machen, Maesteg, Manafon, Michaelston-y-Fedw, Mitchel Troy, Myddfai, Newchurch, Penbryn, Penrhoslligwy, Pontypool, Rudbaxton, Talley, Tintern Parva, Tongwynlais, Trebanos, Trefeglwys, Treffgarne, Treflys, Valley, Ystrad Aeron
St Michael & All Angels	13	Cathays, Clyro, Colwinston, Dafen, Forden, Kerry, Llandudno Junction, Llanfihangel Brynpabuan, Manselton, Michaelston-le-Pit, Nannerch, Pontardulais, Trelawnyd
St Morhaiarn	1	Gwalchmai
St Mungo (Cyndeyrn)	1	Llangyndeyrn
SS Mwrog & Mary	1	Llanfwrog
St Myllin	1	Llanfyllin
Holy Nativity	1	Penarth
SS Nefydd & Mary	1	Llannefydd
St Nicholas	10	Grosmont, Monington, Montgomery, New Moat, Nicholaston, Penally, St Nicholas, St Nicholas (Vale of Glamorgan), Townhill, Trellech
SS Nicholas & John	1	Monkton
St Nidan	1	Llanidan
St Non	2	Llanerch Aeron, Llannon
St Oswald	1	Sebastapol
St Oudoceus (Euddogwy)	1	Llandogo
St Owain	1	Ystradowen
St Pabo	1	Llanbabo
St Padarn	7	Cross Gates, Llanbadarn Fawr, Llanbadarn Fynydd, Llanbadarn Trefeglwys, Llanbadarn y Garreg, Llanberis, Llangeitho
St Patrick	4	Cemaes, Llanbadrig, Pencarreg, Pennar
St Paul	20	Abertysswg, Bryncoedifor, Capel Newydd, Colwyn Bay, Craig-y-Don, Cwm, Cwmtillery, Dolfor, Glais, Gorsedd, Grangetown, Heol-y-Cyw, Isycoed, Manordeilo, Newbridge, Newport, Pentre Broughton, Pontyclun, Rhosesmor, Sketty
St Paulinus	2	Llangorse, Ystrad Ffin
St Peblig	1	Caernarfon
St Peris	2	Machynlleth, Nant Peris
St Peter	48	Aberbargoed, Aberdyfi, Blaenavon, Blaina, Bontgoch, Bryngwyn, Brynna, Carmarthen, Cockett, Deri, Dinas Powys, Evancoyd, Fairwater, Glantawe, Glasbury, Goodwick, Goytre, Henllys, Holywell, Johnston, Lampeter, Lampeter Velfrey, Little Newcastle, Llanbedr (near Harlech), Llanbedr Dyffryn Clwyd, Llanbedr-y-Cennin, Llanbedr-Ystrad-Yw, Llanbedrgoch, Llandevaud, Llanelli, Llanwenarth, Llanybydder, Marloes, Newborough, Newbridge, Newchurch, Newton, Old Cogan, Painscastle, Penrhosgarnedd, Pentre, Peterston-super-Ely, Pontardawe, Port Talbot, Pwllheli, Rhoose, Ruthin, St Pierre
St Peter ad Vincula	1	Pennal
SS Peter & Paul	2	Abercanaid, Neath
SS Peter, Paul, Dyfrig, Teilo & Euddogwy	1	Llandaff Cathedral
SS Peter, Paul & John	1	Llantrissent
St Petroc	2	Llanbedrog, Y Ferwig
St Philip	2	Newport, Tremorfa
The Resurrection	2	Glan Ely, St Mellons
St Rhedyw	1	Llanllyfni
St Rhian	1	Llanrhian
SS Rhidian & Illtyd	1	Llanrhidian
St Rhwydrus	1	Llanrhwydrus
St Rhychwyn	1	Llanrhychwyn
St Rhyddlad	1	Llanrhyddlad
St Rhystyd	1	Llanrhystyd
St Sadwrn	3	Henllan, Llansadwrn (Anglesey), Llansadwrn (Carmarthenshire)
St Sadwrnen	1	Laugharne
St Saeran	1	Llanynys
St Samlet	1	Llansamlet
St Sannan	2	Bedwellty, Llansannan
St Saviour	1	Splott
St Sawyl	1	Llansawel
St Seiriol	2	Penmaenmawr, Penmon
St Senwyr	1	Llansannor
SS Simon & Jude	1	Llanddeusant
St Stephen	6	Bodfari, Llansteffan, Llanstephan, Pillgwenlly (Newport), Swansea, Ystrad Rhondda
SS Stephen & Tathan	1	Caerwent
St Sulien (Silin)	2	Cribyn, Llansilin
St Tanwg	2	Harlech, Llandanwg
St Tathan	1	St Athan
St Tecla (Teath?)	2	Llandegla, Llandegley
St Tecwyn	1	Llandecwyn
St Tegai	1	Llandygai
St Tegfan	1	Llandegfan
St Tegfeth	1	Llandegfeth
St Teilo	17	Bishopston, Brechfa, Caereithin, Llanddowror, Llandeilo, Llandeilo Graban, Llandeilo'r Fan, Llantilio Crossenny, Llantilio Pertholey, Merthyr Mawr, Morriston, Mynyddygarreg, Newport, Pembroke Dock, Pontardulais, Tonmawr, Trelech a'r Betws
St Tetti	1	Talybont-on-Usk
St Tewdric	1	Mathern
St Theodore of Tarsus	3	Kenfig Hill, Port Talbot, Ynysddu
St Thomas	19	Bylchau, Cefn Fforest, Clydach Vale, Ferryside, Flint Mountain, Glyndyfrdwy, Neath, Newborough, Newport, Overmonnow, Penybontfawr, Penycae, Pontaman, Redwick, Rhyl, St Dogmaels, Swansea, Trethomas, Whitchurch
St Thomas Becket	2	Shirenewton, Wolvesnewton
St Timothy	1	Caerau
St Trillo	3	Llandrillo-yn-Edeyrn, Rhos-on-Sea, Rhos-on-Sea Chapel
SS Trinio, Peter & Paul	1	Llandrinio
Holy Trinity	35	Aberaeron, Aberavon, Abergavenny, Bettws Clyro, Bronington, Bryngwran, Buarth, Cilcennin, Corris, Cross Inn, Ebbw Vale, Esclusham, Felinfoel, Greenfield, Gwernaffield, Gwersyllt, Llanddew, Llandow, Llandrindod Wells, Llandudno, Marcross, Mydroilyn, Newcastle Emlyn, Newport, Penrhos, Penrhyndeudraeth, Pontargothi, Pontnewydd, Pwll, Rhyl, Sketty, Taliaris, Trefnant, Tylorstown, Ystrad Mynach
Holy Trinity & St Anne	1	Nantyglo
St Trygarn	1	Llandrygarn
St Tudno	1	Llandudno
St Tudur or Tudor	2	Darowen, Mynyddislwyn
St Tudwall	1	Llanstadwell
St Tudwen	1	Llandudwen
St Twrog	3	Bodwrog, Llanddarog, Llandwrog
SS Twrog & Mary	1	Maentwrog
St Twynnell	1	St Twynnells
St Tybie	1	Llandybie
St Tyddyd	1	Penmachno
St Tydecho	3	Cemmaes, Garthbeibio, Mallwyd
St Tydfil	5	Bryn, Coedpoeth, Llechryd, Llysworney, Merthyr Tydfil
St Tydfil's Well	1	Merthyr Tydfil
St Tyfaelog	1	Pontlottyn
St Tyfodwg	1	Llandyfodwg
St Tyfriog	1	Llandyfriog
St Tyfrydog	1	Llandyfrydog
St Tygwydd	1	Llandygwydd
St Tyrnog	1	Llandyrnog
St Tysilio	6	Bryneglwys, Llandysilio (Pembrokeshire), Llandysilio (Powys), Llandysiliogogo, Llantysilio, Menai Bridge
SS Tysilio & Mary	1	Meifod
St Tysoi	1	Llansoy
St Tysul	2	Llandyssil, Llandysul
St Ursula	1	Llangwyryfon
SS Ust & Dyfrig	1	Llanwrin
Saint Vitalis	1	Dihewyd
St Winifred (Gwenffrewi)	2	Penrhiwceiber, Penywaun
St Womar	1	Minwear
St Wonnow	1	Wonastow
St Woolos (Gwynllyw)	1	Newport
St Wyddyn	1	Llanwddyn
No dedication	26	Belan Mission Church, Bettws Chapel Llantilio Pertholey, Bettws Penpont Parish Church, Capel Coelbren, Clyne Chapel Blackpill, Coetmor Church Bethesda, Dinas Mission, East Williamston Parish Church, Langstone Parish Church, Llandrindod Wells Old Parish Church, Llandyfan Parish Church, Llandyry Parish Church, Llanfair Church Cwmgors, Llanlleonfel Parish Church, Llantrisant Parish Church, Nantgwyllt Chapel Cwmdauddwr, Norton Mission Church, Pantyffridd Mission Church, Penlan Church Penclawdd, Penrhys Interdenominational Church, Pontprennau Community Church, Rhiwlas Mission Church, Rhydybriw Chapel of Ease Defynnog, Robeston Wathen Parish Church, Trellech Grange Parish Church, Trevor Parish Church
