= SS Mael and Sulien's Church, Corwen =

Church in Denbighshire, Wales

Coordinates: 52.9801°N 3.3733°W

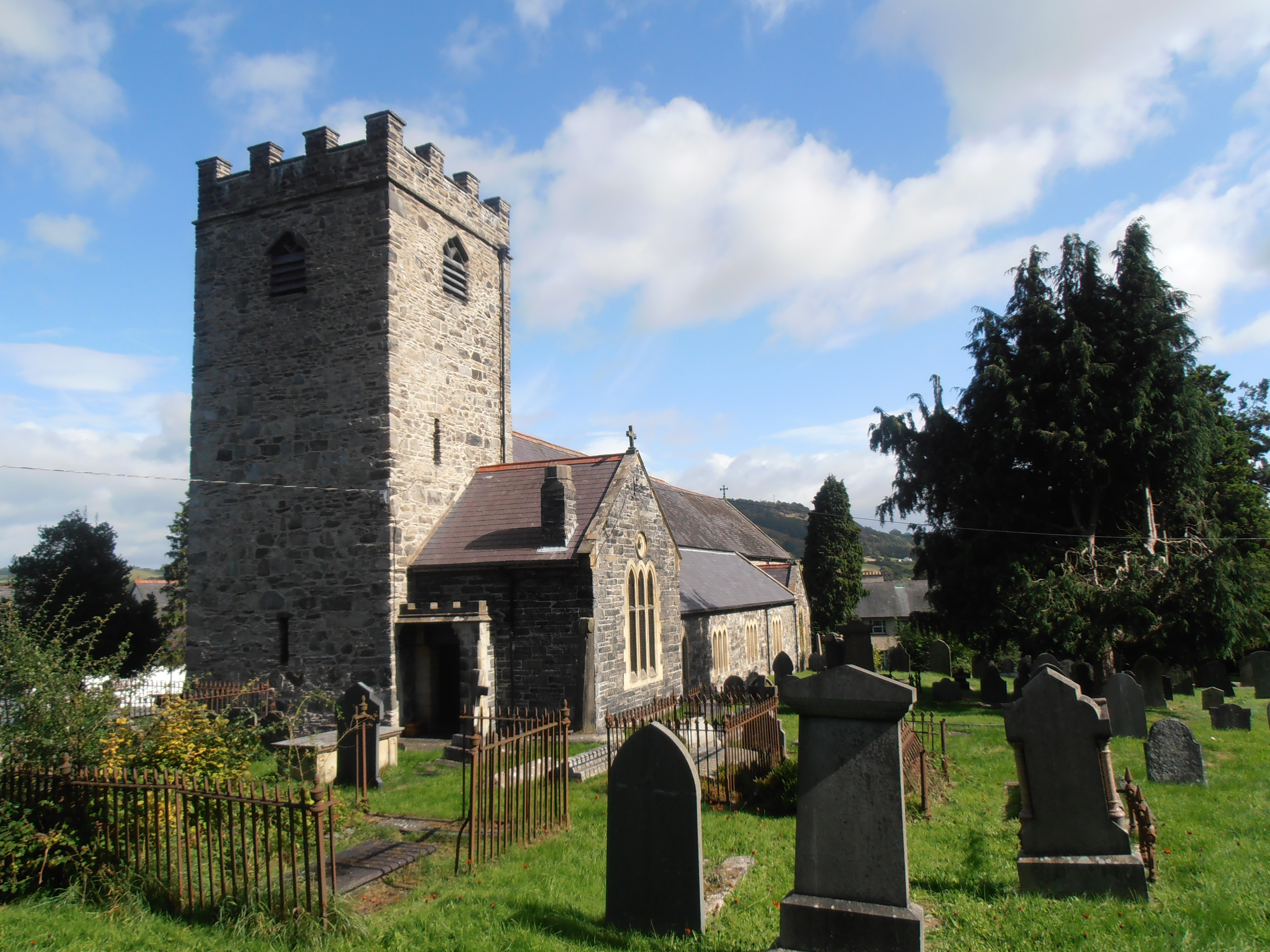
Saint Mael and Saint Sulien's Church

Saint Mael and Saint Sulien's Church is a church located in the town of Corwen in Denbighshire in Wales. It was formerly located in the ancient county of Merionethshire.

== Architecture ==
The church itself dates from the twelfth century and is a single-chambered structure set within a rectangular churchyard, with walls of fourteenth- or fifteenth-century origin. Its baptismal font dates from the twelfth or thirteenth century and the churchyard includes a tomb from the seventeenth century, besides war graves of two soldiers of World War I.

== Dedication ==
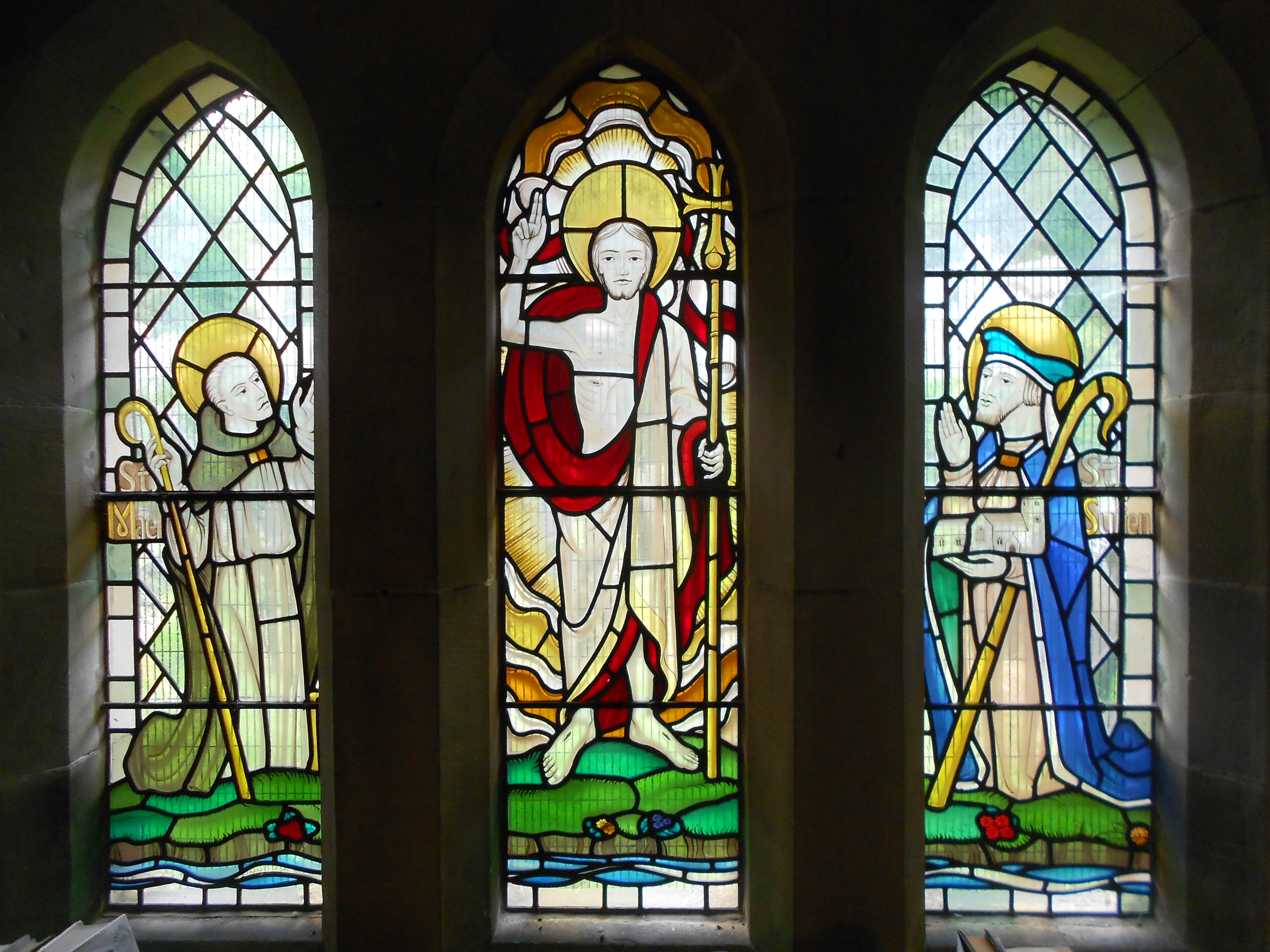
The patron saints, Mael & Sulien, in stained glass

The church is dedicated to St Mael and St Sulien, two Celtic saints of the sixth century, though it has been suggested that an earlier foundation stood on the hill above. Saints Mael and Sulien are said to have been companions of the Breton Saint Cadfan (c. 530-ca. 590), who led a group of missionaries to Western Wales with Saint Tydecho, a cousin, and Saint Cynllo, a friend. They were also accompanied by nine children of Ithel Hael o Lydaw (Baglan, Flewyn, Gredifael, Tanwg, Twrog, Tegai, Trillo, Tecwyn and Llechid), all of whom became saints in the calendar of the Welsh church. One of them, St Trillo, founded a church just outside Corwen at Llandrillo. There was a Saint Sulien or Sulian who was an abbot of Luxulyan, in mid Cornwall, during the sixth century. Sulien is a Welsh variant of the given name "Julian," but has also been interpreted as being derived from the Welsh sul, meaning "sun" + geni, meaning "born," Sulien being the name of a Celtic solar deity.

== Services ==
St Mael and St Sulien's offers services in both English and Welsh.

== The College ==
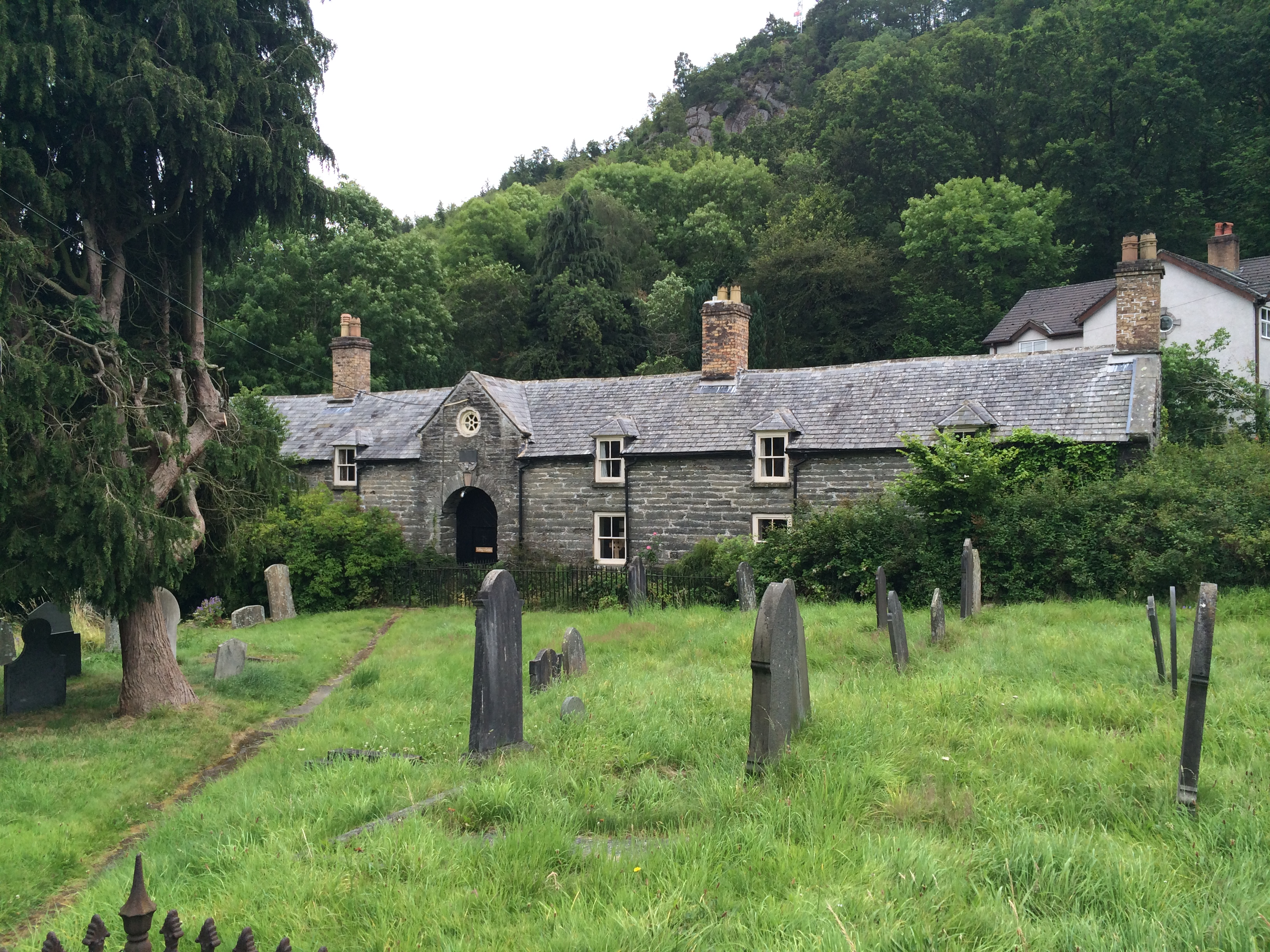
"Coleg y Groes" (Holy Cross College) at Corwen Parish Church.

In 1709 the wealthy land-owner and benefactor William Eyton established Coleg y Groes (English: Holy Cross College), attached to St Mael and St Sulien's Church. The college still stands. Eyton established the college as a community of widows, with the intention of providing both an alms house for the residents, and a community of daily prayer attached to the church. Entrance to the college was through the churchyard, with no direct road access (although secondary access is now provided). The college has a central reception and a bakehouse room, beyond which are six individual residences on two storeys (of the one-up, one-down style). Eyton specified that each of the six residences were to be occupied by the widow of a Clerk in holy orders, who must have been a clergyman of the Church of England (the Welsh Anglican church was not yet independent of England in 1750), who had been "in possession of a cure of souls" (in office) within the County of Merioneth at the time of his death. Today the original College building is in good order, and easily accessible by means of a path from the church . It is in private ownership and used as a holiday let business with 2 cottages for rent. It is a grade II* listed building.

== See also ==
- List of Welsh saints
