= Tanwg =

6th-century Welsh saint

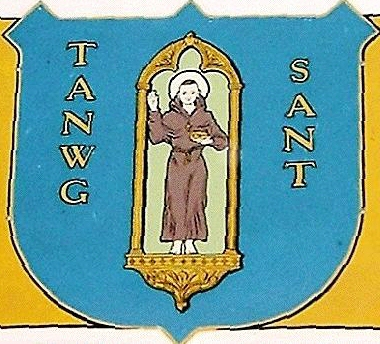
- Born: late 5th century
- Died: 6th century
- Feast: 10 October

Saint Tanwg is the patron saint of Llandanwg, Gwynedd, Wales. He is presumed to be the founder of St Tanwg's Church, the small church at Llandanwg near Harlech, although the presence of an inscribed stone which has been dated to the 5th century suggests the church was already in existence when Tanwg and his brothers arrived in the area early in the 6th century. This Llandanwg Stone is inscribed with two names, one being Ingenui (meaning 'of Ingenuus'); the other is indecipherable. The stone is not local. It is thought to have come from the Wicklow Hills in Ireland. This means that it was probably brought over by a rich person. It is a reasonable conjecture that Ingenuus may have been the founder of the church in the late fifth century, and that St. Tanwg lived at this llan a generation or two later. Another stone, called the Equester Stone, is of 6th century date. It is inscribed Equestrinomine, an unusual form of wording otherwise known only from 4th century inscriptions in Italy and Gaul.

The present church building is medieval, probably dating from the 13th century.

The parish church of Harlech was built in 1840 to replace the Llandanwg church is also dedicated to Saint Tanwg.

Saint Tanwg is said to have been the son of Ithel the Generous of Armorica and the cousin of St Cadfan. According to Enwogion Cymru, he was 'a saint who lived in the early part of the sixth century. He was one of the sons of Ithel Hael and he accompanied St Cadfan from Armorica to Britain. The Enwogion says this was in the time of Vortigern "who procured wise men and divines from Gaul, now called France, to renovate Christianity in this Island, in consequence of the decay and failure that had befallen the faith in Christ" but this is incorrect, as Vortigern ruled from c. 425 to c. 474 and was not known to have favoured Christianity. St Cadfan reportedly was one of the founders of the college of Bardsey as a monastery in 516 AD and to have been Abbot there until 542. He was the brother of Sts. Baglan, Trillo, Tegai, Twrog, Tecwyn, Gredifael, Flewyn and Llechid, and is commemorated 10 October.

== Gallery ==
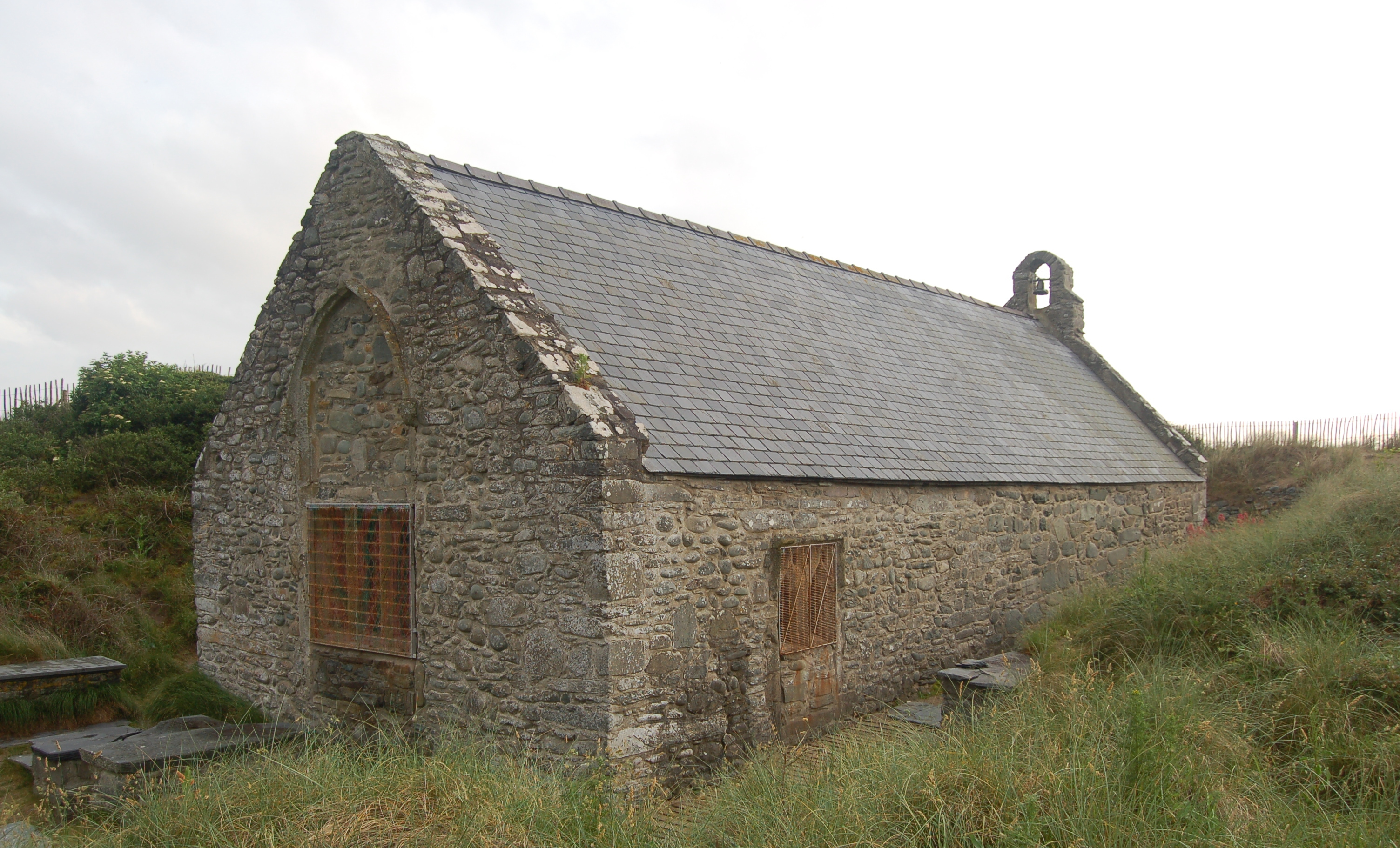
Llandanwg church from the churchyard

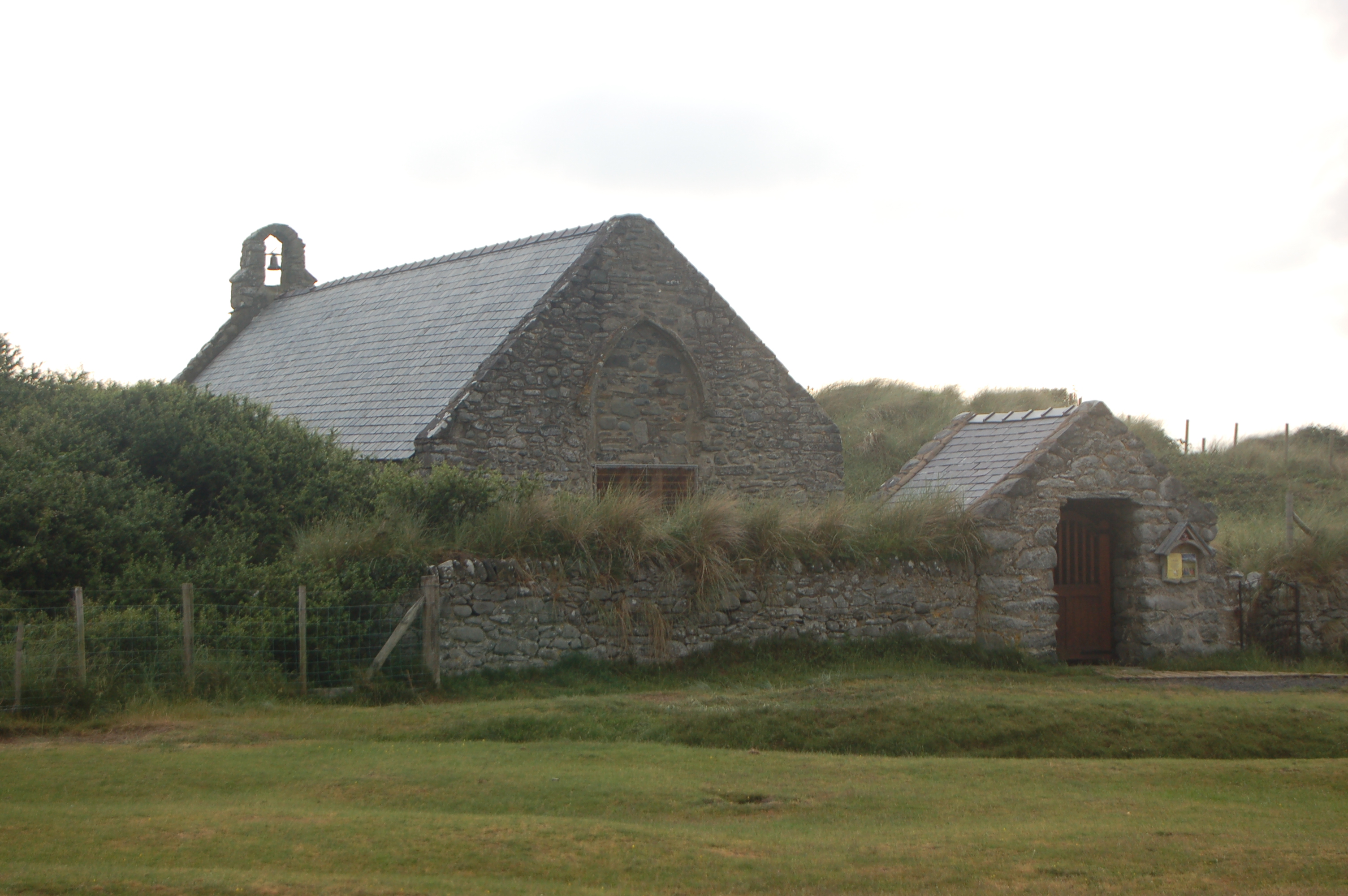
Llandanwg church from Y Maes
