= Saint Cadfan =

Breton and Welsh saint

Abbot
- Born: Brittany
- Died: 6th century Wales
- Venerated in: Catholic Church; Eastern Orthodox Church; Anglican Communion
- Feast: 1 November
- Patronage: St Cadfan's Church, Tywyn

Cadfan (Latin: Catamanus), was the 6th century founder-abbot of Tywyn (whose church is dedicated to him) and Bardsey, both in Gwynedd, Wales. He was said to have received the island of Bardsey from Einion Frenin, king of Llŷn, around 516 and to have served as its abbot until 542.

== Life and legacy ==
Most of the information we have about Cadfan is from the awdl by Llywelyn the Bard in the 12th century. According to this he sailed from Brittany to Tywyn with 12 other saints, although some suggest that they came instead from Llanilltud Fawr.

A Breton nobleman, he was said to be the son of Eneas Ledewig (Aeneas of Brittany) and Gwen Teirbron (Gwen Three Breasts), daughter of Budic II of Brittany. He was a cousin of Saint Derfel.

He journeyed to Britain accompanied by the children of Ithel Hael o Lydaw (of Brittany): Baglan, Flewyn, Gredifael, Tanwg, Twrog, Tegai, Trillo, Tecwyn and Llechid. Other reputed followers include Maël and Ilar. Wade-Evans thought Kentinlau, who accompanied Cadfan to Ceredigion, should be identified with Cynllo. They may have fled the Franks.

At Llangadfan in northern Powys he founded a church before moving on to Bardsey. He also established a clas at Tywyn (traditionally the first such clas in Wales) which became a wealthy site, served by an abbot and clerics from 1147 to 1291, mother church of the cantref of Meirionnydd south of the River Dysynni.

His feast day is 1 November.

== Sources ==
- The Welsh Academy Encyclopaedia of Wales, University of Wales Press, 2008, ISBN 978-0-7083-1953-6
