= Penrhos, Monmouthshire =

Village in south east Wales

Coordinates: 51.80088°N 2.84832°W

St Cadoc's church

Penrhos is a village in the community of Whitecastle in Monmouthshire, south east Wales, United Kingdom.

== Location ==
Penrhos is located three miles north of Raglan.

== History and amenities ==
Penrhos has an old Norman motte and bailey castle site. Penrhos sits on a tributary stream of the River Trothy.

The parish church St Cadoc's Church, Penrhos, is dedicated to Saint Cadoc and is a grade II* listed building. Penrhos is also home to the Tibetan Buddhist retreat, Lam Rim Buddhist Centre, which is open to both practising Buddhists and visitors.

Penrhos was also the birthplace of Roger Williams.
