= Dyfodwg =

6th-century Welsh saint

Saint Dyfodwg
- Venerated in: Roman Catholic Church; Eastern Orthodox Church; Anglican Communion
- Feast: 25 June

Dyfodwg, or Tyfodwg, was a 6th-century Welsh saint. He is one of the three saints (with Illtyd and Gwynno) from whom the ancient parish of Llantrisant takes its name, and possibly the patron (believed to have been Tyfodwg son of Gwilfyw) of the parish church of Llandyfodwg in Glynogwr, between Blackmill and Gilfach Goch in Bridgend, and gave his name to the ancient parish of Ystradyfodwg.

Some records state Dyfodwg was a Breton monk, while others that he was born within the Glamorgan area. Iolo Morgannwg states that Dyfodwg founded a church at Ystradyfodwg (The vale of Tyfodwg) and was a disciple of Illtyd at Llantwit Major. However, there is no record of any church being dedicated to him in Ystradyfodwg itself (the parish church is dedicated to Saint John), leading some to suggest that the parish was named, not for a saint, but a local chieftain. One legend records that Tyfodwg was a chieftain promised sainthood by the monks at Penrhys.

According to Rice Rees Tyfodwg was one of the associates of Cadfan (presumably Saint Cadfan), though the family line in the Cambrian Biography, is inconsistent with known chronology. His patronal feast is kept on 25 June.
