= Llanwenarth =

Village in Monmouthshire, Wales

Coordinates: 51°49′N 3°03′W

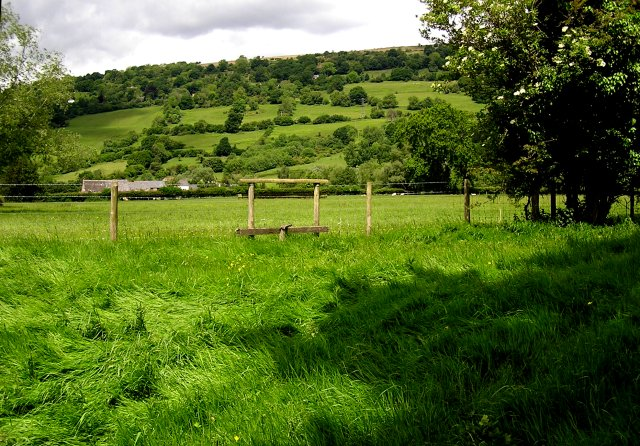
Farmland near Llanwenarth

Llanwenarth is a small village and parish in the Usk Valley of Monmouthshire, south-east Wales, United Kingdom. It is in the community of Llanfoist Fawr and covered by the electoral ward of Llanwenarth Ultra.

== Location ==
Llanwenarth is located two miles (3 km) west of the market town of Abergavenny, close to the banks of the River Usk.

== History and amenities ==
St Peter's Church is the parish church: an ogival-headed priest's doorway in the chancel, and two windows with reticulated tracery are assigned to the fourteenth century, and a lancet in the west wall of the nave seems to be from the thirteenth, where a square tower with battlemented top was added later. The village once had a Victorian schoolhouse (now demolished). The village, which has the full name of Llanwenarth Citra, sits in flattish grassy pastures between the Blorenge mountain and the Sugar Loaf Mountain, Wales. Some of these meadows have been designated a Site of Special Scientific Interest (SSSI). Llanwenarth House was built in the 16th century and is operated as a hotel, located to the west of nearby Govilon.

The busy A40 Abergavenny to Brecon road passes along the valley side above the flood plain of the River Usk, and Nevill Hall Hospital is situated close by on the outskirts of Abergavenny town.

The annual Abergavenny and Border Counties Show, similar to Monmouth Show, used to be held on the fields close to the church until the 1990s.

An old cable ferry (similar to Hampton Loade Ferry on the River Severn) used to be used in Victorian times to cross the River Usk from a field on the Abergavenny/Llanwenarth side to the Govilon side of the river, where the bank was referred to as 'Llanwenarth Ultra.'
