= St Twrog's Island =

Tidal island in Severn estuary

Native name: Ynys Twrog
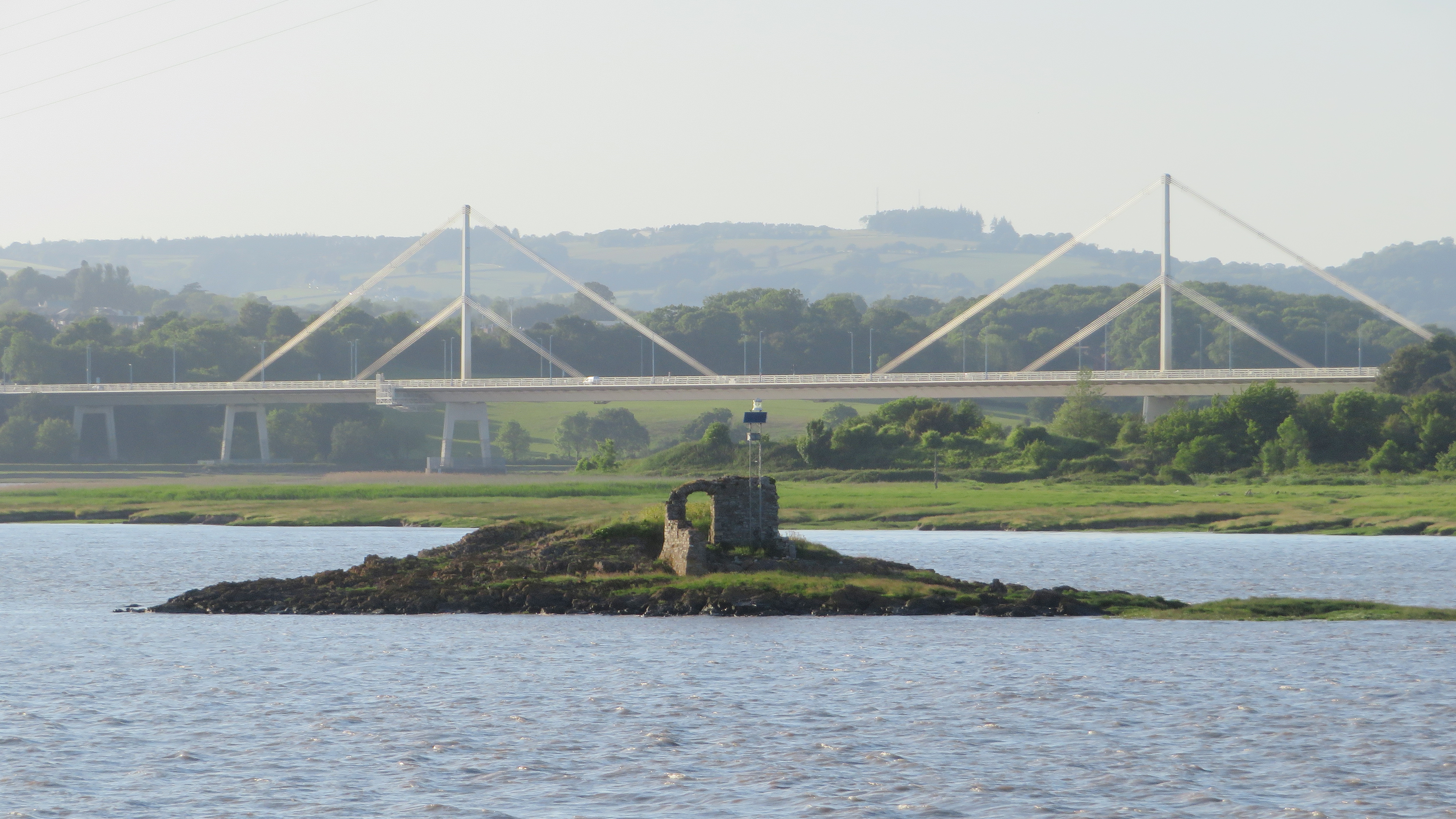
- The island at high tide, showing St Twrog's Chapel and light

- Location within Wales

Geography
- Coordinates: 51.60°N 2.65°W
- Highest elevation: 5 m (16 ft)

Administration
- Wales

St Twrog's Island (Welsh: Ynys Twrog) is a small tidal island in the Severn estuary near the Severn Bridge and half a mile south-west of Beachley, Gloucestershire. Access to the island is frequently cut off by the tidal waters of the estuary. It is also known in English as St. Tecla's Island, Chapel Island and Chapel Rock

== Description ==
The island may accessed by tidal crossings, walking across seaweed covered rocks during a two hour period around low tide. The island's high point is less than five meters with the fragmented wall and arched window of the chapel ruins centrally located among the sparse grassland found above the high-tide line.

The island lies between the Severn Bridge and the Prince of Wales Bridge, laying just south of the first. The island and its ruins can be seen on your left as you drive into Wales along the M48.

== History ==
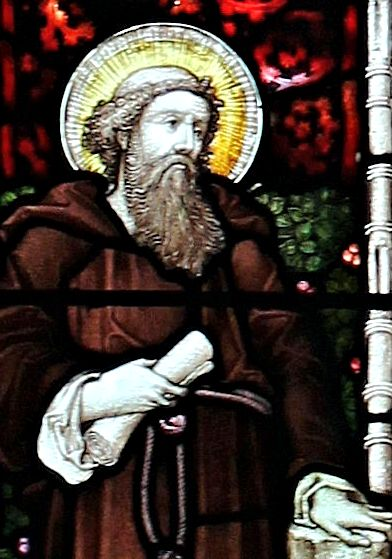
Saint Twrog who is said to have lived on the island in the 6th-7th centuries

A much older chapel is said to have been built on the island to house the anchoress, Saint Tecla (Treacla) sometime in the 4th-5th century. According to Welsh legend, Tecla was a princess and daughter to a King of Gwynedd named as Requli or Reguli. She is associated with another holy well in Gwynedd at Llandegla ("the Llan of Saint Tecla"), but it is said that she abandoned her father's kingdom in order to isolated herself and seek out a religious life on the island until she was murdered in her cell by pirates.

Saint Tecla's cell was reoccupied in the 6th-7th century by the Breton Saint Twrog, who kept a beacon burning on the island to warn sea vessels of the dangerous rocks surrounding the island. The island became well-known for the healing properties of a holy well, which saw the ancient chapel rebuilt sometime after.

The remain found on the island today date back to the 13th century and a chapel on the island is recorded in 1290. It was a popular destination for pilgrims in the fourteenth century and offerings at the chapel were valued at £10 in 1400. A papal bull of 1405 described how "a multitude both of English and Welsh" were resorting to the chapel , with historical records of the Aust Ferry showing huge numbers using it to access the island's chapel.

By 1535 however, the island's fortunes had declined measurably, possibly as a result of difficulty accessing it through rising sea levels. The chapel was described as worthless "because it stands in the sea", although it would still be valued at 26s. 8d. by the diocesan survey in 1536.

The chapel was in ruins by the 18th century. The remain found on the island today include a few walls and an archway dating back to the 13th century, although the holy well is still extant inside the ruined chapel.

While Saint Twrog is said to have warned sea vessels of the dangerous rocks around the island by keeping a beacon burning, the island became home to a modern lighthouse in 1907 when a small navigational light was constructed among the chapel ruins. Today the light is an eight meters tall, solar-powered light on a metal lattice-framed structure.

== Origin of Beachley ==
Historical records simply use the latin name "Capella in Sabrina" (The chapel in the Severn) for the chapel, with the name "St. Treacle's Chapel" being an English corruption found in local guide books. William Worcester called it "Capella Sancti Teriachi Anchorita" and the island "Rok Seynt Tryacle" while John Leland recorded the island as "Saint Tereudacus's Isle". The island has been suggested as the original "Beach ley" from which the town takes its name, either as a corruption of "Betteslé" from the Welsh "Bettws" (a chapel) and "Lir" (sea-water) or as a partial calque of another name, "Traeth-Lle", (meaning a place on the beach).
