= Devauden Festival =

Music festival in Monmouthshire, Wales

The Devauden Festival is an annual music festival based in the Wye Valley National Landscape, Monmouthshire, Wales. It features emerging and established musicians performing original music and a DJ stage, as well as hosting arts and crafts stalls, a children's area and a wellness area.

== History ==
The Devauden Festival was founded in 2010 by Jeremy Horton and the committee of the Hood Memorial Hall, the village hall in Devauden. Its initial aim was to raise funds for the upkeep of the Hood Memorial Hall. It has run every year since then apart from in 2020 and 2021 due to the COVID-19 pandemic.

The Welsh Government recognised the festival as a growth event for Wales in 2023, and provided a grant to improve the experience for artists and attendees and market it to a wider audience.

In 2025 the festival moved from its original site in Devauden to a new site near Penallt.
