= Ceitho =

6th-century Welsh saint

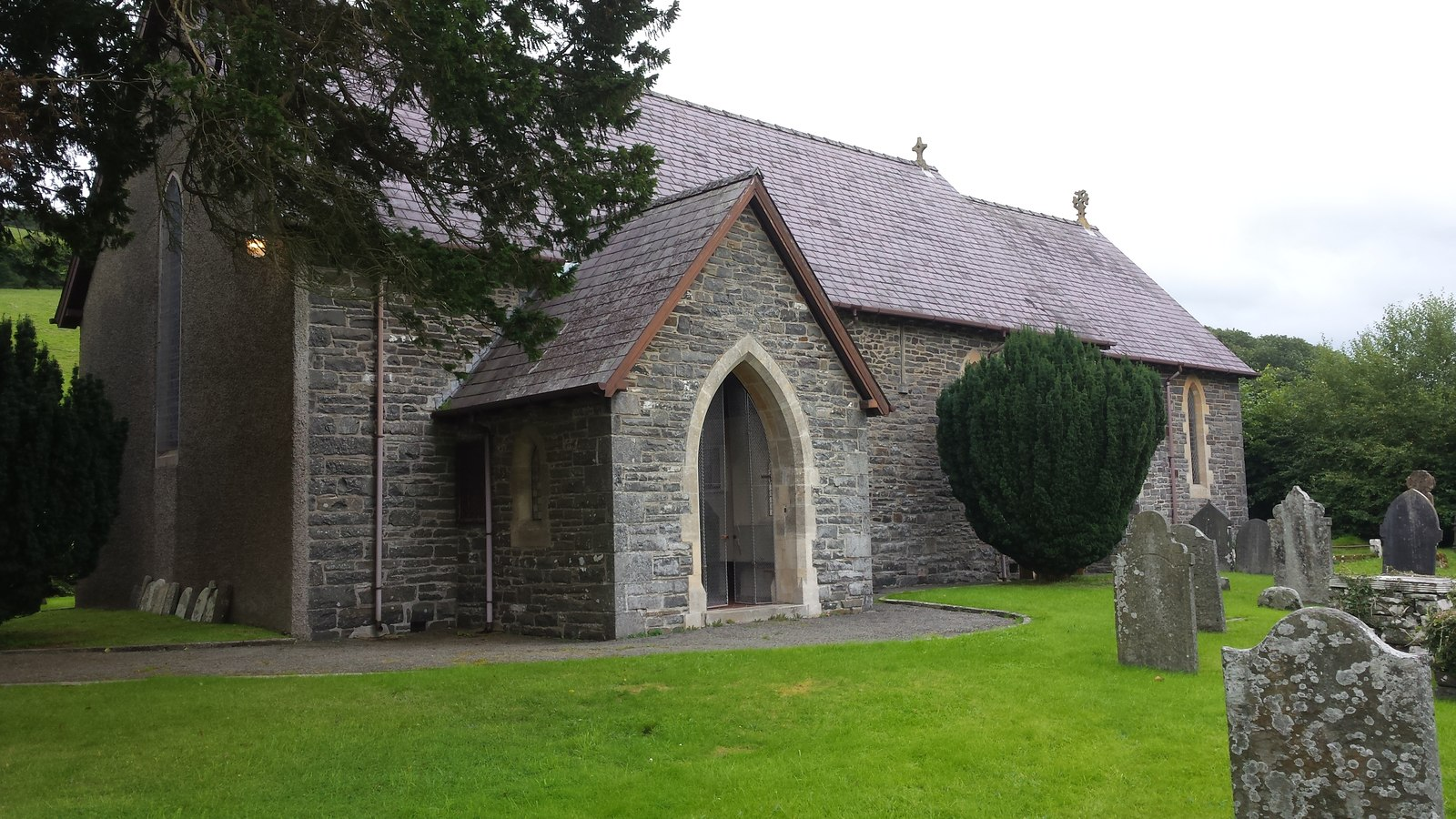
St Ceitho's Church, Llangeitho

Ceitho was an abbot and a saint living in West Wales in the 6th century. According to legend he was one of the five sons born to Cynyr Farfdrwch of Cynwyl Gaeo, and a descendant of the ancient Welsh king Cunedda Wledig. Along with his brothers Gwynno, Gwynoro, Celynin, and Gwyn, he became a saint. The five brothers are said to have founded the village of Llanpumsaint in Carmarthenshire.

Ceitho is also the patron saint of Llangeitho, Ceredigion, and is said to have founded an abbey in which he secluded himself to live as a hermit. Near the village can be found Ffynnon Geitho ('Ceitho's Well'), a natural spring which is said to run cold in summer and warm in winter.
