= St Peter ad Vincula, Pennal =

Church in Gwynedd, Wales

Church of St Peter ad Vincula
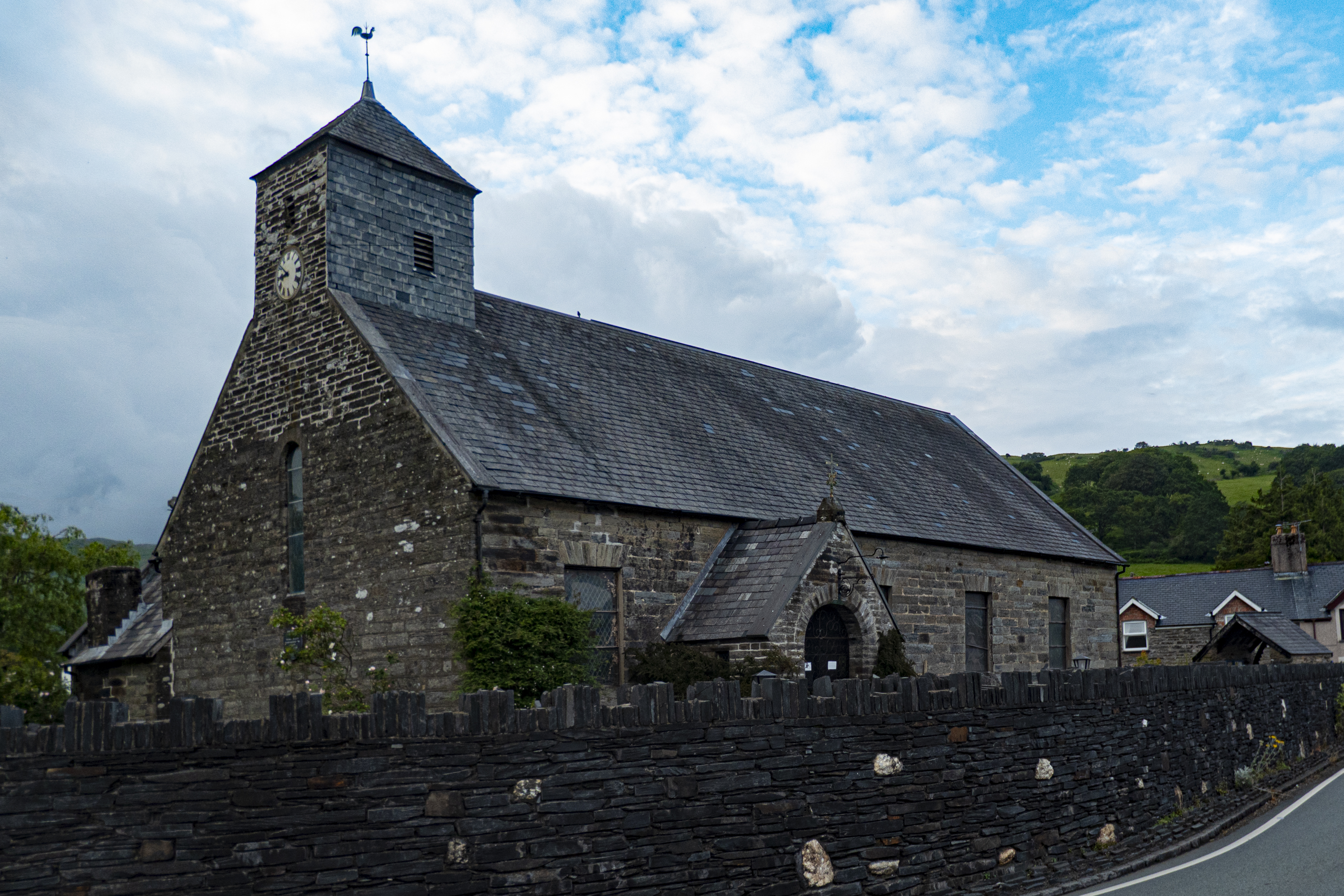
- Church of St Peter ad Vincula
- 52.58566°N 3.9205°W
- Location: Pennal, Gwynedd
- Country: Wales
- Denomination: Church in Wales
- Website: www.hearthstone.co.uk www.churchinwales.org.uk

History
- Founded: 6th century
- Dedication: Saint Peter in Chains

Architecture
- Years built: rebuilt 1700, 1761, 1810 and 1873

Administration
- Province: Wales
- Diocese: Diocese of Bangor
- Archdeaconry: Meirionnydd
- Deanery: Cyfeiliog and Mawddwy
- Parish: Pennal

The parish church of St Peter ad Vincula (meaning Saint Peter in Chains) in the village of Pennal in Gwynedd, north-west Wales, is notable as the site of the last senate meeting held by the Welsh prince Owain Glyndŵr. It was founded in the 6th century by Saints Tanwg and Eithrias, who were missionaries from Brittany, and is the only church in Wales with this dedication. It is now part of the benefice of Bro Ystumanner in the diocese of Bangor.

It is thought that the church was so named by Glyndŵr in competition with the chapel of St Peter ad Vincula in the Tower of London, one of the chapels royal of his rival, King Henry IV of England. Pennal was regarded with honour because of its status as one of the 21 llysoedd, the courts of the native Welsh Princes of Gwynedd.

A copy of Glyndŵr's "Pennal Letter" of 1406, a letter to King Charles VI of France, setting out his plans for an independent Wales, originated from Pennal. While the original letter remains in the Archives Nationales in Paris, a copy is displayed at the Parliament House in Machynlleth, and at the National Library of Wales. The letter was briefly returned to Wales from France for an exhibition at the National Library of Wales in 2000, and a campaign has since sprung up for it to be returned permanently to Wales and put on show at the Senedd in Cardiff.

A memorial garden was created in the churchyard for the native Welsh princes, during the rectorship of Rev. Geraint ap Iorwerth, who was responsible for the church from 1989 until 2012. On his departure, he claimed that the Christian Church had become "cosy club for members who abide by the rules, accepting of their place in the hierarchy". He had previously been the centre of controversy when he burned pages from the King James Bible as part of an "art experiment". The garden contains a bronze statue of Owain Glyndŵr, made by Dave Haynes of Bethesda, which was unveiled in 2004. Local celebrity Robert Plant, who had made a donation towards the cost of the statue, attended the opening ceremony. Other notable donors included Ray Gravell, Aneurin Jones and Julia Ormond.

The church is a Grade II listed building, much of which dates from the 18th century, the original medieval church having been rebuilt in 1700. The porch is built of stone from nearby Llugwy Quarry. The interior includes stained glass windows by Holland & Holt (1872) and by Ernest Penwarden (1923).

== See also ==
- Buildings associated with Owain Glyndŵr
