= St Fflewin's Church, Llanfflewin =

Coordinates: 53.372389°N 4.482285°W

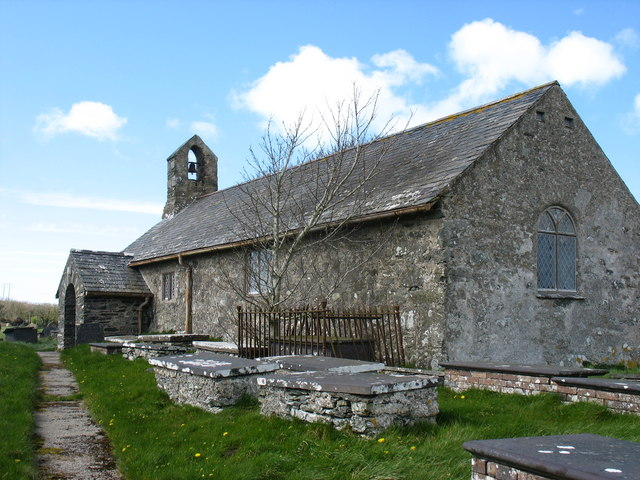
- A view from the south-east

- Location in Anglesey
- Location: Llanfflewin, Anglesey
- Country: Wales
- Denomination: Church in Wales

History
- Status: Church
- Founded: 630 (reputedly); Earliest dateable feature of present building is 18th-century
- Founder: St Fflewin (reputedly)
- Dedication: St Fflewin

Architecture
- Functional status: Active
- Heritage designation: Grade II
- Designated: 12 May 1970

Specifications
- Length: 47 ft 6 in (14.5 m)
- Width: 14 ft 9 in (4.5 m)
- Materials: Rubble masonry

Administration
- Province: Province of Wales
- Diocese: Diocese of Bangor
- Archdeaconry: Bangor
- Deanery: Twrcelyn
- Parish: Llanfechell with Bodewryd with Rhosbeirio with Llanfflewin and Llanbadrig

Clergy
- Rector: Reverend Canon G W Edwards

St Fflewin's Church, Llanfflewin (sometimes referred to as St Fflewyn's Church, Llanfflewyn) (Note: The church itself uses the version with an "i" rather than a "y", but the listed building documentation uses the version with a "y".) is a small rural church, situated by a farm in Anglesey, Wales. The first church on the site is said to have been built by St Fflewin in 630, but the present building has no structural features dating from before the 18th century, although the church has a font from the 14th or 15th century and part of an inscribed medieval gravestone has been reused in a window sill.

The church is still used for worship by the Church in Wales, and is one of five churches in a combined benefice. It is a Grade II listed building, a national designation given to "buildings of special interest, which warrant every effort being made to preserve them", because it is a "simple rural church built on Medieval foundations". A 2006 guide to the churches of Anglesey said that it is a "typical, well-preserved rural church and is well worth a visit."

== History and location ==
St Fflewin, to whom the church is dedicated, was a Christian who was active in the 6th century. He is described as the son of Ithel Hael, who came to Britain from Armorica (present-day northern France) towards the end of the 5th century. He established a Christian site at the location of the present church in 630 (according to the Diocese of Bangor and a 2006 guide to the churches of Anglesey), (Note: The diocese says that the church is "[s]ited on Christian foundations going back to 630AD". The guide says that "[t]he religious cell was founded in 630 AD by St Fflewin.") although a 19th-century guide to Wales by the writer Samuel Lewis says that it was sometime early in the 7th century. No part of a building from that period survives. There was a church here by 1254, since it is recorded in the Norwich Taxation of that year. The present building is thought by Cadw (the Welsh Government body responsible for the built heritage of Wales) to be "probably built upon Medieval foundations", albeit that the earliest dateable feature of the structure is from the late 18th century. After some repairs in the early part of the 19th century, St Fflewin's was partially rebuilt ("judiciously", says a 2009 guide to the buildings of north-west Wales) (Note: During the 19th century, most churches in north-west Wales were extensively restored or rebuilt; much of the work paid little attention to the original building, and only rarely was a more cautious approach adopted.) in 1864 and further restored during the 1930s. The Welsh poet and clergyman Morris Williams (better known by his bardic name "Nicander") was rector here from 1859 until his death in 1874; he was buried at Llanrhuddlad, one of the other Anglesey churches for which he had responsibility.

The church is isolated, located in the countryside of north Anglesey by a farm, about 1 mile (1.6 km) from Llanrhuddlad, in an area of Anglesey known as Mynydd Mechell. Llanfflewin takes its name from the church: the Welsh word llan originally meant "enclosure" and then "church", so "Llanfflewin" means "Church of Fflewin". It is set within a raised circular enclosure, with an arched lychgate (possibly of 17th-century date). It is still in use for worship, and belongs to the Church in Wales, as one of five churches in the combined benefice of Llanfechell with Bodewryd with Rhosbeirio with Llanfflewin and Llanbadrig. It is within the deanery of Twrcelyn, the archdeaconry of Bangor and the Diocese of Bangor. As of 2012, the rector is Canon G W Edwards.

== Architecture and fittings ==
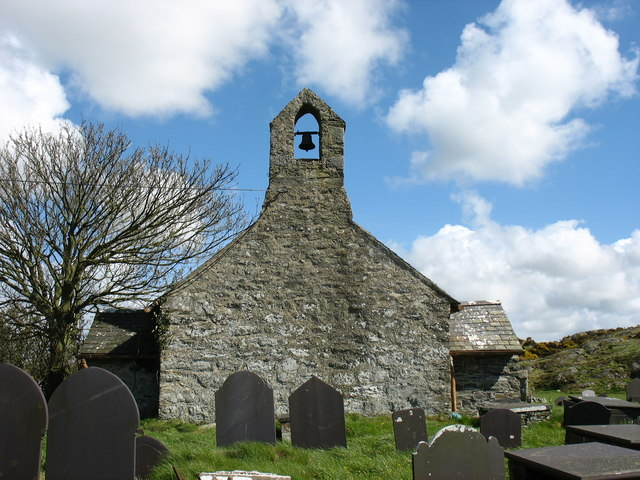
The west end of the church, with the vestry to the left and the porch to the right

The church, which is small and rectangular, has no internal division between the nave and the chancel. It measures 47 feet 6 inches by 14 feet 9 inches (14.5 by 4.5 m). It is built of rubble masonry, and the roof is made of slate; there is a gabled bellcote at the west end of the roof. The roof timbers can be seen from the inside. Entrance to the church is through a porch with a rounded arch at the west end of the south wall, and there is a vestry, with one window, at the west end of the north wall.

The windows in the south and north walls are rectangular pairs; the window in the east wall is in the form of a rounded arch, with two lights (sections of window separated by mullions). The sill of the window has a fragment of a medieval gravestone (dating from some time after 1300) set into it, inscribed HIC IACET MADOCUS. The church has a "roughly dressed" font with nine sides, dating from the 14th or 15th century. There are a number of slate memorial tablets on the north and south walls from the 18th century. A 1937 survey by the Royal Commission on Ancient and Historical Monuments in Wales and Monmouthshire also recorded a bier, with the initials "W.W." and the date 1784, and an Elizabethan silver cup with a cover-paten, the paten having an engraved date of 1574. It also noted a wooden pitch pipe and wooden shovel, both dating from the late 18th century.

== Assessment ==
The church has national recognition and statutory protection from alteration as it has been designated by Cadw (on behalf of the National Assembly for Wales) as a Grade II listed building – the lowest of the three grades of listing, designating "buildings of special interest, which warrant every effort being made to preserve them". It was given this status on 12 May 1970, and has been listed because it is "a simple rural church built on Medieval foundations". Cadw also notes that it retains "the vernacular character of a pre gothic revival church".

Samuel Lewis said that the church, which he described as "a plain edifice", was "beautifully situated near a small lake, and surrounded with pleasing scenery". The Welsh politician and church historian Sir Stephen Glynne visited the church on 4 September 1867. He said that the church "has been so completely modernised, that it is doubtful whether any original feature remains but the bell-gable and one single light window in the north wall". He said that the font was of "singular design": "octagonal, swelling downwards and each face concave." He also said that the site was "wild and striking." A 2006 guide to the churches of Anglesey says that it is "a typical, well-preserved rural church and is well worth a visit."
