= Beachley =

Village in Gloucestershire, England

Coordinates: 51.61603°N 2.64844°W

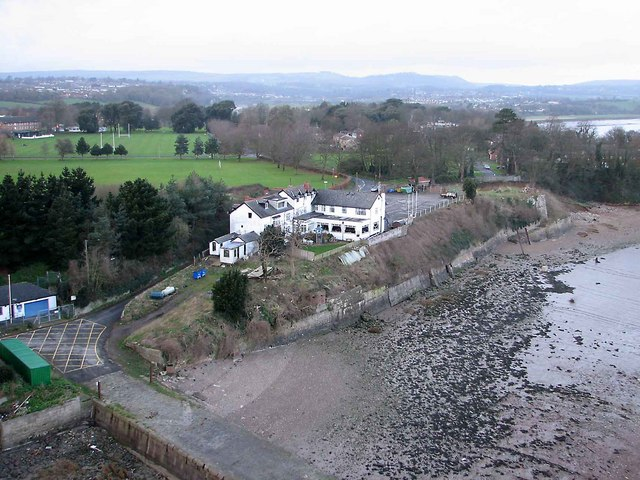
- Old ferry terminal and inn at Beachley, seen from the Severn Bridge

- Location within Gloucestershire
- Population: 764
- OS grid reference: ST551910
- Civil parish: Tidenham
- District: Forest of Dean
- Shire county: Gloucestershire
- Region: South West
- Country: England
- Sovereign state: United Kingdom
- Post town: CHEPSTOW
- Postcode district: NP16
- Dialling code: 01291
- Police: Gloucestershire
- Fire: Gloucestershire
- Ambulance: South Western
- UK Parliament: Forest of Dean

Beachley is a village in Gloucestershire, England, near the border with Monmouthshire, Wales. It is located on a peninsula at the confluence of the rivers Wye and Severn, where the Severn Bridge ends and the smaller secondary bridge over the River Wye begins, both bridges carrying the M48 motorway between England and Wales though the motorway is not directly accessible from the village. The tidal range on this stretch of water is the highest in the UK. Before the construction of the bridge it was a ferry port from where the Aust Ferry operated until 1966. The population in 2011 was 764.

== History ==
Before the 9th century, the Beachley peninsula and the mouth of the Wye were part of the Welsh kingdom of Gwent. A small chapel was founded at what was then the southernmost point of the peninsula - now a tidal island known as St Twrog's Island - traditionally in the 4th century by Tecla, a princess of Gwynedd who retired there as a hermit before being murdered by raiders from the sea. A chapel dedicated to St Twrog, perhaps containing a navigation light, was later built on the rock but was ruined before the 18th century.

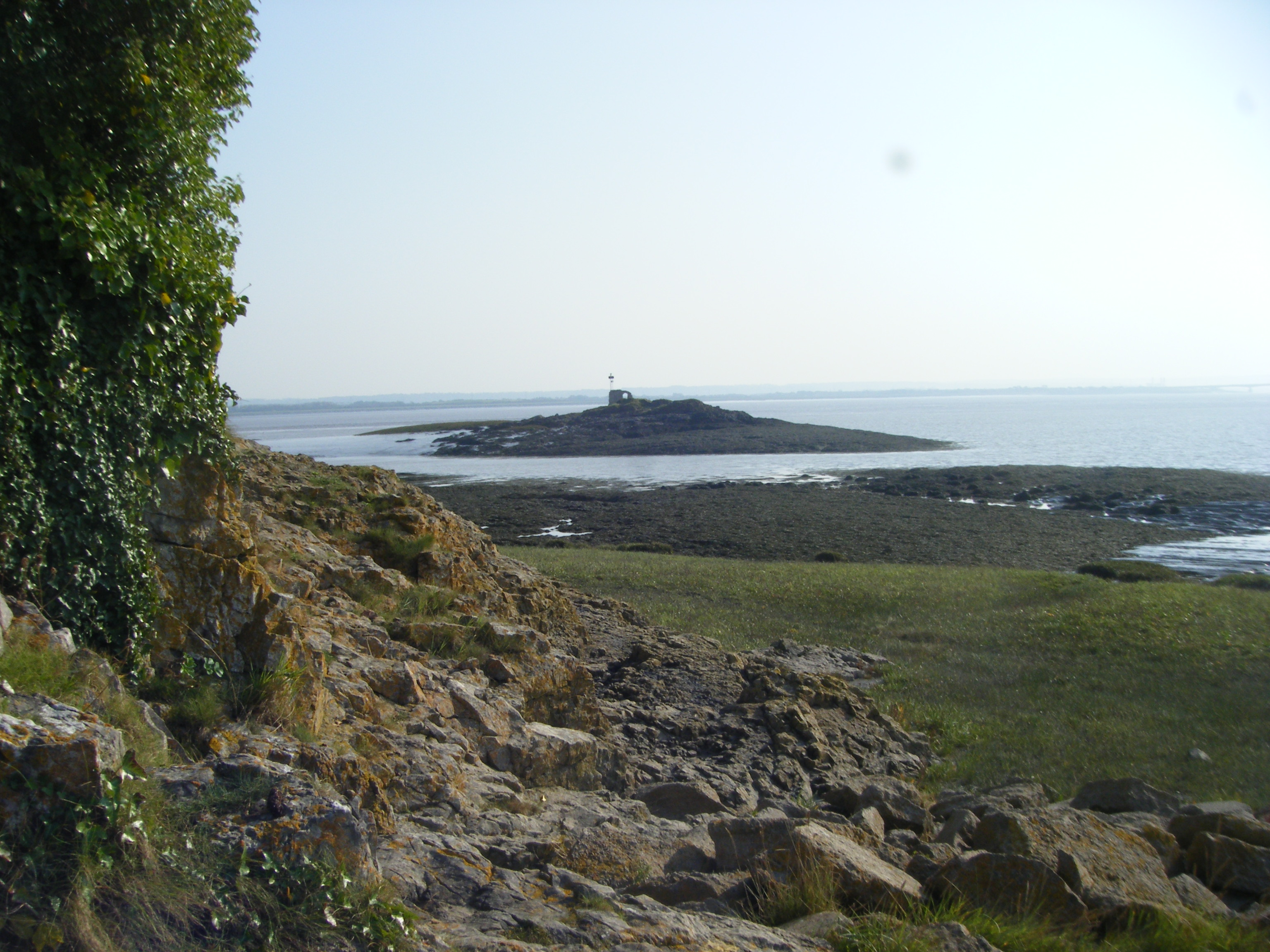
View of St Twrog's Island, showing chapel ruins

Offa's Dyke, built by the Mercians in the 8th century, cuts off the peninsula to the north. In 956, Beachley was part of lands granted by King Edwy to Bath Abbey. According to historians interpreting the writings of Walter Map, it is likely that Beachley was the site of an unprecedented meeting around 1056 between the unchallenged ruler of Wales, Gruffydd ap Llywelyn, and the king of England, Edward the Confessor, to establish each one's areas of control.

The crossing of the Severn estuary between Beachley and Aust was probably in use from antiquity and was long the chief route between southern England and southern Wales. It was recorded in the 12th century when the de Clares, lords of Tidenham, granted quittance of the passage to the monks of Tintern, and was evidently much used in 1405 when great numbers of the English and Welsh were said to resort to the nearby chapel of St Twrog. The manor of Tidenham retained rights over the passage, and received rents from the parishes of Aust and Beachley, until the 19th century.

Beachley was the site of fighting in the Civil War. It was garrisoned by Royalists under Sir John Wintour, but was overrun in October 1644 by Parliamentary forces under Col. Edward Massey.

St John's Church was built in 1833 by Bristol architects Foster and Okely. Its cost was borne largely by James Jenkins, the owner of Beachley Manor. In the 1850s the rector was Rev. G.W. Bridges, an early photographer.

=== Army Apprentices College ===
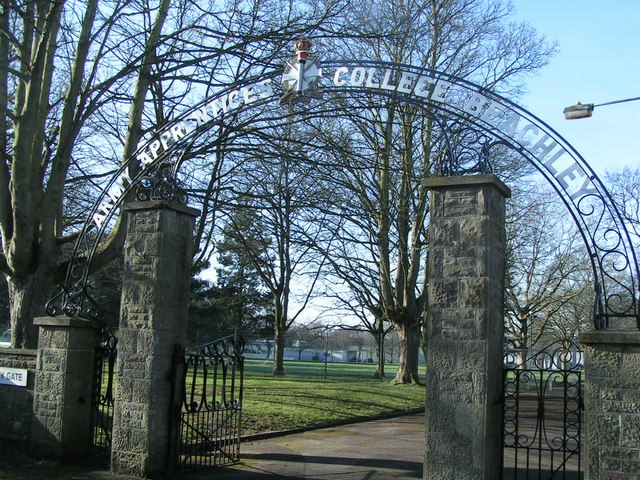
Entrance to Beachley Barracks

In 1915, during World War I, the government requisitioned a large area of land at Beachley and constructed National Shipyard No.2. However, the war ended before production had begun. Instead, in 1924 it was decided to establish a British Army Apprentices School (which in 1966 was renamed as an Army Apprentices College) at Beachley to ensure a core of qualified soldiers with excellent technical education combined with first class military training as potential NCOs and officers mainly for the specialist corps Royal Engineers, REME Plant Operator mechanics and RAOC.

The AAC closed in 1994, and the army converted the site to an infantry barracks. After the recent reorganisation of the Army, "Future Army Structures" and "Future Infantry Structures" this is now the permanent home of the First Battalion The Rifles.

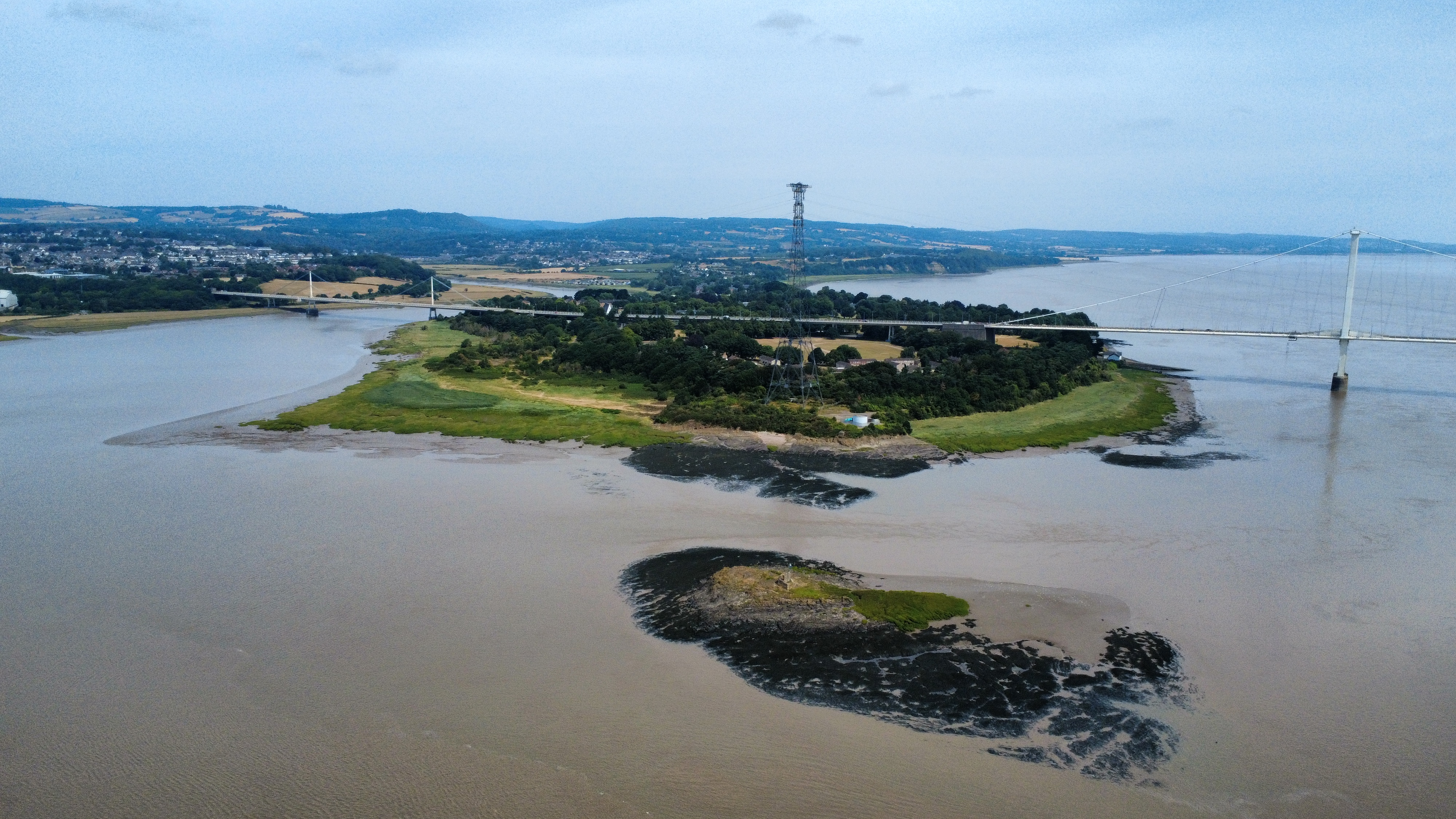
Beachley, looking north. Left is the M48 Wye Bridge joining Beachley Viaduct leading to the Severn Bridge. Beachley Pylon is central, carrying the longest powerline span in the UK to Aust. St Twrog's Island is in the foreground. The old ferry slipway slopes into the water by the Bridge on the right.

== Amenities ==
The old ferry slipway is now used by the Severn Area Rescue Association (SARA), whose Beachley lifeboat station is next to the slipway. SARA has been established for over 40 years and is considered to be the second largest UK lifeboat association (the largest being the RNLI). SARA currently operates six lifeboat rescue stations on the Severn between Newport and Kidderminster and is staffed entirely by volunteers. In addition to lifeboat duties, SARA also has cliff rescue, flood and land search capabilities. SARA is a member of Mountain Rescue England and Wales (MREW).

The Aust Severn Powerline Crossing runs over the river at Beachley to Aust. A tunnel also runs under the River Severn between Beachley and Aust carrying electric cables.

== See also ==
- Association of Harrogate Apprentices

== Sources ==
- Captain John Barnes RAEC and Major David Thomas RAEC (edd), The Story of the Army Apprentices College, Chepstow 1923-1983
- David Verey, Gloucestershire: The Vale and Forest of Dean, The Buildings of England, edited by Nikolaus Pevsner, 2nd ed (1976) ISBN 0-14-071041-8
