= Maël (saint) =

Breton saint

Saint Maël
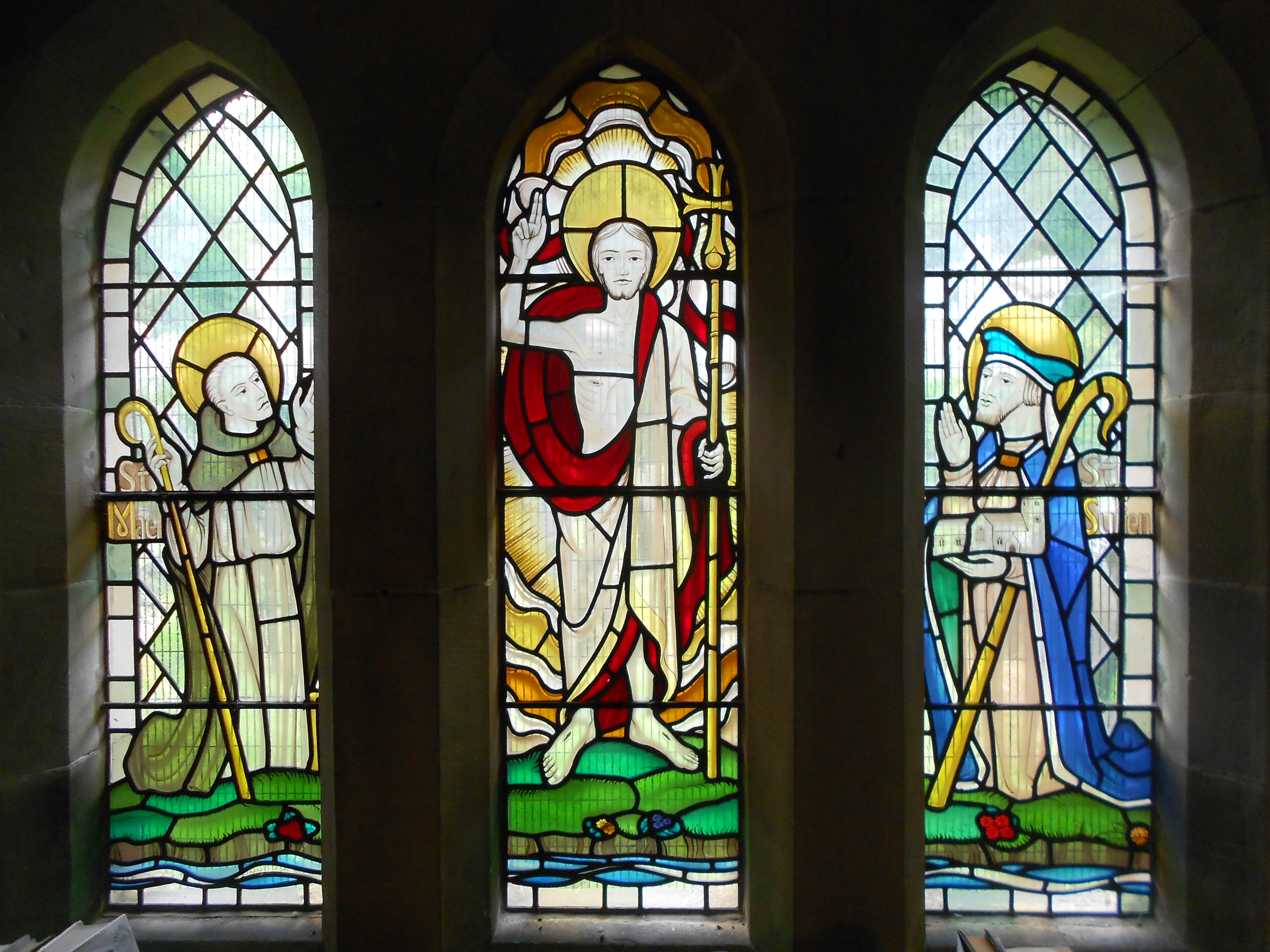
- Mael (left) depicted with Sulien (right) as co-patron of Corwen, with Christ in the centre.

Hermit
- Born: Brittany
- Died: Isle of Bardsey
- Venerated in: Anglican Communion; Roman Catholic Church; Eastern Orthodox Church
- Canonized: Pre-Congregation
- Feast: 13 May
- Patronage: Corwen

Maël was a fifth-century Breton saint who lived as a hermit in Wales. He was a follower of Cadfan from Brittany to Wales, ultimately to the Isle of Bardsey. His feast day is 13 May.

He is co-patron (with St Sulien) of Corwen in Wales, and of its parish church, part of the Anglican Communion Church in Wales.
