= St Peter's Church, Llanwenarth =

Coordinates: 51.8272°N 3.0525°W

St Peter's Church, Llanwenarth, Monmouthshire
- Church of St Peter
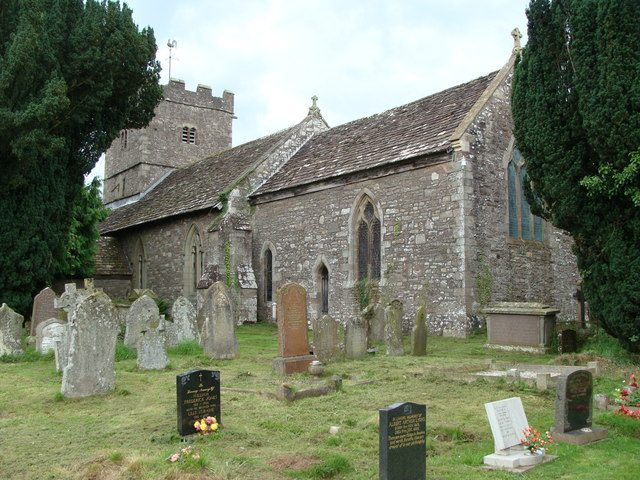
- The nave and tower

- Location in Monmouthshire
- Location: Llanwenarth, Monmouthshire
- Country: Wales
- Denomination: Church in Wales

History
- Status: Parish church
- Founded: C14th century

Architecture
- Functional status: Active
- Heritage designation: Grade II*
- Designated: 9 January 1956
- Architectural type: Church

Administration
- Diocese: Monmouth
- Archdeaconry: Monmouth
- Deanery: Abergavenny
- Parish: Llanwenarth Citra

Clergy
- Vicar: The Reverend Canon M Soady

The Church of St Peter, Llanwenarth, Monmouthshire is a parish church with reported origins in the 6/7th centuries. The current building dates from the early 14th century. Rebuilt in the 19th century, it was listed Grade II* in 1956. It remains an active Church in Wales church in the parish of Llanwenarth Citra.

== History ==
The church's foundation is reputed to date from the 6/7th centuries but the present building was begun in the early 14th century. The tower has a construction date of 1631 although Cadw reports that it may be late-medieval in origin. The church was remodelled in 1877 by John Prichard and it remains an active parish church and a Grade II* listed building.

== Architecture and description ==
The church is of Old Red Sandstone and is of a relatively large size. The style is Decorated Gothic. The interior contains a font which the architectural historian John Newman describes as "a very basic Norman tub". Most of the furnishings are by Prichard. In the nave is a late 18th-century monument by Walker of Bristol.
