= Penallt Old Church =

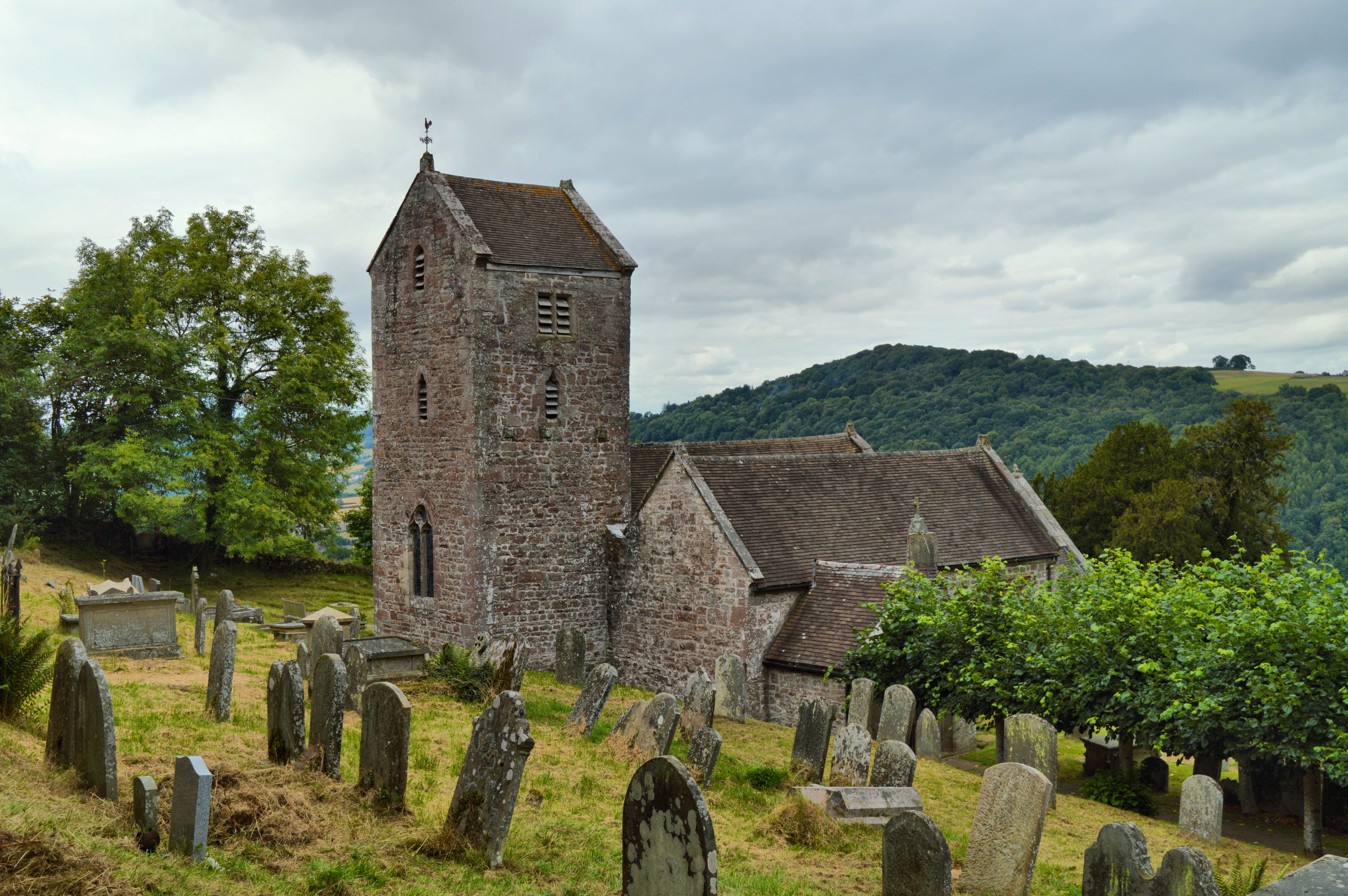
- Penallt Old Church
- 51.7932°N 2.6945°W
- Location: Monmouthshire
- Country: Wales
- Denomination: Church in Wales

History
- Status: Grade I listed

Architecture
- Years built: late 13th/early 14th century

Administration
- Diocese: Monmouth

Penallt Old Church is located just outside the village of Penallt, Monmouthshire, Wales. It is a Grade I listed building as of 19 November 1953.

== History and architecture ==
The church dates from the late thirteenth century or early fourteenth century and its dedication is unknown. The main part of the building is medieval, although the base of the tower is earlier, and the porch is later, bearing a date of 1539. The church was restored in 1885-7 and again in 1951. It is constructed of Old Red Sandstone.

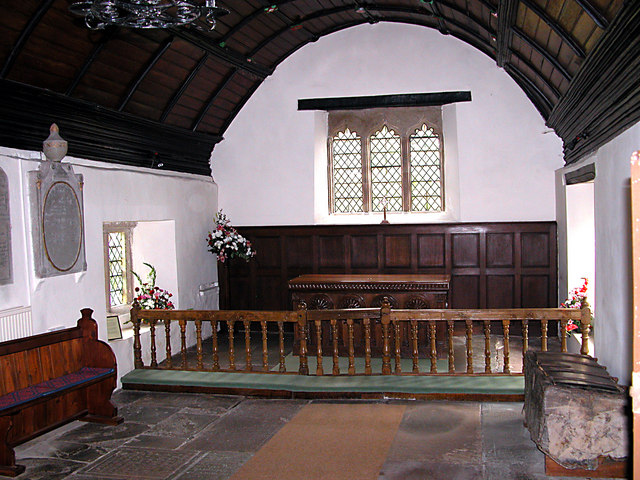
The interior of the church

The interior has a barrel-shaped ceiling from the sixteenth century and a four-bay Perpendicular arcade. It also contains an elaborate coat of arms of Queen Anne, dating from 1707. The altar table was carved in 1916 by a war refugee from Belgium, who was reputed to be a master carver at St. Rumbold's Cathedral in Mechelen.

Services are still held at the church on Sundays.

== Sources ==
- Jenkins, Simon (2008). Wales: Churches, Houses, Castles. London: Penguin. ISBN 978-0-713-99893-1.
- Newman, John (2000). Gwent/Monmouthshire. The Buildings of Wales. Penguin. ISBN 0-14-071053-1.
