= St Cadoc's Church, Penrhos =

St Cadoc's Church, Penrhos, Monmouthshire
- Church of St Cadoc

- Location in Monmouthshire
- 51.8013°N 2.8483°W
- Location: Penrhos, Monmouthshire
- Country: Wales
- Denomination: Church in Wales

History
- Status: Parish church
- Founded: c15th century

Architecture
- Functional status: Active
- Heritage designation: Grade II*
- Designated: 27 November 1953
- Architectural type: Church

Administration
- Diocese: Monmouth
- Archdeaconry: Monmouth
- Deanery: Raglan/Usk
- Parish: Penrhos

Clergy
- Vicar: The Reverend Heidi Price

The Church of St Cadoc, Penrhos, Monmouthshire is a parish church with its origins in the 15th century. Restored in the 19th century, it remains an active parish church, and has recently undergone major renovation. The church is a Grade II* listed building.

== History ==
The church is 15th century in origin, in a Perpendicular style. The church was restored in 1848 and again, under the direction of the architect John Prichard, in 1878. The tower was restored in 1905. By 2016 the church was in a poor state of repair and the nave was inaccessible, due to safety concerns. Restoration works have now been completed, supported by a grant of £121,00 from the Heritage Lottery Fund.

== Architecture and description ==
The church is built of Old Red Sandstone. The style is Perpendicular.
