= St Tanwg's Church, Llandanwg =

St Tanwgs, Llandanwg
- The Church in the Sand
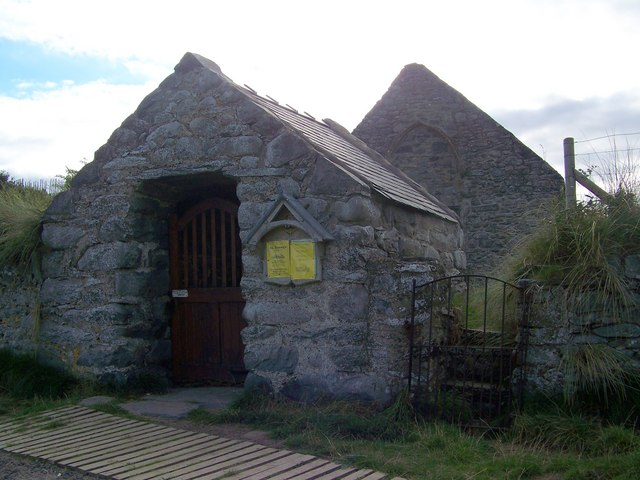
- St Tanwg's church with the lych gate in the foreground
- St Tanwgs, Llandanwg
- 52.832615°N 4.125985°W
- Location: Llandanwg, Gwynedd
- Country: Wales
- Denomination: Anglican

History
- Dedication: St Tanwg

Architecture
- Functional status: active

Administration
- Province: Church in Wales
- Diocese: Bangor
- Archdeaconry: Meirionnydd
- Deanery: Meirionydd Synod
- Parish: Bro Ardudwy

Clergy
- Rector: Rev. Anthony Hodges

Listed Building – Grade I
- Official name: Church of St Tanwg
- Designated: 30 November 1966
- Reference no.: 4790
- Community: Llanfair
- Principal area: Gwynedd

St Tanwg's Church, Llandanwg, also known as "the church in the sand", is an early medieval church dedicated to St Tanwg in the village of Llandanwg, Gwynedd, Wales. The church is a Grade I listed building.

== Location ==
The church is located in sand dunes, about 20m from the high water mark of St George's Channel, (Note: In 1911, the church was described as being 1 mile (1,600 m) from the high water mark.) at the southern end of the village of Llandanwg. It is also known as "the church in the sand". To the south west of the church is the mouth of the River Artro.

== History ==
The current building is medieval, with the western end possibly dating back to the 13th century. However, the presence of 6th century inscribed stones, and the dedication to St Tanwg, suggest much earlier use of the site as a church, possibly dating to around 453 AD as part of Saint Patrick's work to establish links between Ireland and Britain.

St Tanwg's was extended to the east, including a tall east window and the addition of a rood screen, in the 15th century. The church was restored in the 17th century when windows were rebuilt and changed. This was also probably when a choir loft was removed and floor beams moved to the back of the church. The initials REP and date 1685, which are cut into a cross incised stone on the west gable, may date this period of alteration. The first recorded incumbent for the parish was Rector Thomas Humphrey in 1662.

The floor of the church was flagged in 1786 and, three years later, some medieval paintings were lost during replastering and repainting of the walls. St Tanwg's had been the parish church for the parish of Llandanwg, (Note: The living of the parish of Llandanwg was a rectory with the perpetual curacy of Llanbedr annexed and was in the patronage of the Bishop of Bangor. The parish was in the hundred of Ardudwy, in the county of Merioneth.) which included the small town of Harlech, for hundreds of years but between 1839 and 1841 a new parish church (also dedicated to St Tanwg) was built in Harlech. The old church was abandoned, and the 15th century octagonal font, bell (Note: The bell was later replaced in 1922 by Sir Charles Phibbs, with an old bell from Doobeg, County Sligo, Ireland.) and other furnishings, removed to the new building. The church soon fell into disrepair, with roof tiles lost, and the roof at the west end falling in. The church filled with sand and was used by fishermen who hung their nets on the altar rail. In 1884 the church was re-roofed for £80 by the Society for the Protection of Ancient Buildings, who had raised an appeal for funds.

Since then, more work has been done on various occasions, with a major restoration costing £20,000 in 1987.

== Architecture ==
St Tanwg's church is a simple rectangular building, 57 feet (17 m) long (west-east) and 23 feet (7.0 m) wide (north-south), with a continuous nave and chancel. The nave is probably 13th century, with the chancel added in the 15th century. The church is built of local rubble stone with larger stone quoins and gritstone dressings. The roof is of slate with rough stone dressings.

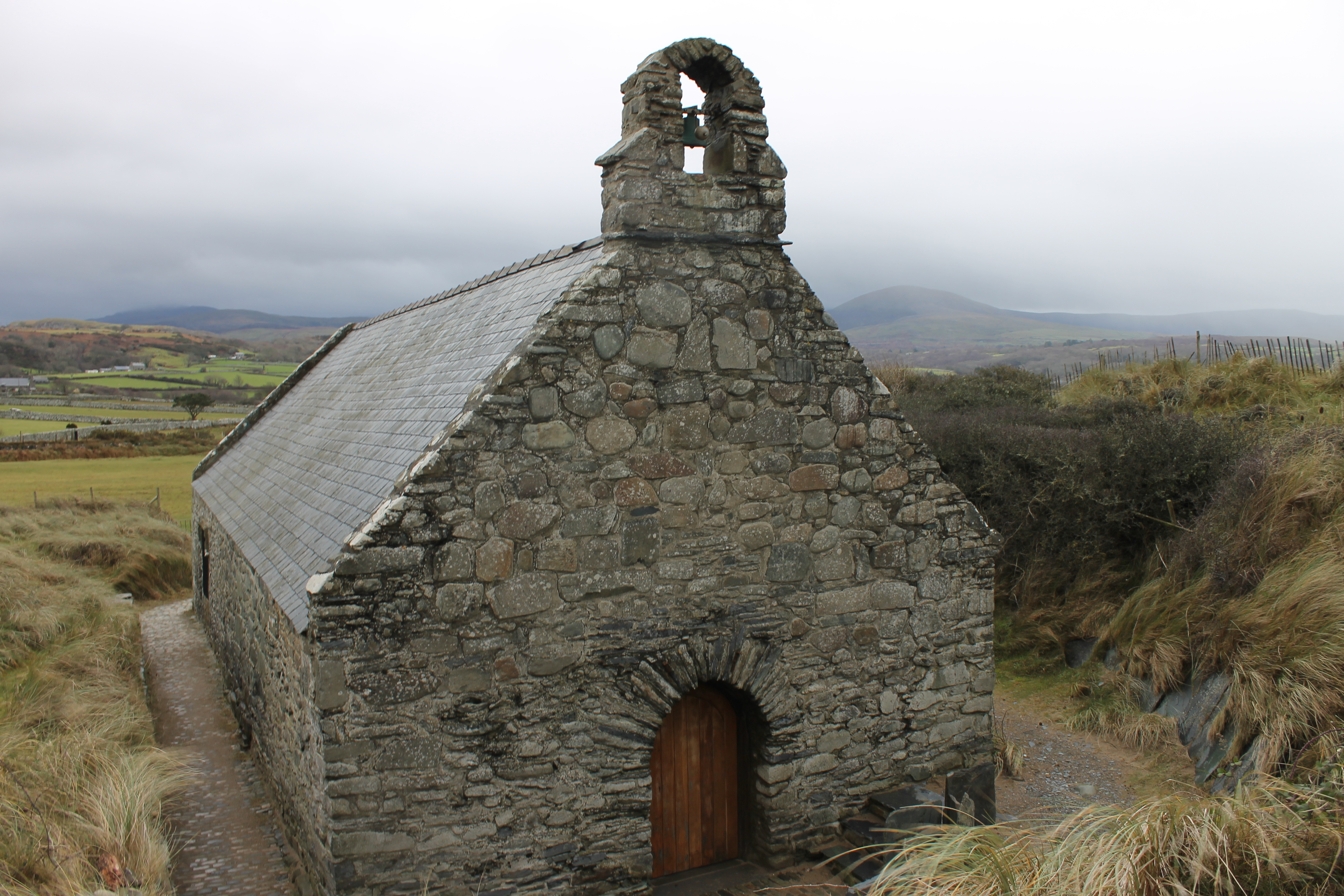
West wall and entrance

The church is accessed through a door in the west wall. The doorway is arched with radiating quoins. There was probably once a gabled porch above the doorway, indicated by the stonework above the entrance. Above the door, on the roof, is a small bellcote, housing one, undated, bell.

The south wall includes a blocked off door from the 13th century, a window added to the nave in the 17th century, and a window in the 15th century chancel.. The north wall includes a window added to the nave in the 17th century, and a window in the 15th century chancel.

The east wall was added as part of the 15th century extension of the building and included a tall window, which was replaced by a smaller window in the 17th century.
