= Saint Trillo =

Welsh saint

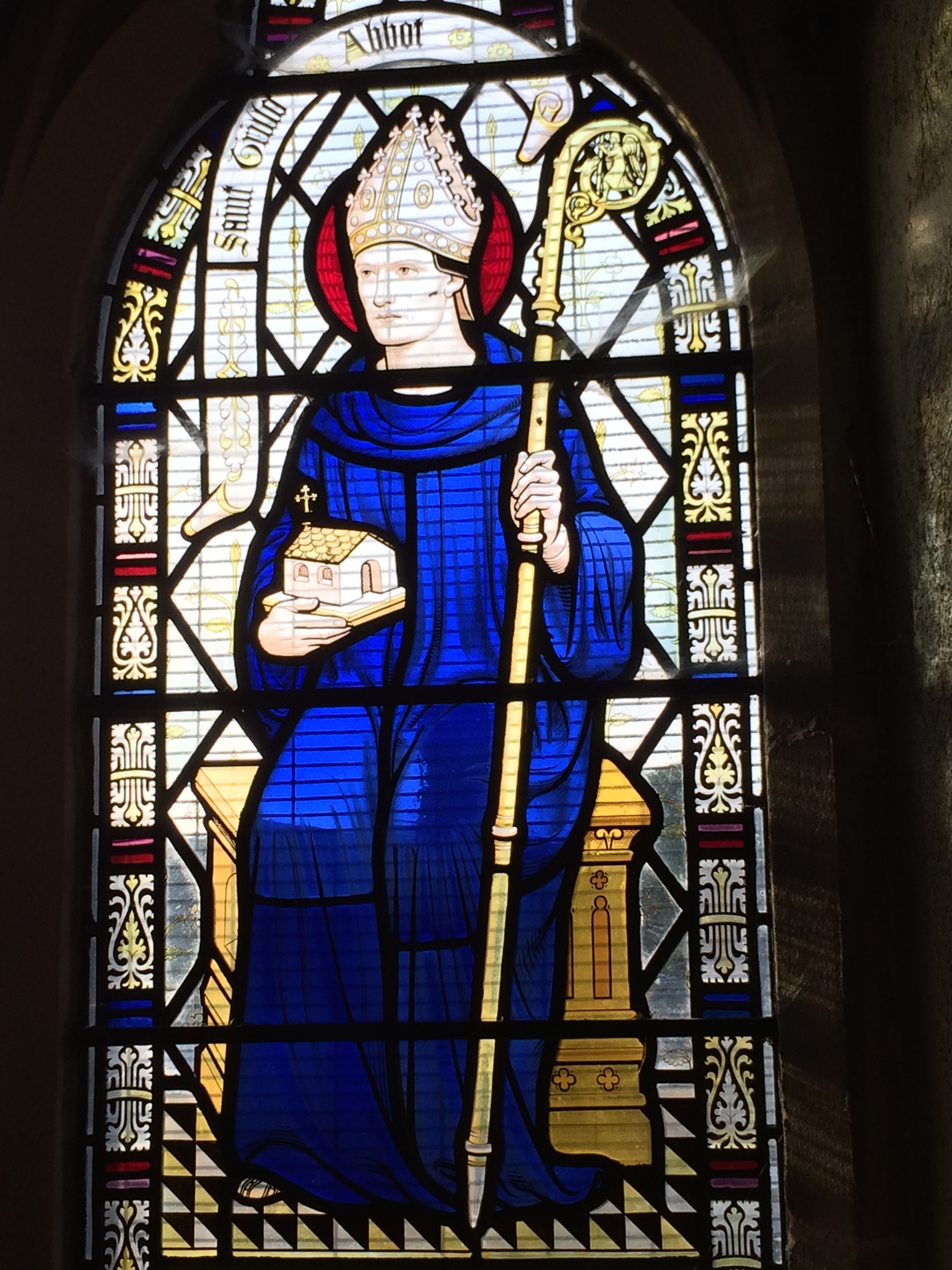
- St Trillo depicted in the Parish Church of St Trillo, Llandrillo, Wales.

Abbot
- Born: 6th century Brittany
- Died: 6th century
- Feast: 15 June

Saint Trillo is the patron saint and founder of the churches at Llandrillo, Denbighshire and Llandrillo yn Rhos, Rhos-on-Sea in Conwy County Borough, Wales.

According to Enwogion Cymru, Trillo was a saint who lived in the early part of the sixth century. He was one of the sons of Ithel Hael.

Trillo was nobly born in Brittany and went to Wales with his brothers Saint Tegai and Saint Twrog as a disciple and student of Saint Cadfan, who later admitted Trillo to the religious life. Trillo became an Abbot and church-founder, noted for his holiness. He was buried on Bardsey Island.

His church at Llandrillo contains representations in stained glass of some of the stories of Trillo's life. The glass was commissioned in the 1920s in memory of a former parish priest.

Tram no 7 on the Great Orme Tramway is named St Trillo in honour of the saint.
