= Saint Sulien =

Reputed 6th-century founder-abbot of a monastery at Luxulyan in Cornwall

- Born: c. 6th century
- Died: c. 6th century probably Luxulyan, Cornwall
- Venerated in: Christianity
- Feast: 29 July

Saint Sulien, Sulian, or Silin was the reputed 6th-century founder-abbot of a monastery at Luxulyan ("Chapel of Sulien") in Cornwall. His feast day is 29 July. He is likely the same as the Saint Sulien of Cornouaille and Domnonée. The prefix "lux" is equivalent to "loc" which means place. It is common in Brittany, but not in Cornwall, which suggests this is a Breton foundation.

== Etymology ==
Sulien is a Welsh variant of the given name "Julian," but has also been interpreted as being derived from the Welsh sul, meaning "sun" + geni, meaning "born," Sulien being the name of a Celtic solar deity.

There have probably been other Christian Celtic saints with the same (or similar) name, and a variant of it is also used as an alias of Saint Tysilio.

== Other Saint Suliens ==
Confusion has arisen between different legends of Celtic saints with the name Sulien (in a variety of spellings). The most commonly encountered are:

- Saint Sulien the Wise, bishop of St Davids.
- Saint Sulinus of East Brittany – feast day 1 October.
- Saint Suliau (of Wales) or Saint Tysilio, a Welsh prince – feast day 8 November.
- Saint Sulien and his brother (or cousin Saint Maël) of Corwen in mid-Wales.

== See also ==
- SS Mael and Sulien's Church, Corwen

== Sources ==
- "Saint Sulian: founder of Luxulyan church (?)" in: G. H. Doble, The Saints of Cornwall; part 5: Saints of Mid-Cornwall. Truro: Dean and Chapter, 1970, pp. 104–26
