= Saint Tecwyn =

Welsh saint

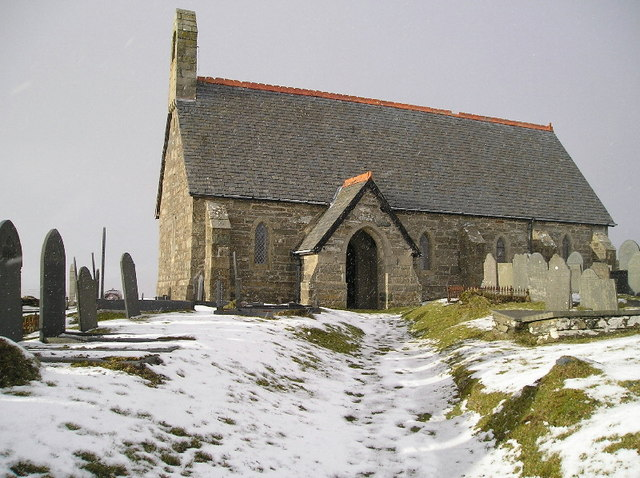
- A church from Llandecwyn the town founded by the Saint.
- Born: late 5th century
- Died: 6th century
- Venerated in: Wales
- Beatified: preconvocation
- Canonized: preconvocation
- Feast: 14 September

Saint Tecwyn is the patron saint and founder of Llandecwyn in the Welsh county of Gwynedd.

Tecwyn (sometimes transliterated as Tegwyn - feminine version Tegwen; and sometimes anglicised as Teckwyn) was a 6th-century Welsh saint who founded the church at Llandecwyn, having come to Wales early in the Age of the Saints. It is believed that Tecwyn was the brother of Saint Tanwg of Llandanwg, Saint Twrog of Maentwrog, Saint Tegai of Llandegai and Saint Baglan of Llanfaglan and Baglan.

According to Enwogion Cymru, he was the son of Ithel Hael o Lydaw of Brittany, and arrived in Britain with Saint Cadfan, in the time of Vortigern "who procured wise men and divines from Gaul, now called France, to renovate Christianity in this Island, in consequence of the decay and failure that had befallen the faith in Christ." The Breton language at this time would have been very close to the Welsh of the period. He was a member of the college of Bardsey which was founded as a monastery in 516 AD.

The church of Llanfihangel-y-traethau, a few miles to the southwest of Llandecwyn, has a window depicting Saint Tecwyn and is the start of the Saint Tecwyn's Way, a pilgrimage route between the two churches.

== Video ==
- LLANDECWYN CHURCH on YouTube
