= Cynllo =

5th- and 6th-century Welsh saint

Saint Cynllo
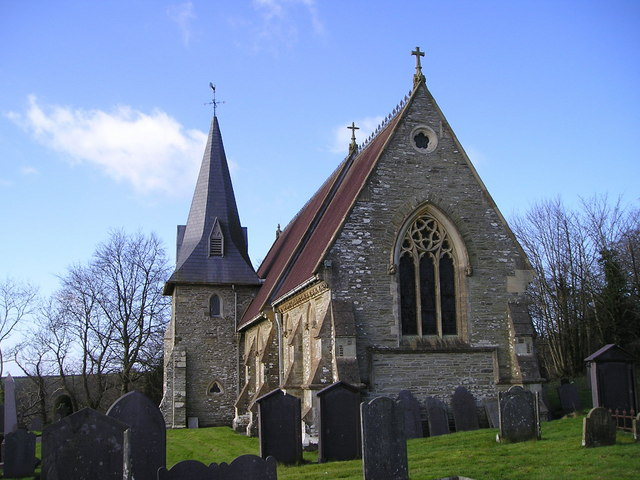
- St. Cynllo Church, Llangynllo
- Born: late 5th century Probably Brittany
- Died: 6th century Wales
- Venerated in: Roman Catholic Church; Anglican Communion; Orthodox Church
- Major shrine: Church of St Cynllo in Llangunllo, Wales
- Feast: 17 July

Cynllo (Welsh pronunciation: [ˈkənɬɔ]) is a British saint, who lived in the late 5th and early 6th centuries, generally described as a brother of Teilo. Cynllo was known for "...the sanctity of his life and the austerity of his manners."

== Life ==
Cynllo is variously described in the genealogical Bonedd y Saint as the son of Usyllt and brother of Teilo. Later genealogies have him a grandson of Coel Hen. Wade-Evans thought he should be identified with Kentinlau who accompanied Saint Cadfan from Brittany to Ceredigion. References to him as Cynllo Vrenin (Cynllo the King) suggest that he was in possession of his ancestral dominions before devoting himself to religious life.

Cynllo's knee imprints, made as he said his devotions, are said to exist in a rock, near the farm Felin Gynllo, which lies just outside Llangoedmor in Ceredigion. A Middle Welsh poem, The Consolations of Elffin, attributed to the infant Taliesin includes the line, Ni bydd coeg gweddi Cynllo, "The prayer of Cynllo will not be in vain."

Several churches are dedicated in his honour, but there is no reliable account of him. Churches and chapels were dedicated to him over almost the whole of Gwerthrynion and Maelienydd.

There is a church in Ceredigion commemorating Saint Cynllo at Llangynllo (said to stand on the site of his monastic cell) and Nantcwnlle, and also the church of St Cynllo in the community of Nantmel in the historic county of Radnorshire, now part of Powys, and at Llangynllo west of Knighton. The latter was almost totally rebuilt in the late 18th century. Cynllo was so popular that even when the Normans changed the dedication of the church in Rhayader to Saint Clements, locals still held Cynllo's feastday there.

Near St Cynllo's Church, Llanbister was a spring called Pistyll Cynllo.

== Feast day ==
By the fifteenth century St. Cynllo's feast day had been set as 17 July, although Baring-Gould, quoting the sixteenth century Haford MS, shows August 8.

Cynllo does not appear on the Roman Catholic National Calendar for Wales, although every parish is encouraged to celebrate its patronal feast. The calendar indicates that "Where no other indication is given the celebration is an optional memorial."

A new calendar for the Church in Wales was produced in 2003; Cynllo does not appear in that either although both the Catholic and Anglican calendars have a general commemoration in November for Welsh saints. Those parishes which continue to commemorate Cynllo appear to conform to the 17 July.

== Sources ==
- Haslam, Richard (1979). The Buildings of Wales: Powys.
- Wade-Evans, A. W. (1944). Vitae Sanctorum Britanniae et Genealogiae.
