= Ithel Hael =

Breton nobleman

Ithel Hael ("Ithel the Generous") or Ithel Hael o Lydaw was a prince of Armorica who lived in the early part of the sixth century. He was the father of Baglan, Flewyn, Gredifael, Tanwg, Twrog, Tegai, Trillo, Tecwyn and Llechid, saints who accompanied Cadfan to Britain.
