= Twrog =

6th-century Welsh saint

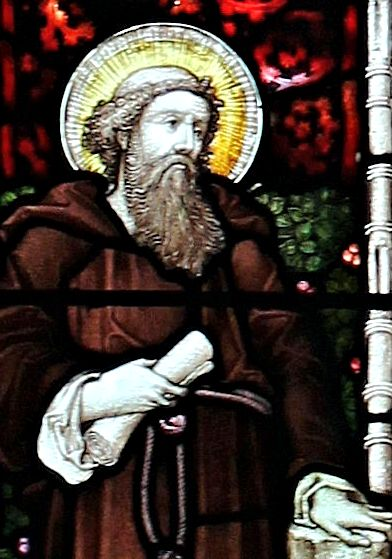
Portrait of St Twrog on the window at St twrog's Church, Maentwrog, Gwynedd, Wales

Saint Twrog - feast day 26 June - was a 6th-century Welsh saint who founded the church at Maentwrog and refounded the chapel on St Twrog's Island, having come to Wales early in the Age of the Saints.

== Early life ==
It is believed that Twrog was the son of Ithel Hael o Lydaw of Brittany. He was also the brother of Saint Tanwg of Llandanwg, Saint Tecwyn of Llandecwyn, Saint Tegai of Llandegai and Saint Baglan of Llanfaglan and Baglan.

He was a member of the college of Bardsey, which was founded as a monastery in 516 AD.

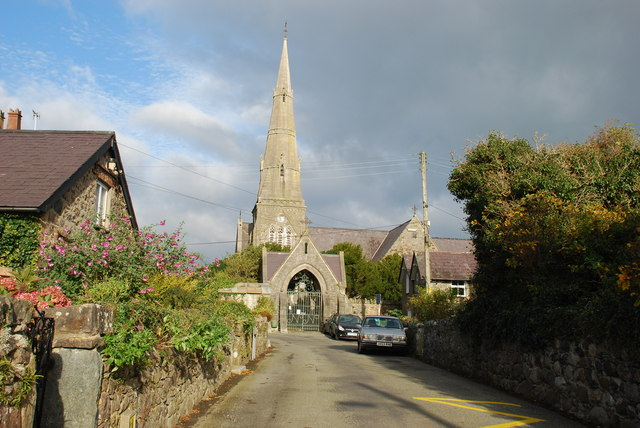
Llandwrog village centre

== Dedications ==
There are three other dedications to Saint Twrog: Bodwrog in Anglesey (St Twrog's Church, Bodwrog), Llandwrog near Caernarfon, and the ruined chapel on St Twrog's Island near Beachley by the Severn Road Bridge.

== Maen Twrog ==
When Twrog first arrived in the village now called Maentwrog, the valley was very marshy, which provided him with the wattle that he would have needed to build his cell. Outside the church, near the belfry door, is a large stone known as the Maen Twrog (maen being the Welsh for stone). Twrog is reputed to have thrown the stone from the top of Moelwyn crushing a pagan altar in the valley below. It is said that his handprints can still be seen in the stone. The parish of Maentwrog gets its name from this stone.

In the book of Welsh mythology, the Mabinogion, a hero Pryderi was killed at the Glaslyn river and is buried in Maentwrog. The boulder supposedly hurled by the saint is the one said to mark Pryderi's grave.
