= Gwynno =

Welsh saint

Saint Gwynno
- Venerated in: Roman Catholic Church; Eastern Orthodox Church; Anglican Communion
- Feast: 26 October

Gwynno, or Gwynnog ab Gildas, is the name of a 6th-century Welsh saint.

Archives at the Vatican record that his festival is 26 October; that he is regarded as a confessor; and that there is said to be a sacred well, Ffynnon Wyno, associated with Llanwonno, in Glamorganshire.

Gwynno appears to have been the son of Cau, called Euryn y Coed aur.

During the Yellow Plague of 547, the monks of the dead Illtyd went for safety from West Wales to Brittany. Instead of returning to Pembrokeshire, they travelled east to Glamorgan to settle at Llantwit Major (Llanilltud Fawr in Welsh). It appears that Saint Illtud's monks were accompanied to Glamorgan by several of his disciples and associates, some of whom were Bretons, among them Gwynno.

The Celtic bishop, Saint Dyfrig, founded three centres of learning in South East Wales - at Llancarfan (near Cowbridge), Caerworgorn (now Llantwit Major), and Caerleon. Gwynno was one of the early members of the community at Llancarfan. Under the name of Gwynno, he is considered to have been one of the three founders of Llantrisant, Glamorganshire, together with Illtyd and Dyfodwg; Llanwynno, a chapel under Llantrisant, is dedicated to him.

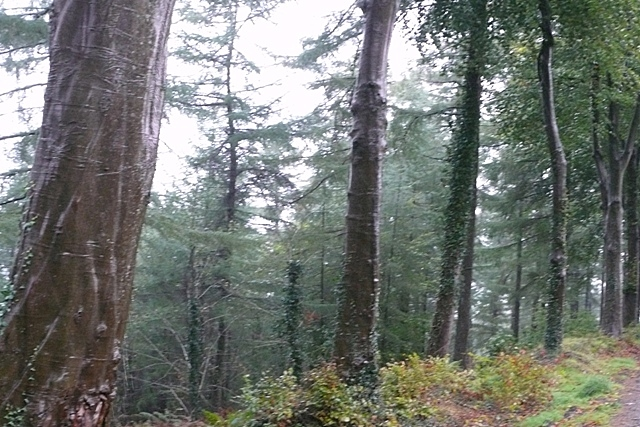
St Gwynno Forest, Llanwonno, Rhondda Cynon Taff

At Llanwonno, the farmhouse at Darwonno (Welsh: Daearwynno) was not far from the church; indeed Gwynno may have lived there, and may have owned the land around it. It is significant that the nearest farmhouse to the church was always known as Daearwynno - Gwynno's land, but it is not clear whether the land belonged to Gwynno the saint, or whether it was a later acquisition of the church. There is no mention of Gwynno ever having performed miracles; no one knows of his work, or of the whereabouts of his grave, and not one of his writings has been preserved. Only Gwynno's name and Gwynno's church remain as a definite indication that he did exist and as a monument to his work.

Llanwnog in the county of Montgomeryshire claims him for its founder under the name of Gwynnog; and in the chancel window of this church he is delineated in painted glass in episcopal habits, with a mitre on his head, and a crosier in his hand; underneath is an inscription in old English characters, "Sanctus Gwinocus, cujus animae propitietur Deus. Amen."

He is not to be confounded with Gwenog, a virgin, the saint of Llanwenog, Cardiganshire.
