= Gredifael =

Welsh 6th c. saint

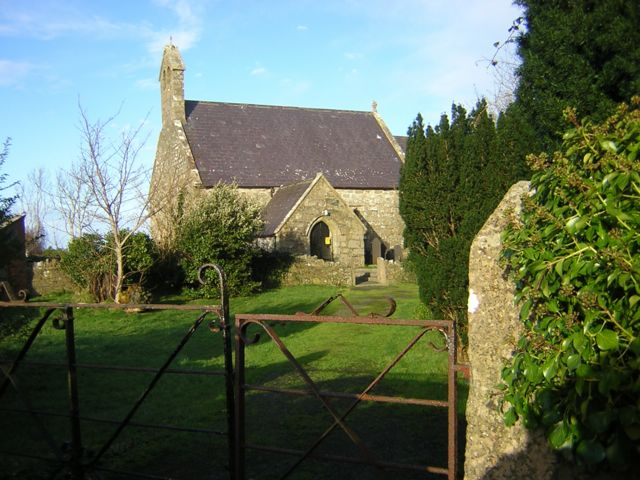
- St. Credifael's Church, Penmynydd
- Born: 6th century
- Died: 6th century
- Feast: 13 November

Saint Gredifael (also spelt Gredivel, Gredivael or Credifael) is the patron saint and founder of St Gredifael's Church, Penmynydd, in Anglesey, Wales.

According to Enwogion Cymru, Gredifael was a saint who lived in the early part of the sixth century. He was one of the sons of Ithel Hael, and with his brother Flewyn was appointed to preside over the monastery of Pawl Hen, or Paulinus, at Tygwyn ar Dav, in Carmarthenshire.
