= Saint Llechid =

6th-century Welsh Saint

Llechid
- Born: c. 556 AD; Brittany
- Feast: December 1st or 2nd
- Patronage: Llanllechid

Llechid was a 6th-century pre-congregational saint of Wales.

Born about 556 AD in Brittany, she was the child of Ithel Hael de Cornouaille and an unknown mother. Her family moved to Wales, where many of her siblings founded churches. She is the patroness saint of Llanllechid Wales, where she built a Church and where a holy well (now lost) is attributed to her. Llechid's feast day is given as either December 1 or 2nd.
