= Saint Flewyn =

6c. Welsh saint

Flewyn
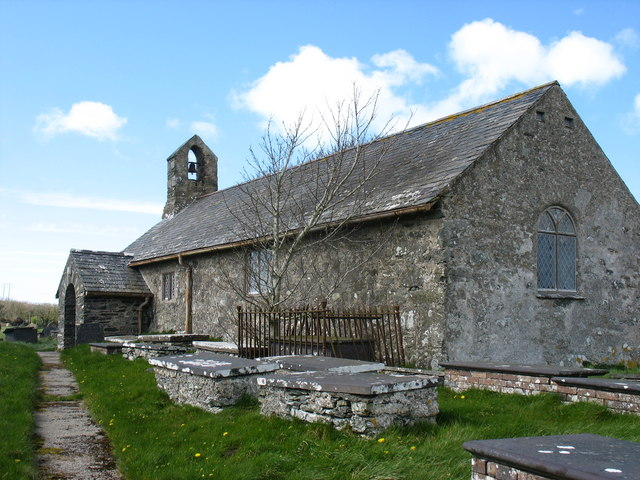
- St Fflewin Church, Llanfflewin
- Born: 6th century
- Died: 6th century
- Feast: not known

Saint Flewyn is the patron saint and founder of St Fflewin's Church, Llanfflewin, in Anglesey, Wales.

According to Enwogion Cymru, Flewyn was a saint who lived in the early part of the sixth century. He was one of the sons of Ithel Hael, and with his brother Gredifael was appointed to preside over the monastery of Pawl Hen, or Paulinus, at Tygwyn ar Dav, in Carmarthenshire.
