= Saint Tegai =

6th-century Welsh saint

Tegai
- Born: 6th century
- Died: 6th century
- Feast: not known

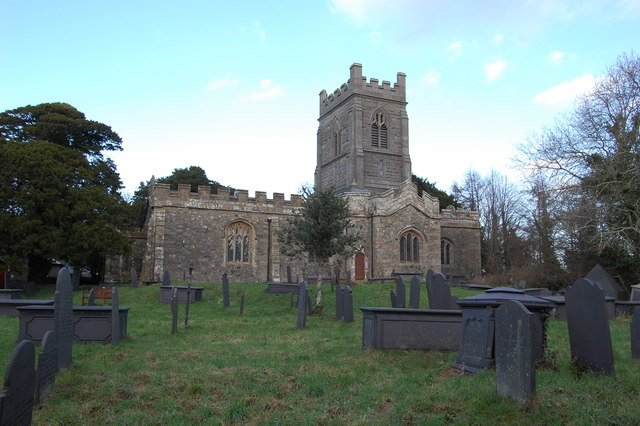
St. Tegais Church

Saint Tegai (sometimes spelt Tygai) is the patron saint and founder of Llandygai in the Welsh county of Gwynedd.

According to Enwogion Cymru, Tegai was a saint who lived in the early part of the sixth century He was one of the sons of Ithel Hael, and with his brother Tecwyn accompanied Saint Cadfan from Brittany to Wales and became a member of the college of Bardsey Island. He founded the church of Llandygai. In Achau y Saint, Tegai is called Tegai Glasog of Maelan.
