= Saint Baglan =

Welsh hermit

- Born: 6th century

Saint Baglan was a 6th-century hermit who lived at Baglan in Wales.

== Life ==
Baglan is said, on doubtful evidence, to have been a Breton prince, the son of Ithel Hael. He studied at Saint Illtud's monastic school at Llanilltud Fawr (Llantwit Major) and later travelled to the Vale of Neath as a missionary. He founded the church at Baglan and lived in a cell adjoining it.

Legend says that he was seen (either by Cadoc or Illtud) carrying fire in his robe without burning it so Illtud gave him a crozier and instructed him to build a church where he found a tree that bore three fruit. He found a tree that had a litter of pigs, a beehive, and a crow's nest; however, he preferred a spot lower down on the flat (either where St Catharine's church now stands or further out towards the bay). What was built by day was washed away by night (or disappeared at night, or was moved to the site by the tree at night). Finally, he gave in and built the church by the tree (presumably this site was rebuilt in the medieval period as St Baglan's church which is now a ruin). The crozier apparently survived until the 17th century.

== Ruined church of St Baglan ==
The ruined church of St Baglan stands in the northeast corner of the churchyard of St Catharine's church, Baglan. It was Grade II listed in 1952, and burnt down in 1954.
