= Diocese of Llandaff =

Diocese of the Church in Wales

Coordinates: 51.4958°N 3.2181°W

Diocese of Llandaff Dioecesis Landavensis Esgobaeth Llandaf

Location
- Ecclesiastical province: Wales
- Archdeaconries: Llandaff, Margam

Information
- Established: c. 560
- Cathedral: The Cathedral Church of Ss. Peter & Paul with Dyfrig, Teilo & Euddogwy, Llandaff
- Language: English, Welsh

Current leadership
- Bishop: Mary Stallard, Bishop of Llandaff
- Archdeacons: Rhod Green, Archdeacon of Llandaff; Mark Preece, Archdeacon of Margam

Map
- Map of the diocese in the Church in Wales

Website
- llandaff.churchinwales.org.uk/en/

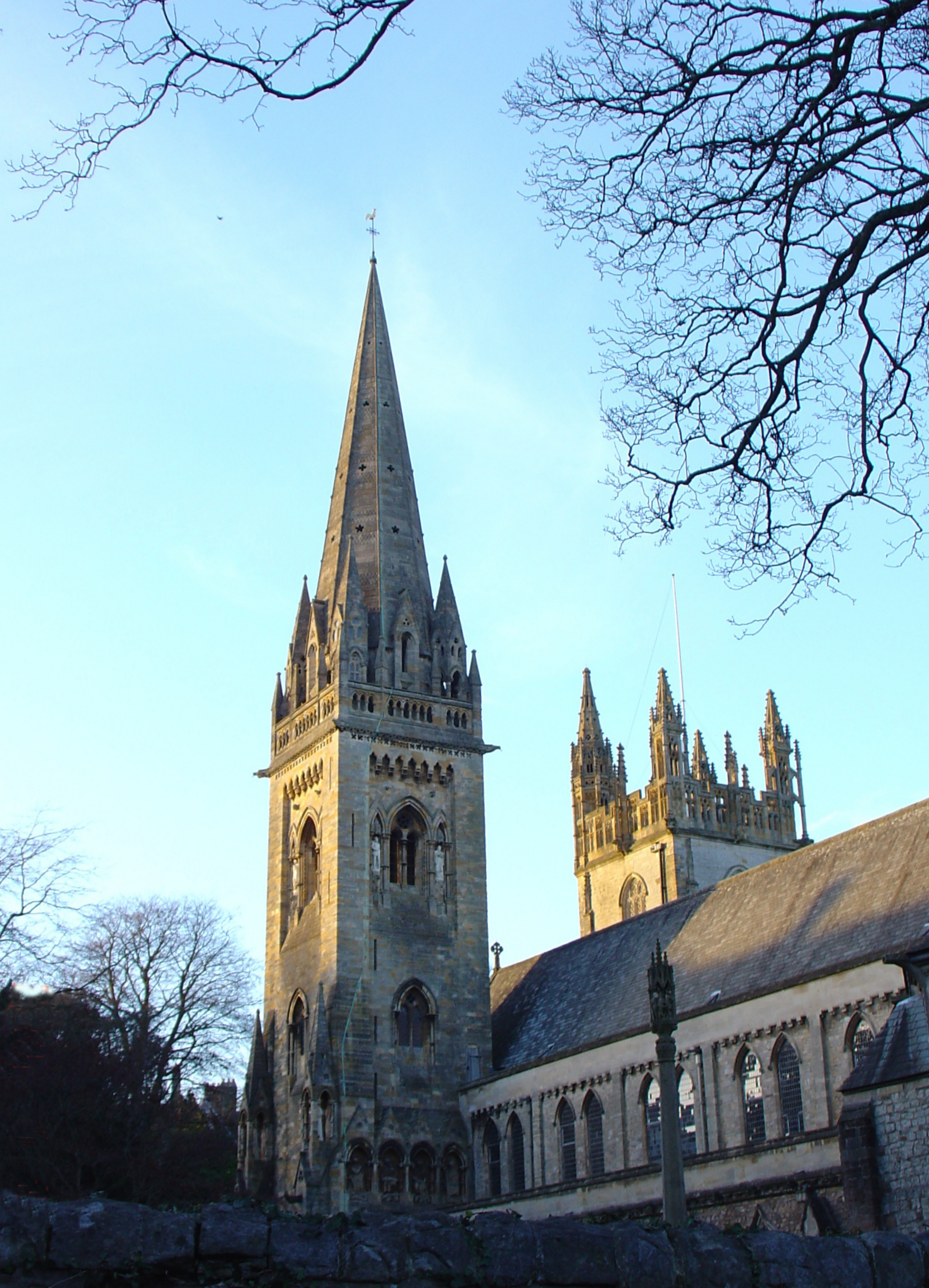
Llandaff Cathedral

The Diocese of Llandaff is an Anglican (Church in Wales) diocese that traces its roots to pre-Reformation times as heir of a Catholic bishopric. It is headed by the Bishop of Llandaff, whose seat is located at the Cathedral Church of Saint Peter and Saint Paul in Llandaff, a suburb of Cardiff. It currently covers most of the former Welsh county of Glamorgan, but once stretched from the River Towy to the middle of the Wye Valley.

== Archdeaconries and deaneries ==
The diocese of Llandaff is currently divided into two archdeaconries: Llandaff and Margam. From 2002–2020 there was a third archdeaconry, that of Morgannwg; in 2020, of its four deaneries, Pontypridd and Merthyr Tydfil & Caerphilly moved to Llandaff, and Cynon Valley and Rhondda moved to Margam. The churches in the former Deanery of Penarth & Barry moved from the archdeaconry of Llandaff to the archdeaconry of Margam in 2023.

Diocese	Archdeaconry	Deanery	Churches	Population	People/church
Diocese of Llandaff	Archdeaconry of Llandaff	Deanery of Cardiff	19	151,933	7,996
Diocese of Llandaff	Archdeaconry of Llandaff	Deanery of Llandaff	20	130,550	6,528
Diocese of Llandaff	Archdeaconry of Llandaff	Deanery of Merthyr Tydfil & Caerphilly	26	140,015	5,385
Diocese of Llandaff	Archdeaconry of Llandaff	Deanery of Penarth and Barry	18	92,180	5,121
Diocese of Llandaff	Archdeaconry of Llandaff	Deanery of Pontypridd	17	83,083	4,887
Diocese of Llandaff	Archdeaconry of Margam	Deanery of Bridgend	24	105,403	4,392
Diocese of Llandaff	Archdeaconry of Margam	Deanery of Cynon Valley	16	58,574	3,661
Diocese of Llandaff	Archdeaconry of Margam	Deanery of Margam	16	76,913	4,807
Diocese of Llandaff	Archdeaconry of Margam	Deanery of Neath	19	71,773	3,589
Diocese of Llandaff	Archdeaconry of Margam	Deanery of Rhondda	18	85,313	4,740
Diocese of Llandaff	Archdeaconry of Margam	Deanery of Vale of Glamorgan	35	30,452	870
Total/averages			228	1,026,189	4,501

Archdeacons of Llandaff

See Archdeacon of Llandaff

Archdeacons of Margam

See Archdeacon of Margam

Archdeacons of Morgannwg

- 2002–2004 (ret.): Martin Williams
- 2004–2006 (res.): David Yeoman
- 2006–2020: Chris Smith

== Pre-reformation history : Catholic bishopric ==
=== Legendary foundations ===
==== Lucius of Britain ====
A number of traditions associate Llandaff with Lucius of Britain. Lucius was believed to be a 2nd century king who first beseeched the Pope (Eleutherius) to convert him to Christianity. The Pope's response was to send a Christian mission to Britain, which would include the building of Britain's first church. The Welsh Triads relate this tradition to Llandaff, stating that Lucius "made the first Church at Llandaf, which was the first in the Isle of Britain." another triad lists "the three archbishoprics of the Isle of Britain" and states that "the first was Llandaf, of the gift of Lleirwg (Lucius), the son of Coel, the son of Cyllin, who first gave lands and civil privileges to such as first embraced the faith in Christ." Although the Lucius legend is now considered to be pseudohistory, it was recounted by Nennius, Bede and Geoffrey of Monmouth, and seems to have been widely accepted in the medieval period.

Four names are associated with the task of executing the Pope's wishes, these include the early Welsh saints Fagan, Deruvian and Elvan. Fagan is sometimes named as "the first Bishop of Llandaff" while all three became patrons of churches and villages throughout the diocese. Iolo Morgannwg also linked these early figures to Llandaff, writing extensively on this supposed early foundation. In the Iolo Manuscripts, he credits Fagan as the second Bishop of Llandaff (succeeding Dyfan, a figure Iolo conflates with Deruvian). (Note: An account in the Book of Llandaff is that in 156AD, King Lucius sent two ambassadors, Elfan and Medwy, to Pope Eleutherius asking that he be made a Christian and that his subjects might also become Christians. Both ambassadors were baptised and ordained, with Elfan being made a bishop. Both men returned to Britain where they taught and converted many in the court of King Lucius. Elfan is said to have become the first Bishop of Llandaff.)

==== Saint Dubricius ====
The diocese was reputedly founded in 560 or earlier by Saint Teilo, during the monastic movement initiated by Saint Dubricius who presided over several monasteries in Ergyng, including Hentland and Moccas. Dubricius is said to have made Teilo abbot of this daughter monastery at Llandaff, which after Dubricius' death became a monastic cathedral and the chief monastery in South Wales. Saint Dubricius is usually given as the first bishop.

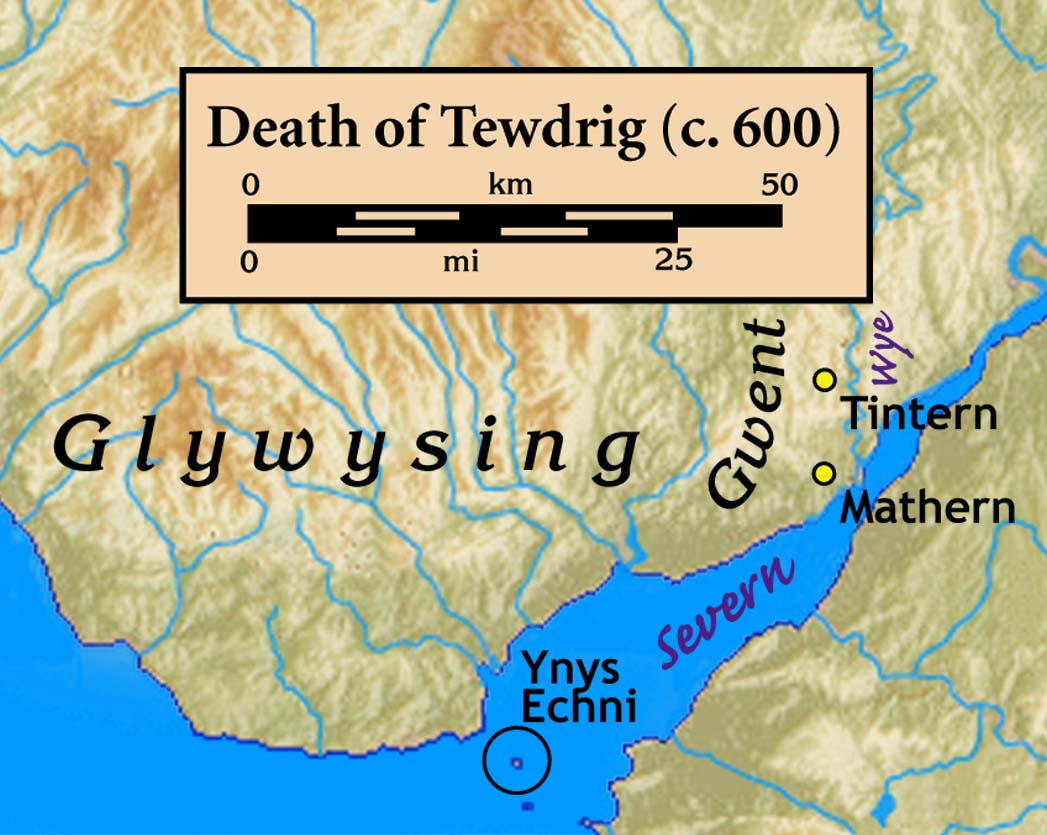
Places mentioned in the 'Book of Llandaff'

The early history of diocese is, however, highly controversial, because the chief authority, the diocesan charters in the Book of Llandaff, though dating from the late 6th century, were considerably doctored to raise Llandaff's profile when they were copied in the early 12th century. Similarly, the saints' 'lives' therein have little basis in fact. Gilbert Hunter Doble and others have clearly demonstrated that there is no evidence that Saints Dubricius and Teilo had anything to do with Llandaff. Dubricius was only active in Ergyng and Gwent, while Teilo's associations with Llandaff have been transferred from his great abbey at Llandeilo Fawr.

=== Early times ===
The original church at Llandaff (perhaps a monastery) may well have been an early foundation. However, it is likely to have been founded by Saint Oudoceus rather than Saint Teilo. The early episcopal authority in the area was, indeed, in Ergyng and Gwent, originally under Dubricius and then his disciples. Their base may have been at Welsh Bicknor, Kenderchurch or Glasbury. Teilo's foundation at Llandeilo may have superseded Ergyng in the mid-7th century or, as David Nash Ford suggests, the two may have remained the seats of independent, yet parallel, bishoprics, as late as the mid-9th century. Both had accepted the ways of the Roman Catholic Church in 777.

There certainly seems to have only been a single diocese by the late 9th century, based at Llandeilo. The Bishops were known as 'Bishop of Teilo'. When exactly the bishop's cathedra (and the Teilo traditions) moved to Llandaff, however, is not clear. Ford, again, suggests a date not much later, after the death of Bishop Nobis in 874. However, a date in the early 11th century or even later cannot be ruled out. The bishops of Llandaff long maintained absolute independence within their own territories, and the rights and privileges of the Church of Llandaff were extensive. However, there is a tradition that by 872, the bishops had already, nominally at least, accepted the authority of the English Province of Canterbury. Certainly this was the case by 982. The first Saxon bishop, Wulfrith, had been installed in 930, though he may have been of dual-nationality.

=== Norman times onwards ===
After the Norman Conquest of south-east Wales in the 1090s, the archbishops of Canterbury began to exercise their jurisdiction over Wales, and Saint Anselm placed Bishop Herewald of Llandaff under interdict. Herewald's successor, Urban, was consecrated at Canterbury, after taking an oath of canonical obedience to the archbishop, and from that time Llandaff became a full dependent of Canterbury. Standing difficulties were the admixture of race and language due to the English settlements and the ignorance and incontinence of the Welsh clergy, who had ceased to observe celibacy and gave scandal to the Normans and English alike. A reform was gradually effected, chiefly by the establishment of new monasteries and mendicant houses. The Book of Llandaff, now at the National Library of Wales, Aberystwyth, reflects Urban's territorial ambitions for his diocese. The present cathedral dates substantially from his time, 1120 and later.

== Anglican Reformation ==
In the religious turmoil of the 16th century, the Bishop of Llandaff, Anthony Kitchin, was the only bishop in office at the accession of Elizabeth I who acquiesced in the religious changes and was accounted an apostate by fellow Catholics. He died in 1563. Rome had already decided to suppress the Catholic see in 1530;

Thereafter, there continued a line of Anglican bishops up to the present day. Some of these showed aptitude for the conditions of the post, e. g. Blethyn and Morgan (the translator of the Bible), also those appointed under Charles II. Another Morgan suffered many years imprisonment for his Laudian convictions. The administration of the diocese suffered from its poor endowment and limited patronage, leading at the end of the 18th century to non-resident bishops (e.g. Watson) and the holding with other ecclesiastical benefices (such as the Deanery of St. Paul's). Failure to speak Welsh characterised the bishops during this period. Bishop Ollivant notably took up the challenge of providing churches for the newly industrialised valleys. The population explosion created pressure for the division of the diocese, which was put into effect with Disestablishment. The diocese remained part of the Province of Canterbury until the creation of the Church in Wales on 31 March 1920.

== List of churches ==
APC = ancient parish church; MC = medieval chapel.

=== Archdeaconry of Llandaff ===
==== Caerphilly and Aber Valley Ministry Area ====
This was formed from the Eglwysilan & Caerphilly Rectorial Benefice. It has an estimated population of 40,722. As of October 2024 it was served by one Ministry Area Leader and one Team Vicar.

Church	Founded (building)	
St Andrew, Penyrheol	1960s	
St Catherine, Caerphilly	c. 1910 (1920s) (2000)	
St Martin, Caerphilly	pre-1870s (1879)	
SS Peter & Cenydd, Senghenydd^{1} (Note: Although closed and apparently destined for redundancy in 2017, the church was in 2021 re-opened as a church plant from Citizen Church, based in Cathays, Cardiff. The church appears now to be administratively part of the Parish of Citizen Church, Cardiff, and no longer part of the Benefice of Eglwysilan (St Ilan) and Caerphilly (now the Caerphilly and Aber Valley Ministry Area).)	1896	
Former churches	Founded (building)	Closed
St Ilan, Eglwysilan	APC	2023

^{1}original dedication to St Peter

==== Gabalfa and Tremorfa Ministry Area ====
This was formed by the union of the parishes of Gabalfa and Tremorfa. It has an estimated population of 19,978. As of October 2024 it was served by one Vicar and one Curate.

Church	Founded (building)
St Mark, Gabalfa	c. 1870 (1968)
St Philip's Community Church, Tremorfa	1930 (1966)

==== Garth Ministry Area ====
This was formed by the union of the parishes of Capel Llanillterne, Michaelston-Super-Ely, Pentyrch, Radyr, St Fagans and Tongwynlais. It is named after. It has an estimated population of 33,024. As of October 2024 it was served by one Ministry Area Leader and two Vicars.

Church	Founded (building)	
Christ Church, Radyr	1903	
St John the Baptist, Danescourt, Radyr	APC	
St Cadoc, Pentyrch	APC (1857)	
St David, Groesfaen	1892	
St Ellteyrn, (Capel) Llanilltern	APC (1862)	
St Mary, St Fagans	APC	
St Mary and St James, Taffs Well^{1}	c. 1897	
St Michael & All Angels, Tongwynlais	1850 (1877)	
Former churches	Founded (building)	Closed
St Michael, Michaelston-super-Ely	APC	2010 (Note: Decree of redundancy and deconsecration dated 16 March 2012.)
St Mary, Nantgarw	1845	1983

^{1}original dedication to St James

==== Llan Ministry Area ====
This was formed by the union of the parishes of Gilfach Goch, Tonyrefail and the Llantrisant Rectorial Benefice. It is named after. It has an estimated population of 67,922. As of October 2024 it was served by three Vicars.

Church	Founded (building)	
SS Illtyd, Gwynno & Dyfodwg, Llantrisant	APC	
SS Julius & Aaron, Llanharan	APC (1857)	
St Anne, Talygarn	MC (1887)	
St David, Miskin	1878 (1907)	
St Illtyd, Llantwit Fardre	APC	
St Illtyd, Llanharry	APC (1868)	
St Michael & All Angels, Beddau	1936	
St Paul, Pontyclun	1895	
St Peter, Brynna	1830s	
St David, Tonyrefail	1903	
St Alban, Tonyrefail	1930 (1981)	
St Barnabas, Gilfach Goch	1899	
Former churches	Founded (building)	Closed
St Andrew, Llantwit Fardre		1980s
Old St Peter's, Peterston-super-Montem	MC	1830s

==== Merthyr Tydfil Ministry Area ====
This was formed by the union of the parishes of Abercanaid, Dowlais, Merthyr Tydfil, Merthyr Vale, Penydarren and Troedyrhiw. It is named after. It has an estimated population of 46,882. As of October 2024 it was served by one Ministry Area Leader and three Vicars.

Church	Founded (building)	
Christ Church, Pant	1870s	
All Saints, Dowlais	C19th (C20th)	
Christ Church, Cyfarthfa/Georgetown	1853 (1857)	
SS Peter & Paul, Abercanaid	1884 (1911)	
St Tydfil, Merthyr Tydfil	APC (1901)	
St David, Merthyr Tydfil	1847	
St John the Baptist, Troedyrhiw	1851	
St Mary & Holy Innocents, Merthyr Vale^{1}	1926 (1974)	
Former churches	Founded (building)	Closed
Church of St Tydfil's Well, The Quar, Merthyr Tydfil	?	
St Luke, Gellideg	?	c. 2019
St John the Baptist, Dowlais	1827	1997
St John, Penydarren	1858	pre-2009
St James the Great, Pentre-bach	late C19th	1979

^{1}originally dedicated to St Mary

==== North Cardiff Ministry Area ====
This was formed by the union of the parishes of Cardiff Roath Park, Lisvane and Llanishen. It is named after. It has an estimated population of 35,470. As of October 2024 it was served by one Ministry Area Leader and two Vicars.

Church	Founded (building)
Christ Church, Roath Park^{1}	1964
St Denys, Lisvane	APC
St Faith, Llanishen	1958
St Isan, Llanishen	APC

^{1}originally known as Christ Church Llanishen

==== Pontypridd Ministry Area ====
This was formed from the benefice of Pontypridd, previously including the parish of Pwllgwaun and Llanddewi Rhondda. It has an estimated population of 39,148. As of October 2024 it was served by one Ministry Area Leader and one Vicar.

Church	Founded (building)	
St John the Evangelist, Graig	pre-1901 (1920s)	
St Luke, Rhydyfelin	1907 (1962)	
St Mary, Glyntaff^{1}	1839	
St Catherine, Pontypridd	1868	
Christ Church, Ynysybwl	1887	
St Gwynno, Llanwonno	APC	
St Luke, Cilfynydd	1892	
Former churches	Founded (building)	Closed
St Matthew, Pontypridd	1885 (Note: Mission Church in Church Road, Trallwn.) (1907)	2006/07
Mission Room, Pen-y-coedcae	before 1900 (Note: The Mission Room appears on an Ordnance Survey Maps dated 1900 and continues to appear at ST 06058 87727 until at least the 1960s.)	1980s?
St Barnabas, Trehafod (Note: Although the village of Trehafod lay partly in the former Rhondda Borough, St Barnabas was within the parish of Llanddewi Rhondda and therefore in the Pontypridd Deanery.)		pre-2012 (Note: Decree of Redundancy and Deconsecration dated 16 March 2012)
St David, Hopkinstown (Llanddewi Rhondda)	1855	2022
St Mark, Pwll Gwaun	1892	2011

^{1}since 2022 administered from Citizen Church in Cardiff rather than as part of the local Ministry Area

==== Roath and Cathays Ministry Area ====
This was formed by the union of the parishes of Cardiff Citizen Church, Cardiff Dewi Sant, Cathays, Roath St Edward, Roath St German, Roath St Margaret, Roath St Martin and Urban Crofters. It is named after. It has an estimated population of 57,697. As of October 2024 it was served by one Ministry Area Leader, five Vicars and one Curate.

Church	Founded (building)
Dewi Sant, Cardiff^{3}	1863
SS Andrew & Teilo, Cathays (Citizen Church)^{1}	1879 (1897)
St Anne, Roath (Urban Crofters)^{2}	1872 (1886)
St Michael & All Angels, Cathays	1922 (1995)
St Edward, Roath	1915 (1919)
St Margaret, Roath	APC (1870)
St German, Roath	1857 (1884)
St Martin, Roath	1886 (1901)

^{1}originally dedicated to St Teilo. Also runs churches in Pontypridd (St Mary's Glyntaff) and Caerphilly (Senghenydd) ^{2}closed 2015 and reopened 2019 as Urban Crofters ^{3}originally dedicated to St Andrew; closed in 1954. Congregation of Eglwys Dewi Sant (founded 1891; see below) moved in, and church reconsecrated as Dewi Sant 1956.

==== St John the Baptist Ministry Area ====
This was formed from the Cardiff City Parish. It is named after. It has an estimated population of 6,847. As of October 2024 it was served by one Priest-in-Charge, one Assistant Curate and one Associate Priest.

Church	Founded (building)	
St John the Baptist, Cardiff	MC	
Former churches	Founded (building)	Closed
St James the Great, Cardiff	pre-1890 (1894)	2006
St Dyfrig, Cardiff	1872 (1893)	1969
All Saints, Adamsdown^{1}	1856 (1893)	1965
(Old) Eglwys Dewi Sant, Cardiff	1891	1954
St Alban, Blackweir	?	

^{1}dedicated to St Elvan until 1903

==== South Cardiff Ministry Area ====
This was formed by the union of the parishes of Cardiff St Dyfrig & St Samson, Cardiff St Mary, Grangetown and Roath St Saviour. It is named after. It has an estimated population of 47,003. As of October 2024 it was served by one Ministry Area Leader.

Church	Founded (building)	
St Mary the Virgin, Cardiff	1843	
St Saviour, Splott	1884 (1888)	
SS Dyfrig & Samson, Grangetown^{1}	1907	
St Paul, Grangetown	1879 (1890)	
Former churches	Founded (building)	Closed
Old St Mary's, Cardiff	APC	1701
St Stephen, Cardiff	pre-1900 (1902)	1992
All Saints, Tyndall Street, Cardiff	1856	1899
St Barnabas, Saltmead	1896	post-1960

^{1}original dedication to St Samson

==== Taff Rhymney Ministry Area ====
This was formed by the union of the parishes of Bargoed, Bedlinog, Brithdir, Deri, Fochriw, Gelligaer, Llanbradach, Llanfabon, Pontlottyn, Treharris, Trelewis and Ystrad Mynach. It is named after the Taff Valley and the Rhymney Valley. It has an estimated population of 52,387. As of October 2024 it was served by one Ministry Area Leader, two Vicars and one Curate.

Church	Founded (building)	
St Gwladys, Bargoed	1877	
St Aidan, Rhymney Bridge	C19th	
St Tyfaelog, Pontlottyn	1863	
SS Mary & Andrew, Fochriw^{1}	1864	
St Cadoc, Gelligaer	APC	
St Margaret, Gilfach	1895 (1933)	
St Mabon, Llanfabon	APC (1847)	
St John the Baptist, Nelson	1887	
St Matthias, Treharris	1896	
Holy Trinity, Ystrad Mynach	1855	
Former churches	Founded (building)	Closed
All Saints, Llanbradach	1896	c. 1994
Llanbradach Chapel	late C19th	C20th
St Mary, Fochriw	1907	1981
St Cadoc, Bedlinog	1873 (1912)	
St Cynon, Treharris	1861	1986
St Mary, Trelewis	1886	pre-2004
St Peter, Deri	c. 1890	
St David, Brithdir		
Trinity Church, Pengam	pre-1877	
St Anne, Cefn Hengoed	1931 (1939)	early 2010s

^{1}original dedication to St Andrew

==== Taff Wenallt Ministry Area ====
This was formed from the Whitchurch Rectorial Benefice. It is named after. It has an estimated population of 34,750. As of October 2024 it was served by one Ministry Area Leader and three Vicars.

Church	Founded (building)
All Saints, Llandaff North	1873 (1955)
All Saints, Rhiwbina	1931
St Mary, Whitchurch	APC (1884)
St Thomas, Whitchurch (Birchgrove)	1911 (1913)

==== The Cathedral Ministry Area ====
This was formed from the Cathedral Parish of Llandaff. It has an estimated population of 6,228. As of October 2024 it was served by one Dean, one Canon Precentor and one Canon Chancellor.

Church	Founded (building)
Cathedral of SS Peter & Paul with SS Dyfrig, Teilo & Euddogwy, Llandaff^{1}	APC

^{1}original dedication to SS Dyfrig & Teilo

==== West Cardiff Ministry Area ====
This was formed by the union of the parishes of Caerau, Ely, Fairwater, Glan Ely and the Canton Rectorial Benefice. It has an estimated population of 64,800. As of October 2024 it was served by one Ministry Area Leader and four Vicars.

Church	Founded (building)	
St David, Cowbridge Road West	1871	
St Peter, Fairwater	1937	
Resurrection, Glan Ely	c. 1910 (1933)	
St Catherine, Canton	1885	
St John the Evangelist, Canton	1855	
St Luke, Canton	1909	
Former churches	Founded (building)	Closed
St Mary the Virgin, Caerau	APC	1973
St Timothy, Caerau	1957	2023

=== Archdeaconry of Margam ===
==== Afon Nedd Ministry Area ====
This was formed by the union of the parishes of Llansawel Briton Ferry, Skewen and the Neath Rectorial Benefice. It is named after. It has an estimated population of 39,559. As of October 2024 it was served by one Ministry Area Leader and one Vicar.

Church	Founded (building)	
St David, Neath	1866	
St Illtyd, Llantwit-juxta-Neath, Neath	APC	
St Thomas the Apostle, Neath^{1}	APC	
St Teilo, Tonmawr^{2}	c. 1920 (2003)	
St Mary, Briton Ferry	APC (1892)	
St John the Baptist, Neath Abbey	1850	
St Mary, Skewen	1905 (2012)	
Former churches	Founded (building)	Closed
SS Peter & Paul, Cimla, Neath	1964 (1970)	2022
St Clement, Briton Ferry	1866	2007
St John the Baptist, Briton Ferry	1878	2013
St Thomas, Pantyrheol, Briton Ferry	1881	
All Saints, Skewen	1905	2006
St Catherine, Melincryddan, Neath	1891	2020
St John, Oakwood	c. 1902	c. 2000

^{1}original dedication to St Thomas a Becket ^{2}known as the Tonmawr Mission until 2003

==== Barry Ministry Area ====
This was formed from the Rectorial Benefice of Barry, including the former parishes of Merthyr Dyfan and Cadoxton-juxta-Barry. It has an estimated population of 54,821. As of October 2024 it was served by one Ministry Area Leader and two Vicars.

Church	Founded (building)	
SS Dyfan & Teilo, Merthyr Dyfan^{1}	APC	
St Cadoc, Cadoxton	APC	
St Mary, Barry Dock	1905	
All Saints, Barry	1908	
Former churches	Founded (building)	Closed
St Nicholas, Barry	APC (1876)	1950s
St Paul the Apostle, Barry	1893	2017
St Baruc, Barry Island	1897	2019

^{1}original dedication to St Teilo

==== Bro Noddfa Newydd Ministry Area ====
This was formed in 2022 by the union of the parishes of Cadoxton-Juxta-Neath, Cilybebyll, Dulais Valley, Dyffryn, Tonna and Vale of Neath. Its name means "A new safe haven" in Welsh. It has an estimated population of 34,303. As of October 2024 it was served by three Vicars.

Church	Founded (building)	
St Cadoc, Cadoxton-juxta-Neath	APC	
St Anne, Tonna	1892	
St John the Evangelist, Cilybebyll	APC	
St John the Baptist, Alltwen	1888	
St David, Dyffryn Cellwen	1925	
St Margaret, Crynant	MC (1910)	
St Cadoc, Aberpergwm	MC (1809)	
St Mary, Blaengwrach	c. 1608	
St David, Resolven	1850	
St Matthew, Dyffryn	1871	
Former churches	Founded (building)	Closed
St Mary, Seven Sisters	pre-1894 (1911)	c. 2022

==== Cowbridge Ministry Area ====
This was formed by the union of the parishes of Colwinston, Llandow, Llysworney and the Cowbridge Rectorial Benefice. It is named after the town of Cowbridge. It has an estimated population of 8,700. As of October 2024 it was served by one Ministry Area Leader and two Vicars.

Church	Founded (building)
St Tydfil, Llysworney	APC (1894)
Holy Trinity, Llandow	APC
St Michael & All Angels, Colwinston	APC
St Canna, Llangan	APC (C19th)
St Mary, St Mary Hill	APC
St Michael, Flemingston	APC (C19th)
Holy Cross, Cowbridge	MC
St John the Baptist, Llanblethian	APC
St Dochdwy, Llandough-juxta-Cowbridge	APC
St Mary, St Mary Church	APC
St Brynach, Llanfrynach	APC
St John the Evangelist, Penllyn	c. 1850
St Senwyr, Llansannor	APC
St Hilary, St Hilary	APC
St Owain, Ystradowen	APC (1868)

==== Cynon Uchaf Ministry Area ====
This was formed by the union of the parishes of Aberdare St Elvan, Aberdare St Fagan, Aberdare St John the Baptist, Aberdare St John the Evangelist and Hirwaun. It is named after the upper Cynon Valley. It has an estimated population of 26,220. As of October 2024 it was served by one Ministry Area Leader and one Vicar.

Church	Founded (building)	
St Fagan, Trecynon	1853 (c. 1858)	
St James, Llwydcoed	1895	
St Luke, Cwmdare	1887	
St Elvan, Aberdare	1852	
St John the Baptist, Aberdare	APC	
St Matthew, Abernant	c. 1880 (1889)	
St Lleurwg, Hirwaun	1858	
St Winifred, Penywaun	1958	
Former churches	Founded (building)	Closed
St David, Aberdare	1853	
St John the Evangelist, Robertstown	1890	

==== Cynon Valley South Ministry Area ====
This was formed by the union of the parishes of Aberaman, Abercynon, Cwmaman, Cwmbach, Matthewstown, Miskin, Mountain Ash, Penrhiwceiber and Ynysboeth. It is named after the Cynon Valley. It has an estimated population of 34,284. As of October 2024 it was served by one Ministry Area Leader and two Vicars.

Church	Founded (building)	
St Margaret, Aberaman	1883	
St Donat, Carnetown	1898	
St Gwynno, Abercynon	1904	
All Saints, Matthewstown/Tyntetown	1903	
St Winifred, Penrhiwceiber	1883	
St Mary Magdalene, Cwmbach	1882	
St Margaret, Mountain Ash	1862	
Former churches	Founded (building)	Closed
St Peter, Abercwmboi	1918	
St David, Mountain Ash	1886	post-1950
St Teilo, Miskin	1890	post-1950
St John the Baptist, Miskin	1909	2007
St Illtyd, Cefn Pennar	1894	
St Joseph, Cwmaman	1890	2021

==== De Morgannwg Ministry Area ====
This was formed by the union of the parishes of Michaelston-Le-Pit, Penmark, Porthkerry, Rhoose, St Andrews Major, St Lythans, Sully and Wenvoe. Its name means "South Glamorgan" in Welsh. It has an estimated population of 20,975. As of October 2024 it was served by one Vicar.

Church	Founded (building)
St Peter, Rhoose	1912 (1993)
St Curig, Porthkerry	APC
St Mary, Penmark	APC
St Michael & All Angels, Michaelston-le-Pit	APC
St Andrew, St Andrew's Major	APC
St Peter, Dinas Powys	1881 (1930)
St John the Baptist, Sully	APC
St Bleddian, St Lythans	APC
St Mary, Wenvoe	APC

==== East Vale Ministry Area ====
This was formed from the East Vale Rectorial Benefice. It has an estimated population of 4,213. As of October 2024 it was served by one Ministry Area Leader and one Vicar.

Church	Founded (building)	
St Cadoc, Pendoylan	APC	
St Donat, Welsh St Donats	APC	
St Bridget, St Bride's-super-Ely	APC	
St Peter, Peterston-super-Ely	APC	
St Mary the Virgin, Bonvilston	APC	
St Nicholas, St Nicholas	APC	
St Cadoc, Llancarfan	APC	
St Illtyd, Llantrithyd	APC	
Former churches	Founded (building)	Closed
St George, St George-super-Ely	APC	c. 2019
Llancadle Chapel of Ease	MC	C18th/19th

==== Heritage Coast Ministry Area ====
This was formed from the Glamorgan Heritage Coast Rectorial Benefice. It is named after the Glamorgan Heritage Coast. It has an estimated population of 19,949. As of October 2024 it was served by one Ministry Area Leader and two Vicars.

Church	Founded (building)	
St James, Wick	APC	
St Tathan, St Athan	APC	
St Donat, St Donats	APC	
St Illtyd, Llantwit Major	APC	
St Mary, Monknash	APC	
Holy Trinity, Marcross	APC	
St Cadoc, Llanmaes	APC	
St Michael, Llanmihangel	APC	
St Giles, Gileston	APC	
St Michael, Ewenny	APC	
St Bridget, St Brides Major	APC	
All Saints, Southerndown	1876 (1968)	
Former churches	Founded (building)	Closed
St Brewis, Eglwysbrewis	APC	early C21st
St Andrew, St Andrews Minor	APC	C17th/18th

==== Llynfi and Upper Afan Valleys Ministry Area ====
This was formed by the union of the parishes of Caerau, Glyncorrwg, Llangynwyd, Maesteg and Troedrhiwgarth. It is named after the Afon Llynfi and Afan Valleys. It has an estimated population of 26,664. As of October 2024 it was served by one Vicar.

Church	Founded (building)	
St Cynfelin, Caerau	1910	
St John the Baptist, Glyncorrwg	APC (1907)	
St Cynwyd, Llangynwyd	APC	
St Michael & All Angels, Maesteg	1898	
Former churches	Founded (building)	Closed
St Mary the Virgin, Troedrhiwgarth, Maesteg	1891	2023
St David, Maesteg	1853	2023
St Tydfil, Bryn	c. 1890 (1902)	2018
St Gabriel, Abergwynfi	1894	post-1985
St Peter, Nantyffyllon, Caerau		pre-2012
St John the Evangelist, Cymmer	pre-1927	c. 2010

==== Margam Ministry Area ====
This was formed by the union of the parishes of Kenfig, Kenfig Hill, Margam, Newton Nottage, Porthcawl and Pyle. It is named after Margam Abbey (the town of Margam, confusingly, is in the Port Talbot Ministry Area). It has an estimated population of 34,858. As of October 2024 it was served by two Vicars.

Church	Founded (building)	
St Mary, Margam Abbey	APC	
St John the Baptist, Newton, Porthcawl	APC	
St David, Nottage	1948 (1992)	
All Saints, Porthcawl	1866 (1914)	
St Mary, Trecco Bay	1953 (1964)	
St James, Pyle^{1}	APC (C15th)	
St Mary Magdalene, Maudlam, Kenfig	APC	
St Theodore, Kenfig Hill	1891	
Former churches	Founded (building)	Closed
Old St David's, Nottage	APC	C17th or earlier
St Colman, Cefn Cribwr	1924	2012

^{1}this church was located in Kenfig and was moved (literally) to Pyle in the 15th century due to encroaching sands

==== Pedair Afon Ministry Area ====
This was formed by the union of the parishes of Aberkenfig, Bettws, Llandyfodwg & Cwm Ogwr, Llangeinor & the Garw Valley, Llanilid, Llansantffraid Aberkenfig and Pencoed. Its name means "Four Rivers" in Welsh. It has an estimated population of 38,245. As of October 2024 it was served by one Ministry Area Leader and four Vicars.

Church	Founded (building)	
SS Ilid & Curig, Llanilid	APC	
St David, Pencoed	c. 1877 (1915)	
St Paul, Heol-y-Cyw	1889	
St Bridget, St Bride's Minor, Aberkenfig	APC	
St John the Divine, Tondu, Aberkenfig	1868	
St David, Bettws	APC	
St David, Pontycymmer	1911	
St Ceinwyr, Llangeinor	APC	
St Tyfodwg, Llandyfodwg	APC (1870s)	
St David, Ogmore Vale	1879	
Former churches	Founded (building)	Closed
St James, Blaengarw	1890	2004
St Mary, Pont-y-rhyl, Pontycymer	1892	1986
St Theodore, Pontycymer	pre-1895	
St Theodore, Bryncethin	1896	1992
St Thomas the Apostle, Coytrahen, Tondu	pre-1899 (1934)	post-1970s
St John the Baptist, Ogmore Vale	1900 (1914)	2004
St Peter, Nant-y-moel	1889	1960
St Paul, Nant-y-moel	1909	1992

==== Penarth Ministry Area ====
This was formed by the union of the parishes of Llandough-juxta-Penarth and Penarth. It is named after Penarth. It has an estimated population of 26,385. As of October 2024 it was served by one Ministry Area Leader, one Vicar and one Curate.

Church	Founded (building)	
All Saints, Penarth	1891 (1954)	
St Peter, (Old) Cogan	APC	
Holy Nativity, Penarth	1894 (1952)	
St Augustine, Penarth	APC (1866)	
St Dochdwy, Llandough	APC (1866)	
Former churches	Founded (building)	Closed
St Luke, Penarth	1960	2006
St Lawrence, Lavernock^{1}	APC	2002
St James, Leckwith	APC (1866)	C20th

^{1}occasional services still held

==== Pen-y-bont ar Ogwr Ministry Area ====
This was formed by the union of the parishes of Coity, Coychurch, Laleston, Merthyr Mawr, Newcastle, Nolton and Penyfai. It is named after Bridgend (Pen-y-bont ar Ogwr in Welsh). It has an estimated population of 54,564. As of October 2024 it was served by one Ministry Area Leader and one Vicar.

Church	Founded (building)	
St Mary, Coity	APC	
St Mary, Nolton	MC (1887)	
St Mary, Brackla (meets in school)	1995	
St Crallo, Coychurch	APC	
All Saints, Penyfai	1903	
St Teilo, Merthyr Mawr	APC (1852)	
St David, Laleston	APC	
St Illtyd, Newcastle	APC	
Former churches	Founded (building)	Closed
St Tudwg, Tythegston	APC (1876)	late C20th

==== Port Talbot Ministry Area ====
This was formed by the union of the parishes of Aberavon St Mary, Aberavon St Agnes, Baglan, Cwmafan, Margam St David, Port Talbot St Paul, Port Talbot St Theodore and Sandfields. It is named after the town of Port Talbot. It has an estimated population of 44,811. As of October 2024 it was served by one Ministry Area Leader and two Vicars.

Church	Founded (building)	
St Catharine, Baglan	1875	
St Michael, Cwmavon	APC (C17th)	
Holy Trinity, Sandfields	1953 (2008)	
St Agnes, Aberavon/Port Talbot	1902 (1910)	
St Theodore, Port Talbot	1897	
Former churches	Founded (building)	Closed
Old St Baglan's, Baglan	APC	1954
New St Baglan's, Baglan	1959	2024
All Saints, Cwmafan	1855	1980
St Peter, Goytre	1915	2019
St John, Pontrhydyfen		pre-2012
Holy Cross, Port Talbot	1827	2008
St Paul, Port Talbot	1910	2016
St David, Margam	1959	2024
St Mary, Aberavon	APC (1859)	2024

==== Rhondda Ministry Area ====
This was formed by the union of the parishes of Clydach Vale, Dinas, Pen Rhondda Fawr, Penygraig, Pont Rhondda, Porth Newydd, Rhondda Fach Uchaf, Tonypandy, Williamstown and Ystradyfodwg. It is named after the Rhondda area. It has an estimated population of 70,235. As of October 2024 it was served by three Vicars.

Church	Founded (building)	
St Barnabas, Penygraig	1897 (1915)	
St John the Evangelist, Cymmer, Porth	1889	
St Thomas, Clydach Vale	1896	
St Andrew, Tonypandy	1877	
St Illtud, Williamstown	1884 (1891)	
St George, Cwmparc	1896	
St Matthew, Treorchy	1871	
All Saints, Trealaw		
St Cynon, Llwynypia		
St Stephen, Ystrad Rhondda	1896	
St Dunstan, Ferndale	1906	
Holy Trinity, Tylorstown	1883	
Llanfair Uniting Church, Penrhys^{1}	1992	
St Peter, Pentre	1889	
St John the Baptist, Ton Pentre, Ystradfodwg	APC (1893) (1987)	
Former churches	Founded (building)	Closed
Dinas Mission, Dinas	1897	2018
St Anne, Ynyshir	1886	c. 2018
St Dyfan, Clydach		1965
Christ Church, Ferndale	1876 (1886)	
St Luke, Maerdy	pre-1923	
All Saints, Maerdy	1885	2011
St David, Ton Pentre	1881	1980s
St Mark, Gelli	1896 (c. 1910)	1987
St Paul, Porth	1890	2014
St Luke, Llwyncelyn	1921	pre-2017
St David, Tonypandy		
St George, Tonyrefail		
St Alban, Treherbert (Tynewydd)	1891	
St Mary, Treherbert	1866	1970s
All Saints, Treherbert	1894	
St Tyfodwg, Treorchy	1895	
St David, Tylorstown	1906	late C20th
St Mary Magdalene, Pontygwaith	1896	1997
St Thomas, Wattstown	1896	

^{1}a joint church of the Baptist Union of Great Britain, the Baptist Union of Wales, the Church in Wales, the Congregational Federation, the Methodist Church, the Presbyterian Church of Wales, the Union of Welsh Independents, and the United Reformed Church

== Dedications ==
=== Medieval churches (chapelries in italics) ===
- Holy Cross: Cowbridge
- (Holy) Trinity: Llandow, Marcross
- St Andrew: St Andrew's Major, St Andrew's Minor
- St Anne: Talygarn
- St Augustine of Hippo: Penarth
- St Baglan: Baglan
- St Bleddian: St Lythans
- St Brewis: Eglwysbrewis
- St Bridget: St Bride's Major, St Bride's Minor, St Bride's-super-Ely
- St Brynach: Llanfrynach
- St Cadoc: Aberpergwm, Cadoxton-juxta-Barry, Cadoxton-juxta-Neath, Gelligaer, Llancarfan, Llanmaes, Pendoylan, Pentyrch
- St Canna: Llangan
- St Ceinwyr: Llangeinor
- St Crallo: Coychurch
- St Curig: Porthkerry
- St Cynwyd: Llangynwyd
- St David: Bettws, Laleston, Nottage
- St Denys: Lisvane
- St Dochdwy: Llandough-juxta-Cowbridge, Llandough-juxta-Penarth
- St Dunwyd: St Donats, Welsh St Donats
- SS Dyfrig & Teilo: Llandaff
- St Ellteyrn: Llanilltern
- St George: St George-super-Ely
- St Giles: Gileston
- St Gwynno: Llanwonno
- St Ilan: Eglwysilan
- St Ilar: St Hilary
- SS Ilid & Curig: Llanilid
- St Illtud: Llanharry, Llantrithyd, Llantwitfardre, Llantwit-juxta-Neath, Llantwit Major, Newcastle
- SS Illtud, Gwynno & Dyfodwg: Llantrisant
- St Isan: Llanishen
- St James: Kenfig, Leckwith, Wick
- St John the Baptist: Aberdare, Cardiff, Glyncorrwg, Llanblethian, Newton, Radyr, Sully, Ystradyfodwg
- St John the Evangelist: Cilybebyll
- SS Julius & Aaron: Llanharan
- St Lawrence: Lavernock
- St Mabon: Llanfabon
- St Margaret: Crynant, Roath
- St Mary: Aberavon, Bonvilston, Briton Ferry, Caerau, Cardiff, Coity, Margam Abbey, Monknash, Nolton, Penmark, St Fagans, St Mary Church, St Mary Hill, Wenvoe, Whitchurch
- St Mary Magdalene: Maudlam
- St Michael: Colwinston, Cwmavon, Ewenny, Flemingston, Llanmihangel, Michaelston-le-Pit, Michaelston-super-Ely
- St Nicholas: Barry, St Nicholas
- St Owain: Ystradowen
- St Peter: Cogan, Peterston-super-Ely, Peterston-super-Montem
- St Senwyr: Llansannor
- St Tathan: St Athan
- St Teilo: Merthyr Dyfan, Merthyr Mawr
- St Thomas Becket: Neath
- St Tudwg: Tythegston
- St Tydfil: Llysworney, Merthyr Tydfil
- St Tyfodwg: Llandyfodwg
- No dedication/dedication unknown: Llancadle

=== Post-medieval churches ===
- All Saints: Barry (1908), Cardiff (1856), Cwmavon (1855), Llanbradach (1896), Llandaff North (1873), Maerdy (1885), Matthewstown (1903), Merthyr Tydfil (C19th), Penarth (1891), Penyfai (1903), Porthcawl (1866), Rhiwbina (1931), Skewen (1905), Southerndown (1876), Trealaw (?), Treherbert (1894)
- Christ Church: Ferndale (1876), Merthyr Tydfil (1853), Pant (1870s), Radyr (1903), Roath Park (1964), Ynysybwl (1887)
- Holy Cross: Port Talbot (1827)
- Holy Nativity: Penarth (1894)
- (Holy) Trinity: Pengam (C19th), Sandfields (1953), Tylorstown (1883), Ystradmynach (1855)
- Resurrection: Glan Ely (1910)
- St Agnes: Aberavon (1902)
- St Aidan: Rhymney Bridge (C19th)
- St Alban: Blackweir (?), Tonyrefail (1930), Treherbert (1891)
- St Andrew: Caerphilly (1960s), Cardiff (1863), Fochriw (1864), Llantwitfardre (?), Tonypandy (1877)
- St Anne: Cefnhengoed (1931), Roath (1872), Tonna (1892), Ynyshir (1886)
- St Baglan: Baglan (1959)
- St Barnabas: Gilfachgoch (1899), Penygraig (1897), Saltmead (1896), Trehafod (?)
- St Baruc: Barry Island (1897)
- St Cadoc: Bedlinog (1873)
- St Catherine: Baglan (1875), Caerphilly (1910), Canton (1885), Neath (1891), Pontypridd (1868)
- St Clement: Briton Ferry (1866)
- St Colman: Cefn Cribwr (1924)
- St Cynfelin: Caerau (1910)
- St Cynon: Llwynypia (?), Treharris (1861)
- St David: Aberdare (1853), Brithdir (?), Cardiff (1891), Cowbridge Road West (1871), Dyffryncellwen (1925), Groesfaen (1892), Hopkinstown (1855), Maesteg (1853), Margam (1959), Merthyr Tydfil (1847), Miskin (1878), Mountain Ash (1886), Neath (1866), Nottage (1948), Ogmore Vale (1879), Pencoed (1877), Pontycymmer (1911), Resolven (1850), Tonpentre (1881), Tonypandy (?), Tonyrefail (1903), Tylorstown (1906)
- St Dunstan: Ferndale (1906)
- St Dunwyd: Carnetown (1898)
- St Dyfan: Clydach (?)
- St Dyfrig: Cardiff (1872)
- St Edward: Roath (1915)
- St Elwen: Aberdare (1852), Adamsdown (1856)
- St Fagan: Trecynon (1853)
- St Faith: Llanishen (1958)
- St Gabriel: Abergwynfi (1894)
- St George: Cwmparc (1896), Tonyrefail (?)
- St German: Roath (1857)
- St Gwladys: Bargoed (1877)
- St Gwynno: Abercynon (1904)
- St Illtyd: Cefn Pennar (1894), Williamstown (1884)
- St James: Blaengarw (1890), Cardiff (C19th), Llwydcoed (1895), Pentrebach (C19th), Taffs Well (1897)
- St John the Baptist: Alltwen (1888), Briton Ferry (1878), Dowlais (1827), Miskin (1909), Neath (1850), Nelson (1887), Ogmore Vale (1900), Troedyrhiw (1851)
- St John the Evangelist: Canton (1855), Cymmer (?), Graig (C19th), Oakwood (1902), Penllyn (1850), Penydarren (1858), Pontrhydyfen (?), Porth (1889), Robertstown (1890), Tondu (1868)
- St Joseph: Cwmaman (1890)
- St Lleurwg: Hirwaun (1858)
- St Luke: Canton (1909), Cilfynydd (1892), Cwmdare (1887), Gellideg (?), Llwynycelyn (1921), Maerdy (?), Penarth (1960), Rhydyfelin (1907)
- St Margaret: Aberaman (1883), Gilfach (1895), Mountain Ash (1862)
- St Mark: Cardiff (1870), Gelli (1896), Pwllgwaun (1892)
- St Martin: Caerphilly (C19th), Roath (1886)
- St Mary: Barry (1905), Blaengwrach (1608), Brackla (1995), Cardiff (1843), Fochriw (1907), Glyntaff (1839), Merthyr Vale (1926), Nantgarw (1845), Penrhys (1992), Pontyrhyl (1892), Seven Sisters (C19th), Skewen (1905), Trecco Bay (1953), Treherbert (1866), Trelewis (1886), Troedrhiwgarth (1891)
- St Mary Magdalene: Cwmbach (1882), Pontygwaith (1896)
- St Matthew: Abernant (1880), Dyffryn (1871), Pontypridd (1885), Treorchy (1871)
- St Matthias: Treharris (1896)
- St Michael: Beddau (1936), Cathays (1922), Maesteg (1898), Tongwynlais (1850)
- St Paul: Barry (1893), Grangetown (1879), Heolycyw (1889), Nantymoel (1909), Pontyclun (1895), Port Talbot (1910), Porth (1890)
- St Peter: Abercwmboi (1918), Brynna (1830s), Deri (1890), Dinaspowys (1881), Fairwater (1937), Goytre (1915), Nantyffyllon (?), Nantymoel (1889), Pentre (1889), Rhoose (1912), Senghenydd (1896)
- SS Peter & Paul: Abercanaid (1884), Neath (1964)
- St Philip: Cardiff (1930)
- St Samson: Grangetown (1907)
- St Saviour: Splott (1884)
- St Stephen: Cardiff (C19th), Ystradrhondda (1896)
- St Teilo: Cathays (1879), Miskin (1890), Tonmawr (2003)
- St Theodore of Tarsus: Bryncethin (1896), Kenfig Hill (1891), Pontycymer (1895), Port Talbot (1897)
- St Thomas: Briton Ferry (1881), Clydach Vale (1896), Coytrahen (C19th), Wattstown (1896), Whitchurch (1911)
- St Timothy: Caerau (1957)
- St Tydfil: Bryn (1890)
- St Tydfil's Well: Merthyr Tydfil (?)
- St Tyfaelog: Pontlottyn (1863)
- St Tyfodwg: Treorchy (1895)
- St Winifred: Penrhiwceiber (1883), Penywaun (1958)
- No dedication/dedication unknown: Dinas (1897), Llanbradach (C19th), Penycoedcae (C19th)

=== See also ===
- List of Catholic dioceses in England and Wales

== Sources ==
- Clifton, A. B.; Willmott, Edmund Charles Morgan (1907). The cathedral church of Llandaff: a description of the building and a short history of the see, Volume 20. George Bell & Sons.
