= St Mary's Church, Aberavon =

St Mary's Church
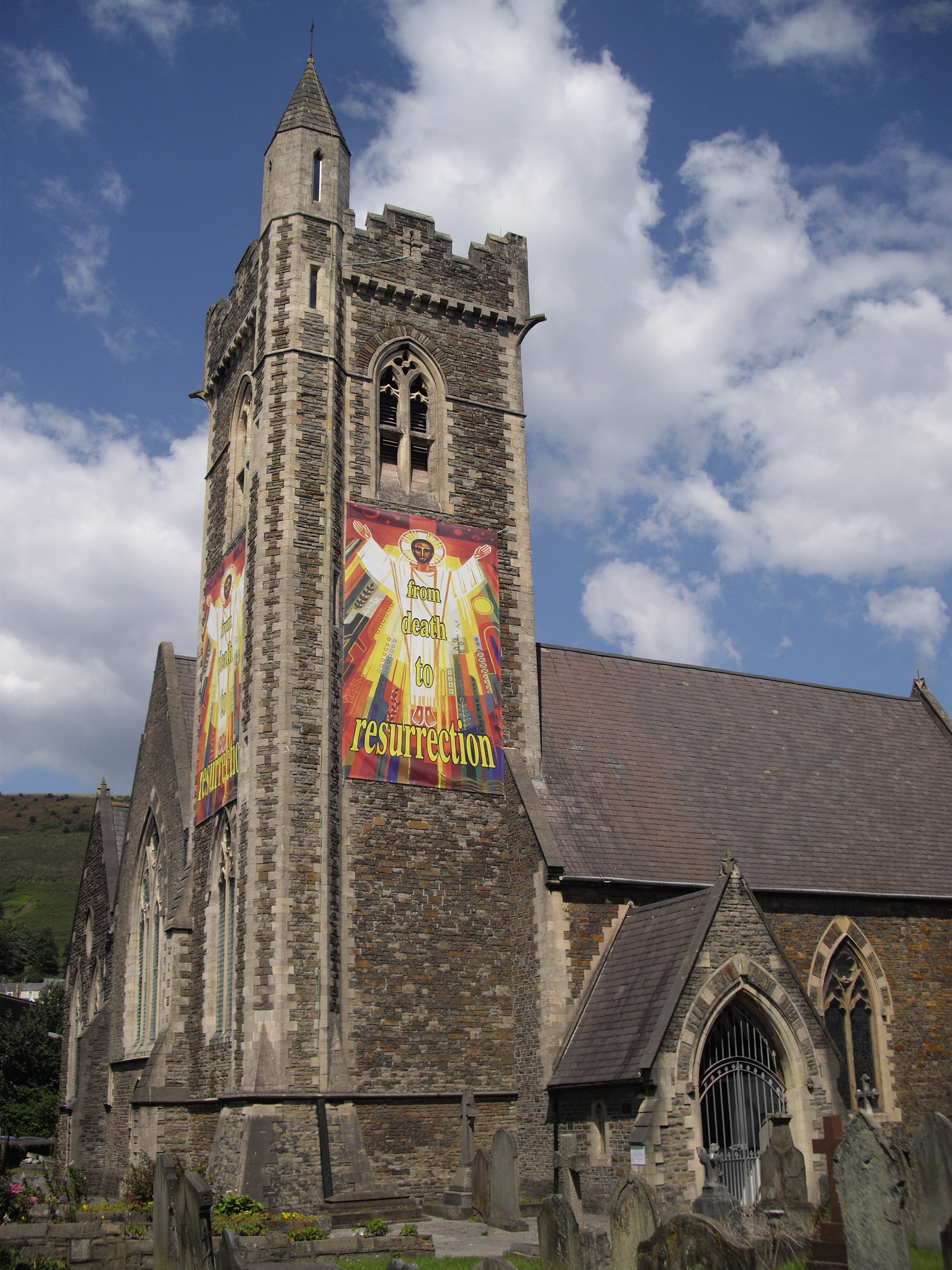
- St Mary's Church
- 51.5964°N 3.7873°W
- Denomination: Church in Wales
- Website: www.parishofaberavon.org/st-marys.html

History
- Dedication: St Mary

St Mary's Church, Aberavon, is an Anglican church in Port Talbot, South Wales. It is part of the Rectorial Benefice of Aberavon. It has been a Grade II listed building since 31 January 2000., It had its last service on 21 April 2024 and it is intended to deconsecrate and repurpose the building.

The first mention of a church on this site was in 1199. The medieval church was rebuilt in the Gothic style in 1858–59 by the architects John Prichard and John Pollard Seddon. The tower was added to around 1870, and the north aisle was added in 1898 by an architect named G. E. Halliday.

The alabaster and green marble reredos was designed in 1890 by another well-known partnership of ecclesiastical architects, Frederick R. Kempson and Charles Busteed Fowler, who carried out work in other South Wales churches such as St Catherine's Church, Canton, Cardiff, and St Donat's Church, Welsh St Donats. In 1927, a medieval piscina was placed in the chancel; it did not come from the original church but probably from a chapel elsewhere in the district.

The most notable grave in the churchyard is that of Dic Penderyn, executed in 1831 for his role in the Merthyr Rising. A memorial was placed by local trade unionists in 1966.
