= Christ Church, Radyr =

Church in Cardiff, Wales

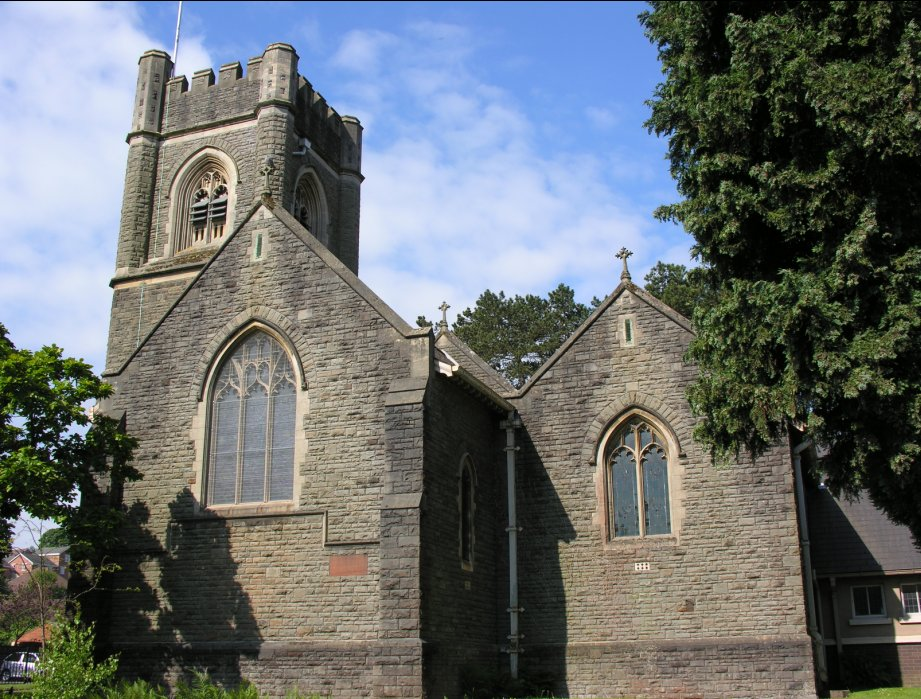
- The church in 2008
- Christ Church, Radyr
- 51.5138°N 3.2513°W
- Denomination: Church in Wales
- Website: https://garthma.wales/our-churches-and-halls/christ-church-radyr/

History
- Status: Active

Architecture
- Functional status: Daughter church
- Heritage designation: II
- Designated: 28 October 1975
- Architect: G.E. Halliday
- Style: Perpendicular
- Groundbreaking: 1903
- Completed: May 1904

Specifications
- Materials: Pennant sandstone, Bath stone

Administration
- Diocese: Diocese of Llandaff
- Archdeaconry: Llandaff
- Deanery: Radyr
- Parish: Radyr

Clergy
- Priest: Rev'd Mary Evans

Christ Church is a Grade II listed Anglican church in Radyr, Cardiff, Wales. It is a daughter church of St John the Baptist Church, Danescourt, despite being considerably larger.

The church was begun in 1903, designed by G.E. Halliday, the Diocesan Surveyor for Llandaff. It was built in response to the growth in the populations of Radyr and Morganstown in the late Victorian years. The nave was first used on Easter Sunday 1904. The dedication stone was laid by Robert Windsor-Clive, 1st Earl of Plymouth, who held the title of Viscount Windsor at nearby St Fagans and had donated the land upon which the church was built. He had formerly served as Cardiff's mayor in the 1890s. The chancel, vestry and tower were added in 1910. An extension, housing parish function rooms, was added in the late 20th century. The original vestry is now a chapel.
