= St Dochdwy's Church, Llandough =

St Dochdwy's Church
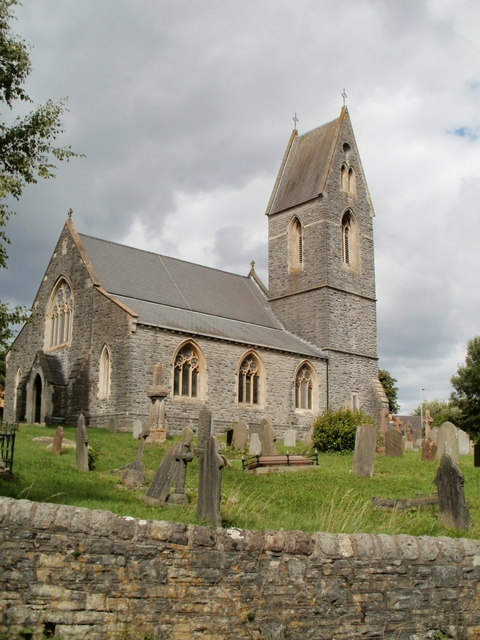
- St Dochdwy's Church
- 51.4523°N 3.1986°W
- Denomination: Anglican

History
- Founded: 12th century
- Consecrated: 12 July 1866

Architecture
- Functional status: Active
- Heritage designation: Grade II
- Designated: 4 June 1989
- Architect: S. C. Fripp
- Style: Gothic Revival
- Completed: 1866
- Construction cost: £2,600

Specifications
- Materials: stone

Administration
- Diocese: Llandaff
- Archdeaconry: Llandaff
- Deanery: Penarth and Barry
- Parish: Penarth and Llandough

St Dochdwy's Church is a historic listed church in the village of Llandough, near Penarth in the Vale of Glamorgan, Wales.

== History ==
Llandough was an important site for Christian worship from the early years of Celtic Christianity. The word 'Llan' refers to an enclosure which often surrounded an early building of worship, and many other Welsh locations drew their names from early churches in this way, such as Llanishen, Llanedeyrn and Llandewi (the original name for Nottage). The saint for whom the church is named is known by numerous other renderings, such as Cyngar, Dochau, Dochow, Dochwy, Dogwyn and Docco, amongst others.

St Dochau established a monastic community known as Bangor Dochau in the 5th century, one of many in Glamorgan (then known as Morganwg). An archaeological excavation took place at the church in 1994, at which a large cemetery was uncovered. Subsequent radiocarbon dating showed that the burials commenced there in the period c. 370AD – c. 640AD. The latest radiocarbon date of c. 782AD – c. 1024AD suggests that the burials continued at Llandough until the monastery became defunct in around the early 11th century.

Despite having lost its monastery, the site continued in use as a parish church, and the first mention of a permanent church building on the site dates from the 12th century. The medieval church lasted (after restoration in the 18th century) until 1820, when it was demolished. The building which replaced it lasted in use only for forty years before it was deemed too small and was replaced by the current structure. The 1820–1860 church was dismantled and re-erected at Leckwith, where it was re-dedicated to St James. The building still stands, though has since been converted into a pair of houses. The present St Dochdwy's Church was designed by S. C. Fripp of Bristol and built by David Jones of Penarth for a cost of £2,600. Fripp was inspired by William Butterfield's work on St Augustine's Church in Penarth, which was completed in the same year.

The present church, which comprises a nave and a chancel with a north vestry, has a saddleback tower that has room for two bells. The gabled porch retains memorials from the 18th century. The chancel stalls date from 1934. The church contains a chapel to the Royal British Legion. The interior was renovated in July 2013. The church incorporated the original Norman chancel arch which now links the south aisle with the belltower. The church became listed in 1989 as "a prominent Gothic Revival church by a regional architect occupying an important Early Christian site". Since 2004 the church is now in the Parish of Penarth and Llandough.

== Irbic Cross ==
In the graveyard of St Dochdwy's is a monument known as the Irbic Cross. St Dochau's grandfather was known as Erbin, and it is thought that the cross is probably a commemoration to him. The cross is around ten feet high and dates from the 10th century. It is built from Sutton stone in four moulded blocks, though the cross head is missing.

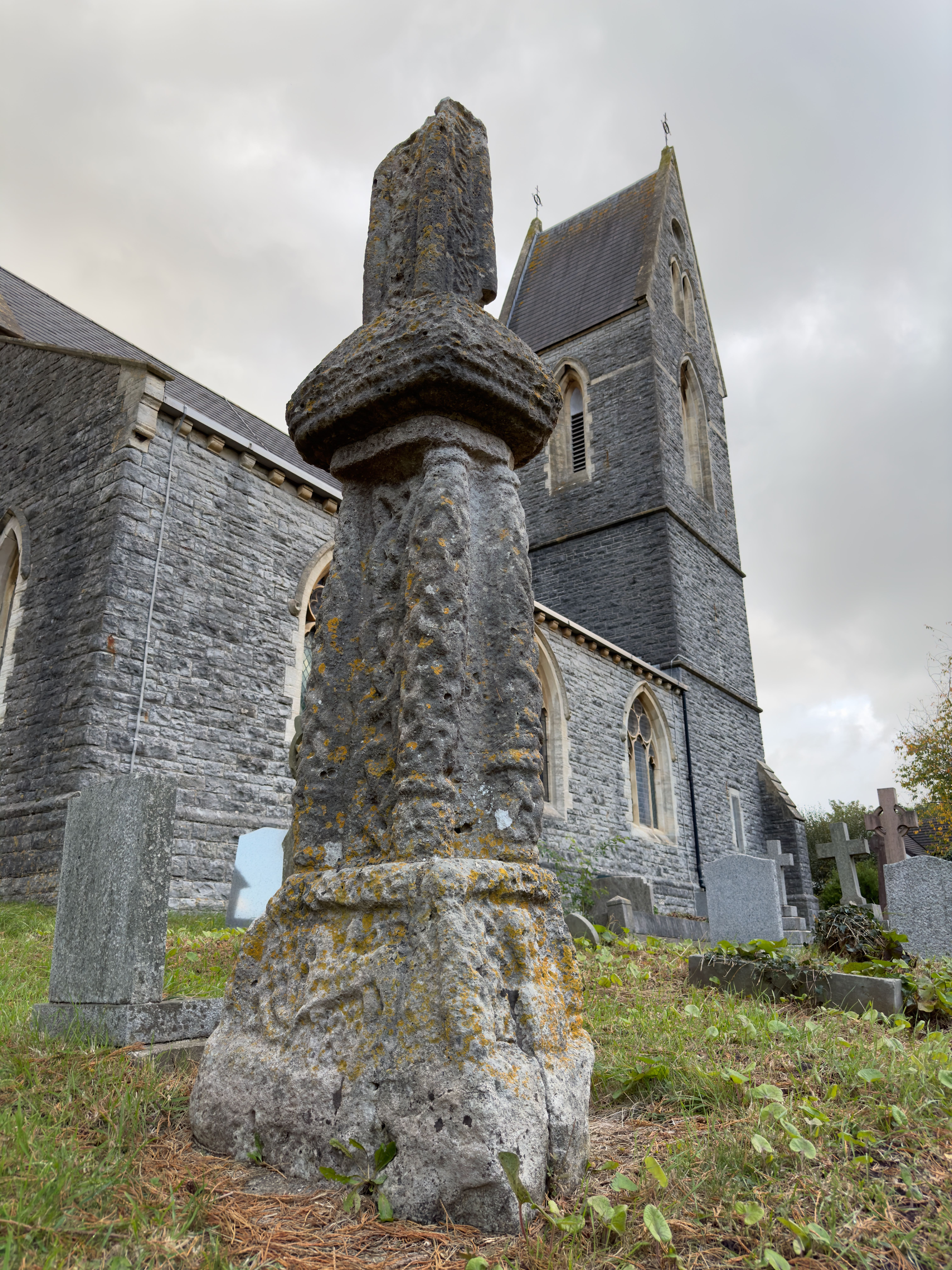

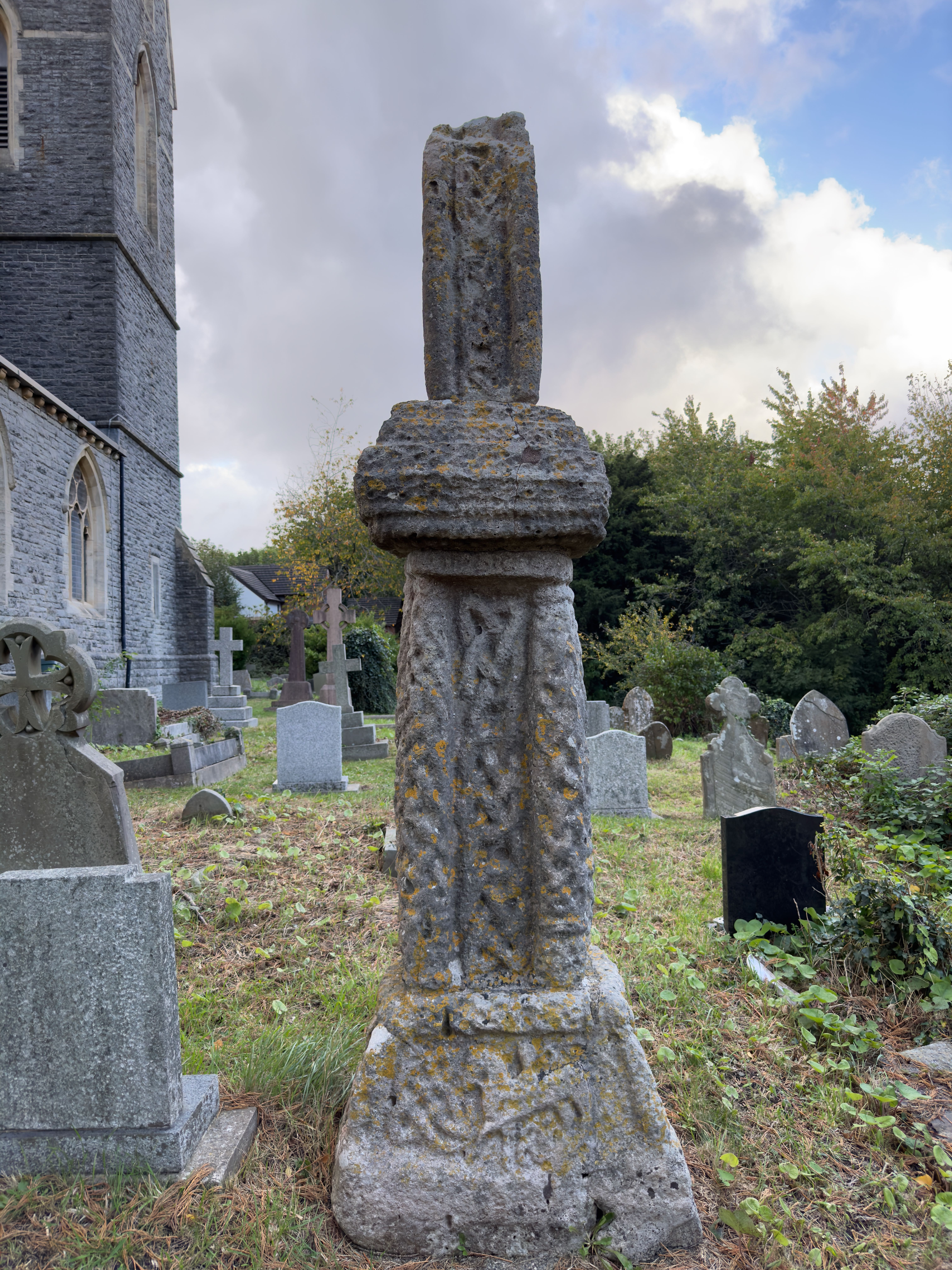
