= Thomas Hancorne =

Thomas Hancorne may refer to:

- Thomas Hancorne (1642 – 1731), Welsh clergyman
- Thomas Hancorne (1752 – 1838), Welsh clergyman
