= Nottage General Baptist & Unitarian Church =

Church in Nottage, Bridgend, Wales

Nottage General Baptist & Unitarian Chapel
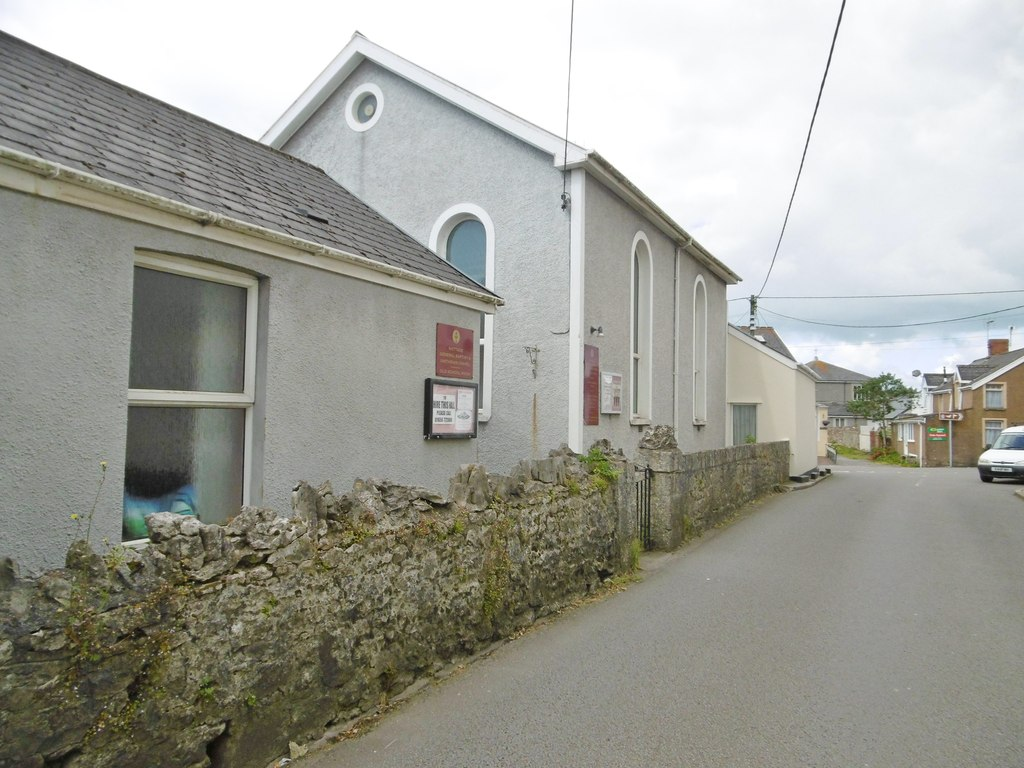
- Nottage General Baptist & Unitarian Chapel
- 51.490253°N 3.702697°W
- Denomination: Baptist, Unitarian

History
- Status: Active (Services Every Sunday at 11am)
- Founded: Before 1789

Specifications
- Capacity: 120
- Length: 33ft
- Width: 27ft

Nottage General Baptist & Unitarian Chapel is a nonconformist chapel in Nottage, Bridgend, Wales. It is shared by General Baptists and Unitarians.

== History ==
The church is the oldest nonconformist place of worship in the area, tracing its roots to the 17th century. Radical religious movements were active in the area in the 18th century, including the General Baptists, who founded the chapel before 1789. The chapel has been shared by the Unitarians (part of the General Assembly of Unitarian and Free Christian Churches) since the early 19th Century.

From 1808, the chapel was administered by the Rev. Evan Lloyd (1764–1847), whose descendants officiated the church for over a century. The most recent minister was Rev. Lewis Rees, who served the congregation from 2015 until 2022.
