= Thomas Hancorne (1752–1838) =

The Reverend Thomas Hancorne DL JP
- Born: 1752
- Died: June 4, 1838 (aged 85–86)
- Education: Jesus College, Oxford
- Years active: 1778–1838

Thomas Mansel Hancorne DL JP (1752 – 1838) was a Welsh Anglican clergyman and judicial officer.

== Early life ==
Hancorne was the son of Samuel Hancorne of Oxwich, Glamorgan by his wife Mary Bevan, and a great-grandson of the Rev. Thomas Hancorne and Thomas Mansel of Penrice Castle. He matriculated at Jesus College, Oxford on 26 March 1773.

== Career ==
Hancorne was ordained as a deacon on 27 June 1778 by Shute Barrington, Bishop of Llandaff, and as a priest on 30 May 1779 by Lord James Beauclerk, Bishop of Hereford.

He began his career at the Parish Church of Pyle and Kenfig, where he was a curate from 28 June 1778.

Hancorne was appointed Rector of Michaelston-le-Pit on 29 June 1781 and Barry on 26 July 1792. He was instituted to the vicarship of Newcastle with Bettws, Laleston and Tythegston, on the presentation of the Lord Chancellor Alexander Wedderburn, on 16 March 1795. He retained all these posts until his death in 1838.

Hancorne was appointed a deputy lieutenant (DL) and justice of the peace (JP) for the county of Glamorgan.
