= St Saviour's Church, Splott =

Church in Cardiff, Wales

St Saviour's Splott
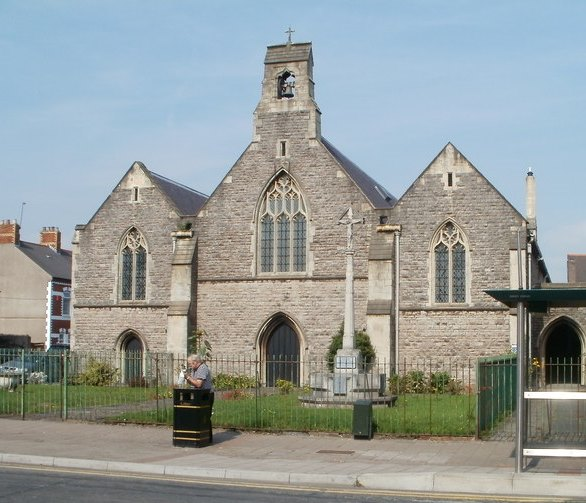
- St Saviour's Splott
- 51.4838°N 3.1514°W
- Country: Wales
- Denomination: Church in Wales
- Website: https://churchofstsaviourcardiff.weebly.com/ https://www.saintgermanwithsaintsaviour.org/

History
- Status: Active
- Founded: 1884
- Dedication: St. Saviour
- Consecrated: 30 October 1888

Architecture
- Functional status: Parish Church
- Heritage designation: Grade II
- Designated: 12 February 1952
- Architect(s): G. F. Bodley and Thomas Garner
- Groundbreaking: 28 January 1892

Specifications
- Materials: Swelton stone, Bath stone

Administration
- Diocese: Diocese of Llandaff
- Archdeaconry: Llandaff
- Deanery: Cardiff
- Parish: Roath St Saviour

St Saviour's Church is a Church in Wales church in Splott, Cardiff, South Wales.

== Early history ==
In the late 19th Century, a large number of churches were built in Cardiff as the city expanded, and what had been villages were absorbed into the growing city. Splott, then called East Moors or Old Moors, had several new churches built. A school chapel, dedicated to St Columba had been founded in 1877. St Saviour's was established as a tin tabernacle in 1884. Both of these buildings were replaced with the present church in 1888. The church was designed by the architects G. F. Bodley and Thomas Garner with a three-gabled design modelled on the 15th century St Mary's Church, Tenby, although without a spire. Originally a daughter church of St German's, St Saviour's saw the creation of its own parish on 30 January 1893. The south aisle was added in 1894. Like many Cardiff churches, St Saviour's has a war memorial.

The church served a prominent role in public life through the 20th Century, particularly for its parish hall. This served as a dance hall during World War II.

The church became Grade II listed in 1952.

== Recent history ==
Many churches in Cardiff closed in the post-war years, though St Saviour's managed to avoid this fate. In 1961, it saw a restoration by George Pace which saw the subdivision of the nave into a hall. Despite this, its Victorian image remains largely unaltered (though some of the stained glass dates only from the 1960s). In 1985, the old church hall on the opposite side of the street was sold off. It was replaced with the present structure (as well as a new vestibule), which was opened on 15 May 1987.

In 2011, the lead was stripped from the roof of the church's porch, but was abandoned nearby.

In 2019, the priest of St. Saviours and the nearby St. German's Church, Fr Phelim O'Hare, was hurt trying to stop thieves from stealing his car.

== Gallery ==
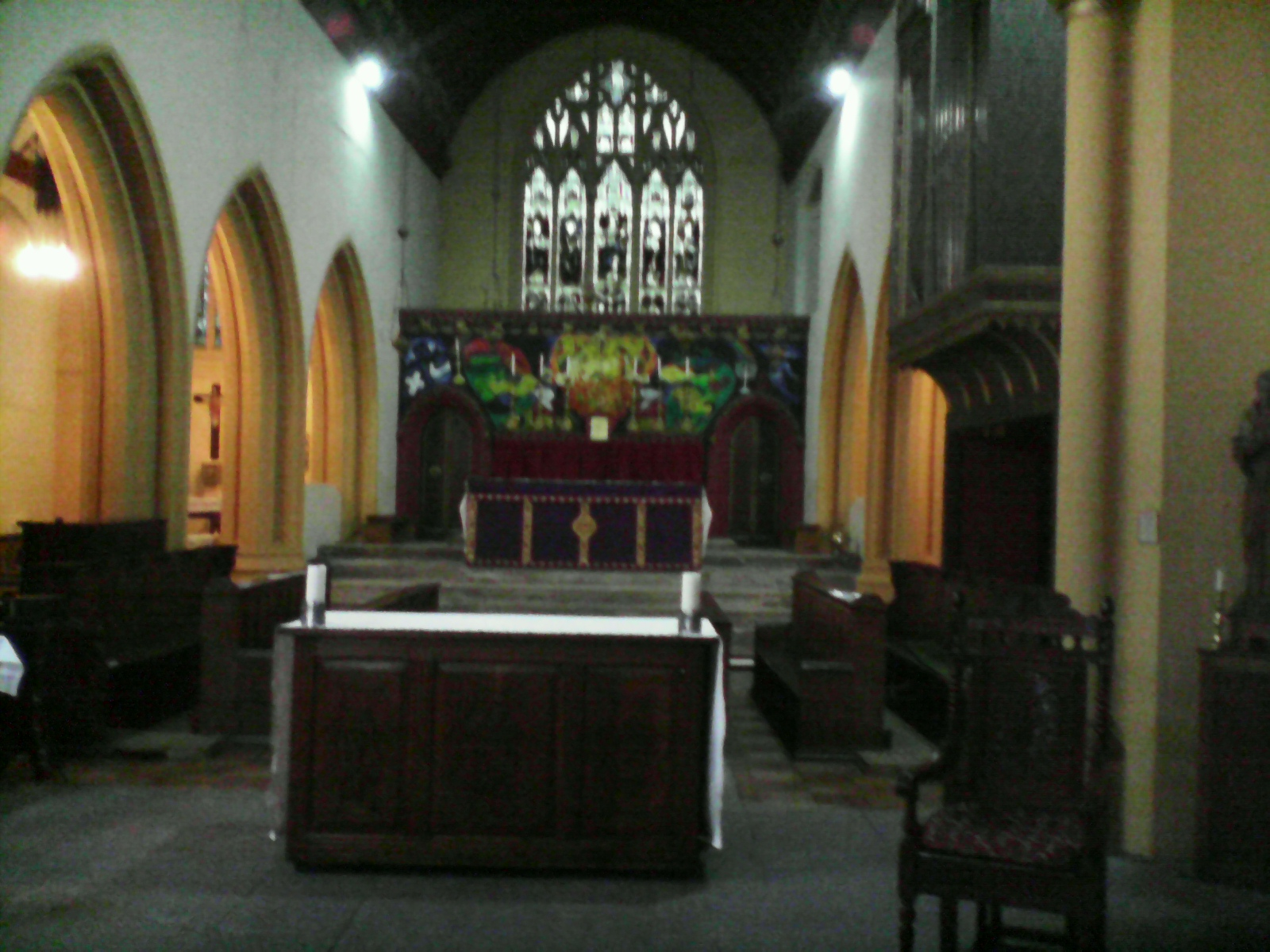
Interior of St Saviour's, facing the chancel
