= St David's Church, Nottage =

St David's, Nottage
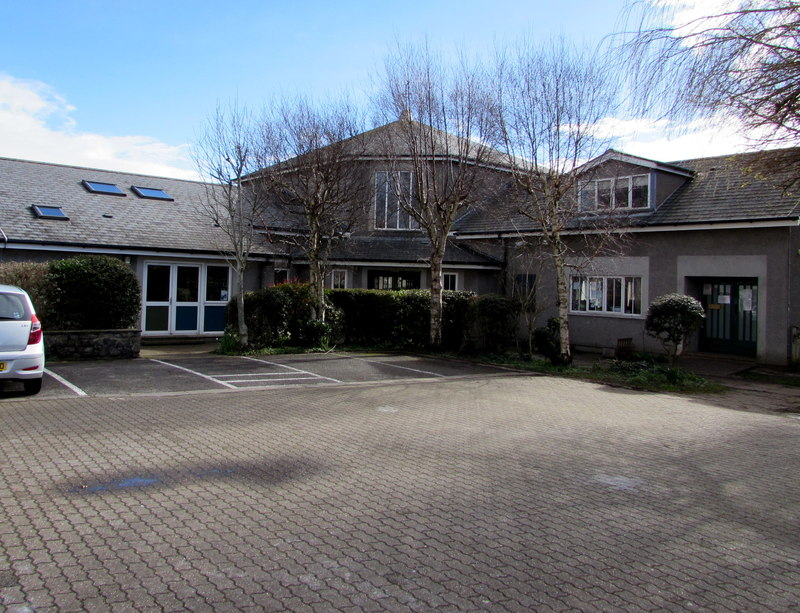
- St David's, Nottage
- 51.5321°N 3.2523°W
- Denomination: Church in Wales

History
- Status: Active
- Dedication: St David
- Consecrated: 6 November 1992

Architecture
- Functional status: sister church
- Years built: 1948, 1992

Administration
- Diocese: Diocese of Llandaff
- Parish: Newton Nottage

St David's Church, Nottage is an Anglican church in Nottage, South Wales.

== History ==
The village of Nottage is older than both Porthcawl and Newton. Thought to be of Saxon origin, its original name was Llanddewi, which translates as 'the enclosure around the Church of St David'. This early church was located beside the present Rose and Crown pub. Its graveyard was probably at the site of the village green, where human remains have been found. After the building of St Johns in 1190, community life centred around Newton. The ecclesiastical parish of Newton Nottage was formed before 1300, and the old church of Nottage fell out of use, last being mentioned in a manorial roll from 1630 (though accounts are at variance as to whether it was still functional).

== Modern Church ==
Nottage had no church until the postwar years. Before this, services had been held in a house on Redlands Street. In 1948, a wooden church formerly used by the RAF was erected on donated land. Two Nissen huts were also purchased, and were used as a schoolroom and anteroom. They lasted until 1968, when they were demolished and replaced with a purpose-built timber church hall. Part of the original 1948 site was sold in 1970. Parking facilities were added in 1978. In the early 1990s, the 1948 structure was wholly replaced with a new church, though the bell was saved. Services moved into the church hall until the present building was consecrated by Bishop Roy Davies in 1992. The new hall was completed in 1995.
