= David Yeoman =

Welsh archdeacon

David Yeoman (born 5 March 1944) is a Welsh Anglican bishop.

Yeoman was educated at the University College of South Wales and St. Michael's College, Llandaff. He was and ordained in 1971. After curacies in Cardiff and Caerphilly he held incumbencies in Ystrad Rhondda, Mountain Ash, Coity and Nolton before becoming Archdeacon of Morgannwg in 2004. In that year he was also consecrated to the episcopate and became Assistant Bishop of Llandaff from 2004 to 2009, working alongside Bishop of Llandaff and Archbishop of Wales Barry Morgan. He is an Honorary Assistant Bishop in the Diocese of Llandaff.

Church in Wales titles
Preceded by Martin Inffeld Williams	Archdeacon of Morgannwg; 2004–2006	Succeeded by Christopher Blake Walters Smith
