= Chris Smith (priest) =

Christopher Blake Walters Smith (born 1963) was the Archdeacon of Morgannwg from 2006 to 2020, when the archdeaconries of the diocese were reconfigured to remove the Archdeaconry and place its deaneries into the Archdeaconries of Llandaff and Margam. He is currently Vicar of Llanishen.

Smith was educated at the University of Wales and St. Michael's College, Llandaff, and was ordained in 1989. After a curacy in Aberdare he was Vicar of Tongwynlais from 1993 to 2000, and then Domestic Chaplain to the Bishop of Llandaff until his appointment as Archdeacon of Morgannwg. He became Priest-in-Charge of Cwmbach in 2007 whilst also fulfilling the duties of Archdeacon, leaving the benefice in 2020. He remains a metropolitical canon of the Church in Wales.

Church in Wales titles
Preceded by David Yeoman	Archdeacon of Morgannwg; 2006–2020	dissolved
