= St Catwg's Church, Gelligaer =

St Catwg's, Gelligaer
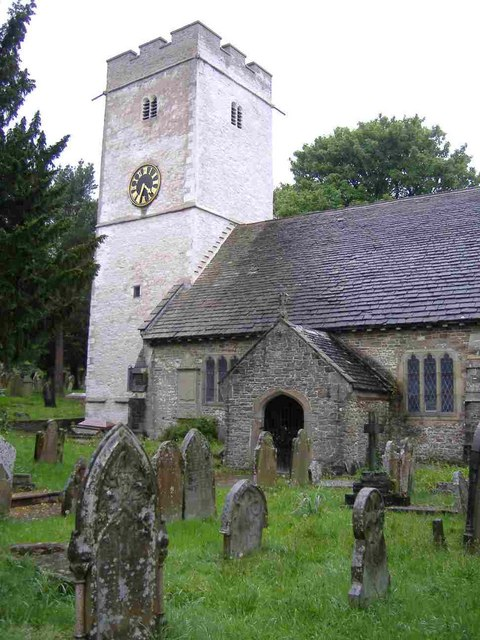
- St Catwg's, Gelligaer
- 51.6645°N 3.2512°W
- Denomination: Anglican

History
- Status: Active
- Founded: c. 6th century
- Dedication: Cadoc

Architecture
- Functional status: Parish Church
- Heritage designation: Grade II
- Designated: 18 July 2001

Specifications
- Materials: stone

Administration
- Diocese: Llandaff
- Archdeaconry: Morgannwg
- Deanery: Merthyr Tydfil & Caerphilly
- Parish: Gelligaer

St Catwg's Church, Gelligaer, is a listed place of worship in the community of Gelligaer in Caerphilly, South Wales.

== History ==
The site of a Roman fort, Gelligaer is believed to have been the site of St Catwg (or Cadoc)'s birth c. 500 AD. Cadoc's mother (according to most traditional accounts) was Gwladys, and Cadoc himself is recorded to have occupied a 'Capel Gwladys' in c. 530AD, the remains of which can still be seen. The date of the founding of the church itself is now unknown, but is believed to have occurred in 1266 (when the Normans secured the overlordship of local rulers). Little is known of the early years of the church's life, as the records from this period are now lost. A document found in the records of Cardiff shows that Jasper Tudor, Duke of Bedford (the uncle of Henry VII of England), who occupied Cardiff Castle from 1488, donated a peal of bells and an organ to the church in recognition of the loyalty of Glamorgan to the Tudor cause. St Catwg's was one of eight churches in the area which received such gifts, together with Llandaff Cathedral, which received a tower. The organ and bells survived until the Commonwealth years.

During the Reformation, the church's valuables were plundered and its records were lost. Papism prevailed in Gelligaer until the early 17th century. Several parishioners were summonsed in 1622 for refusing to attend Reformed services. The church's rector during the Commonwealth was ejected for refusing to accept a doctrinal change, and the church had no settled officiant for a decade after this. A parishioner named David Jones, who died in 1786, aged 92, was described as a 'professional papist'. Gelligaer was the richest living in the Diocese, though this led to incidents of clerical absenteeism, as the living was often granted to favoured candidates who had little interest in the welfare of their parishioners. The last case of this was one Thomas Stacy, who was rector of St Catwg's between 1827 and 1861, but spent almost all of this time at Llandaff, where he served concurrently as precentor. He was replaced by Canon Gilbert Harries, who took over the church in 1862, but by this time, the church was suffering from structural deterioration, which was in large part owed to the negligence of absentee clerics. In September 1866, the church's roof collapsed, and was restored by Charles Buckeridge in 1867–8. The interior plaster was removed in 1903. In 1931, a new vestry was added, and the former one converted into a lady chapel. St Catwg's became listed in 2001.

== Daughter churches ==
St Catwg's was historically part of a very large parish which spread over much of North Eastern Glamorgan. Increasing industrialisation in the 19th century and the corresponding rise in population led the parish to be segmented into smaller ones. St Catwg's later acquired two daughter churches (neither of which are listed) in the years following:

St Margaret's, Gilfach, was founded as a mission in 1895. The first church, built at the top of Margaret Street in 1903, was a small wooden structure, which was later replaced by a tin tabernacle at the present location on St Mary's Street. This was in turn transferred to the function of church hall after the present St Margaret's was completed beside it and consecrated on 29 November 1933. The wooden church was later moved to the location also, though both it and the tin tabernacle have since been demolished.

St Anne's, Cefn Hengoed, was started in Cefn Hengoed in 1931, which was replaced by St Anne's church in 1939, which operated until the early 2010s.

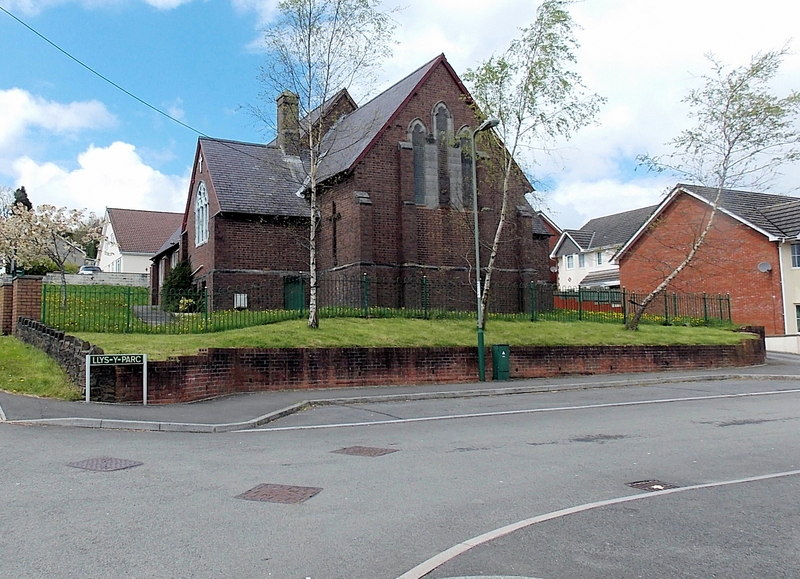
St Margaret's Church, Gilfach (1933)

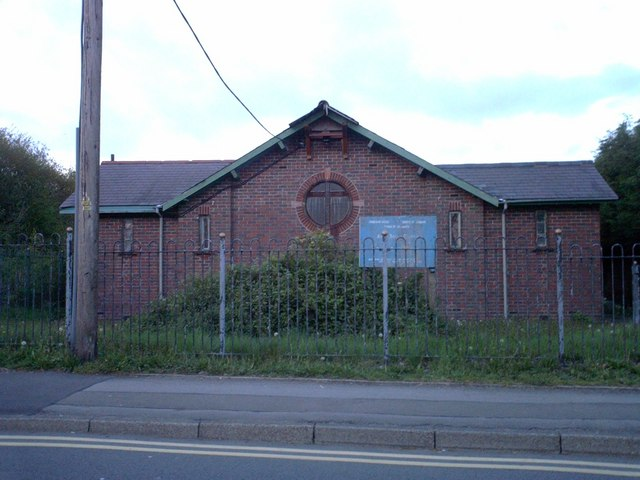
St Anne's Church, Cefn Hengoed (1939). Now defunct
