= Welsh St Donats =

Welsh St Donats: Welsh: Llanddunwyd
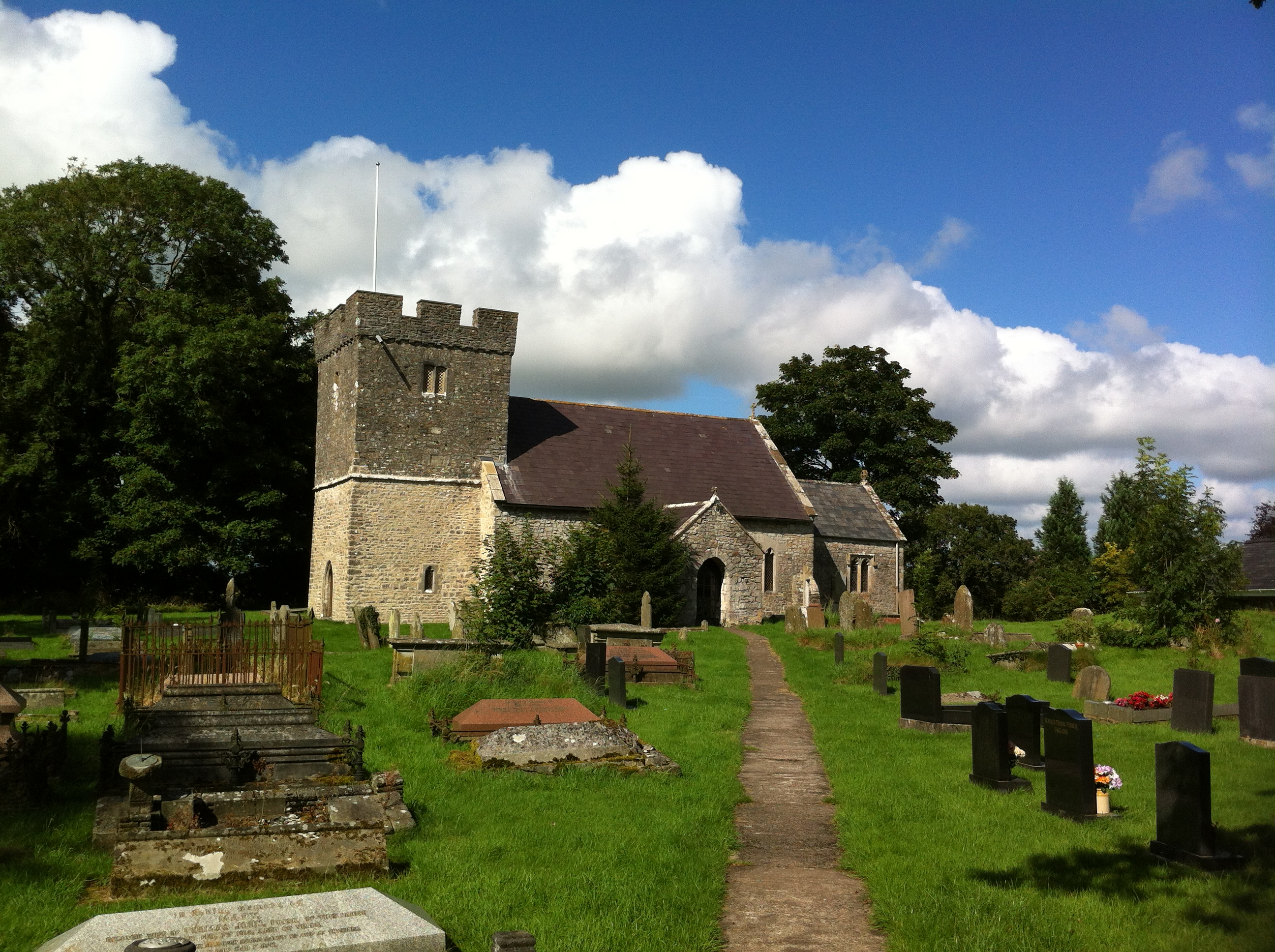
- St Donat's (St Dunwyd's) church

- Location within the Vale of Glamorgan
- Population: 534
- Principal area: Vale of Glamorgan
- Preserved county: South Glamorgan
- Country: Wales
- Sovereign state: United Kingdom
- Post town: Cowbridge
- Postcode district: CF71
- Dialling code: 01446
- Police: South Wales
- Fire: South Wales
- Ambulance: Welsh
- UK Parliament: Vale of Glamorgan
- Senedd Cymru – Welsh Parliament: Vale of Glamorgan
- List of places UK Wales Vale of Glamorgan 51.475088°N 3.401187°W Map of the community

Welsh St Donats (Welsh: Llanddunwyd) is a village and a community in the Vale of Glamorgan, Wales. Consisting of 1207 hectares of mainly rural land, it is located north east of Cowbridge. The population of the community was 534 in the 2011 census. Welsh St Donats includes the villages of Maendy, Prisk and Tair Onen. A mile to the east from the village lies the Hensol Forest, while the remains of Talyfan Castle are to the north.

== History ==
The village of St Donats takes its name from the late medieval church dedicated to St Dunwyd, which was first mentioned in 1173. Set in mainly agricultural lands the compact village contains the 18th century Great House and a fine farm group. Benjamin Heath Malkin mentions Welsh St Donats in his 1803 work The Scenery, Antiquities and Biography of South Wales, while passing along the 'great road' that ran north of the village, which linked England to the port of Milford Haven. He mentioned the varying style of genuine Welsh pigstye in the area and the fact that Welsh St Donats "... is perhaps scarcely a village in the principality, where less English is spoken." As of 2019, spoken Welsh in the Vale is one of the lowest levels in Wales, with less than ten percent of adults identifying themselves as Welsh speakers.

== Buildings of note ==
St Donat's Church, Welsh St Donats, is a Grade I listed building. It was described by Nikolaus Pevsner as "a simple late mediaeval church" despite being mentioned in 1173. However there are no architectural remains in the present structure from that period. The 16th century arched brace truss roof timbers and other features, such as the 13th century font to the south door, are of interest and note and therefore contribute to it being a Grade I listed building.

The church sits to the north end of a knot of houses, mostly recent, and within the middle of these lies the Great House. The Great House, is a two-storey 18th-century building of modest features consisting of three, three-bay units, the centre of which is higher than the sides. Prisk Farm, which is situated about a mile to the west, once boasted an elaborate modelled plaster ceiling, of 17th- or 18th-century design. Unique amongst the farm houses of the area, the ceiling was lost when it collapsed c. 1989.

To the north of Welsh St Donats lies the remains of Talyfan Castle (Welsh: Castell Tal-y-fan). Once serving as a caput for the Siwards and the St Quintins, Talyfan was one of several lordships within the Vale of Glamorgan during the 12th and 13th centuries. There is some speculation that it was built to replace the motte castle at Ystradowen, but was never completed. By the middle of the 13th century, the castle had passed from the Siwards to the ownership of Richard de Clare, Lord of Glamorgan. The Lords of Glamorgan held onto the castle the late 15th century when it reverted to the monarchy after the death of Jasper Tudor. It was bought by John Thomas Bassett of Llantrithyrd in 1545 and remained in private hands since. Today the remains of the castle stand on the lands of Talyfan Farm, though there is little left to see. The original protective ditch can be observed along with a length of the outer embankment. A jumble of ruined walls mark the remains of the castle itself along with those of the farm house that superseded it. It is presently under the ownership of CADW.

== Notable people ==
- Tom Jones (purchased a home in the village in the 1990s)

== See also ==
- St Donats
