= St Michael's Church, Michaelston-le-Pit =

Church in Michaelston-le-Pit, Vale of Glamorgan, Wales

Coordinates: 51.44944°N 3.22198°W

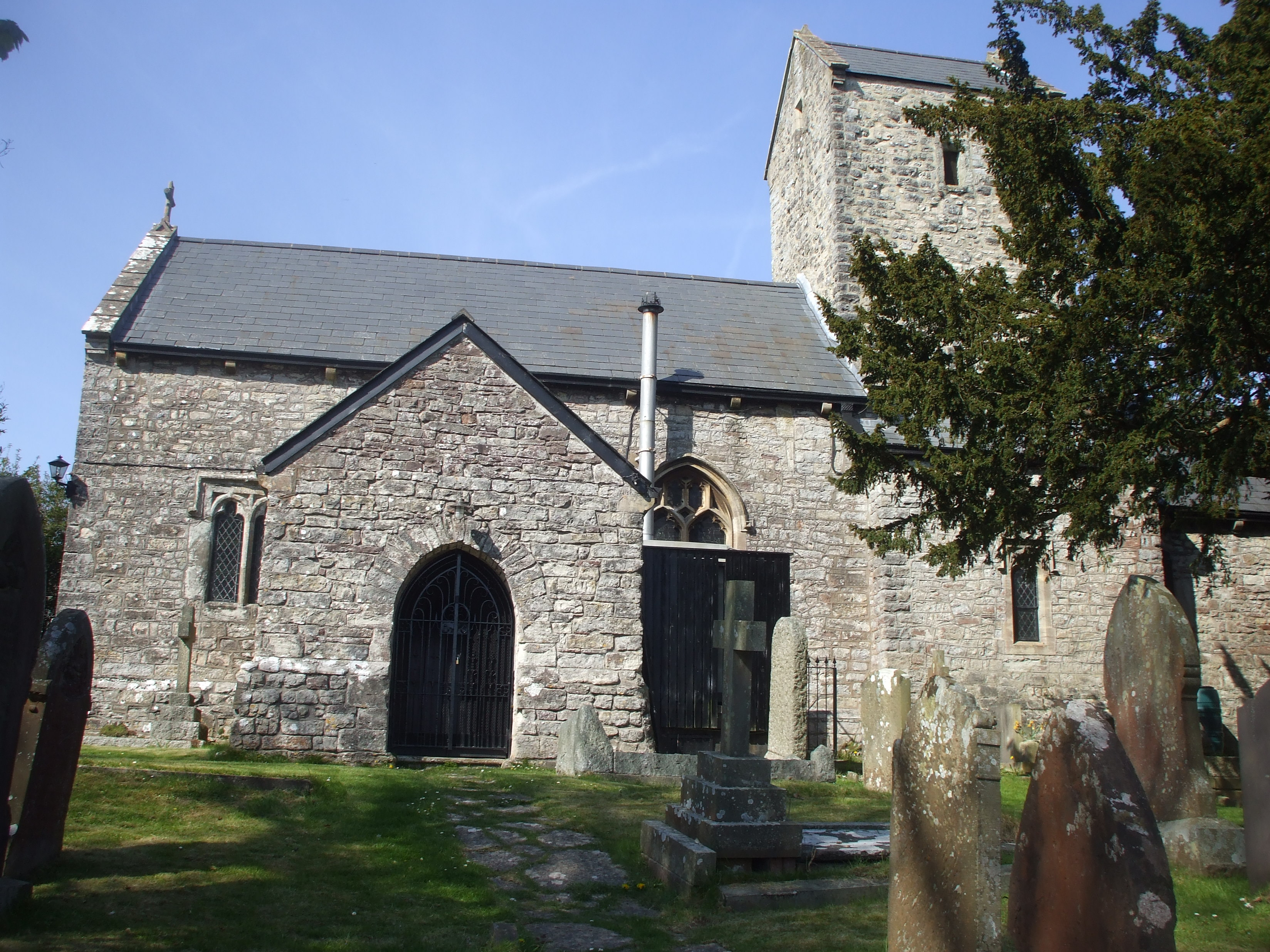
St Michael's Church

St Michael's Church is a Grade I listed church in Michaelston-le-Pit, in the Vale of Glamorgan, south Wales. It became a Grade I listed building on 28 January 1963. The church was probably built by the Reigny family; earliest records of it date to the Taxation of Norwich in 1254, where it was referred to as St Michael de Renny and was valued at four marks. The parish at one time consisted of the Manor of Michaelston-le-Pit and the church was an advowson included with the manor in the 15th and 17th centuries. By 1563, a cleric was in residence.

The church was known by a variety of names over time: "Michaelstowe" and "Michaelstown", which changed with the name of the land owner. In the 16th century it was called Michaelston le Pole, as the De la Pole family owned the manor before 1493. The present name is likely taken from le Peyt; the le Peyt family owned the land before selling it to the Reignys.

The church has many items which date to medieval times, including a baptismal font which was lost at the time of the Battle of St Fagans and was later discovered in a local field. It also has the only triple decker pulpit found in the Vale of Glamorgan. The lychgate of the churchyard is a memorial to local soldiers killed in World War I; it became a Grade II listed building 25 April 2002.
