= St John the Baptist Church, Danescourt =

Church in Cardiff, Wales

St John the Baptist
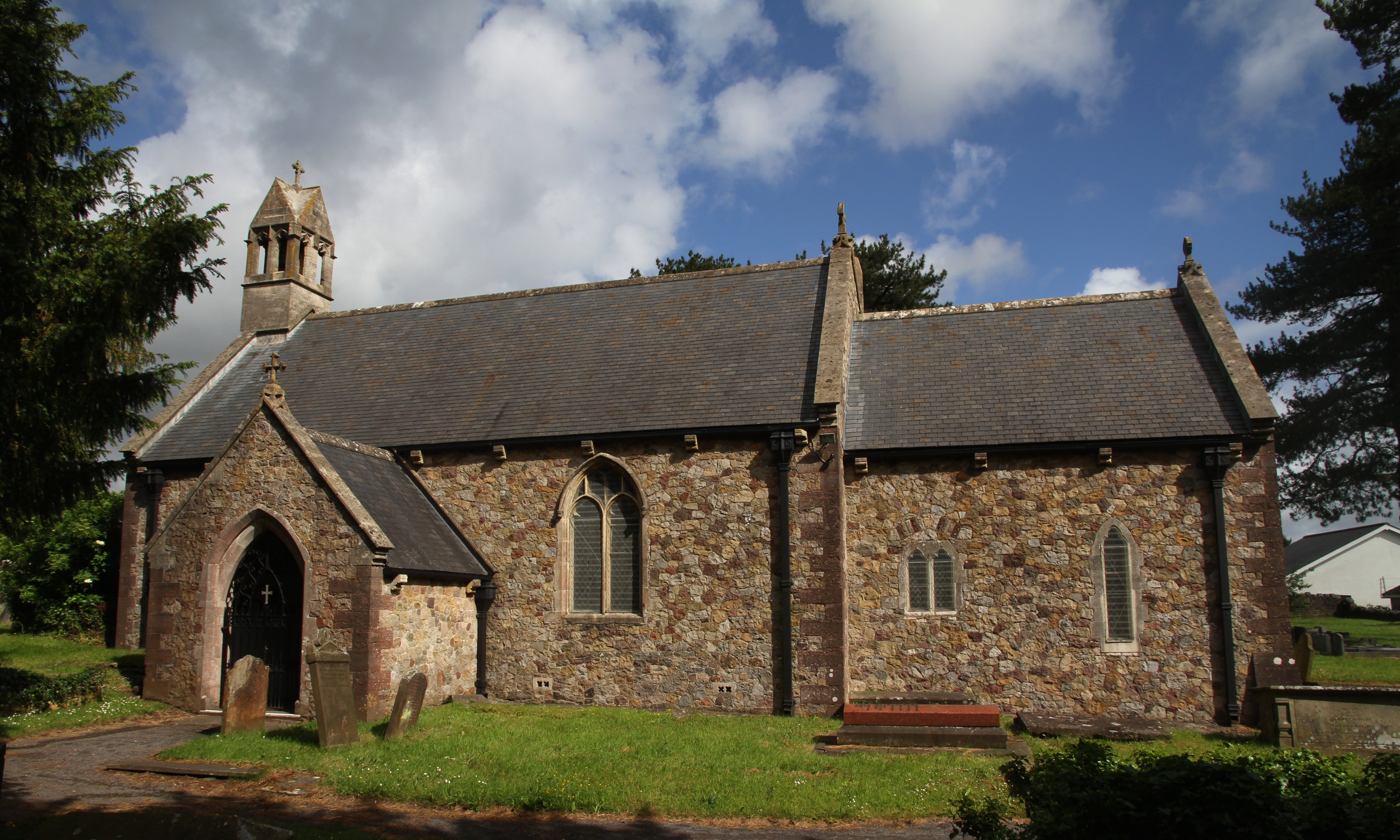
- St John the Baptist
- 51.503801°N 3.241574°W
- Denomination: Church in Wales
- Website: https://garthma.wales/our-churches-and-halls/st-johns-church-danescourt/

History
- Status: Active

Architecture
- Functional status: Parish church
- Heritage designation: II
- Designated: 19 May 1975
- Style: Perpendicular
- Years built: 14th Century

Administration
- Diocese: Diocese of Llandaff
- Archdeaconry: Llandaff
- Deanery: Radyr
- Parish: Radyr

Clergy
- Priest: Rev'd Mary Evans

The Church of St John the Baptist is a listed Anglican church which serves the suburbs of Radyr and Danescourt in Cardiff.

According to legend, the area of Radyr was the home in the 5th Century of a hermit named Tylywai, a disciple of St Cadog, who founded a chapel or wayside shrine there. The presence of an actual church is thought to date from the 11th Century; by which time the area was on the route of pilgrims travelling to Llandaf to pay respects to St Teilo. It is referred to in written records in 1254, by which time it was already long-established. The early church was replaced in the 13th Century. Elements of the Medieval architecture survive in the present building, though the church was extensively restored and modified by John Prichard in the 1860s, and further modifications occurred in the years following. The church, which was surrounded by fields until the 1970s, became listed in 1975.

The parents of the author Roald Dahl are buried in the churchyard.
