= St John the Evangelist Church, Cardiff =

Church in Cardiff, Wales

St John the Evangelist
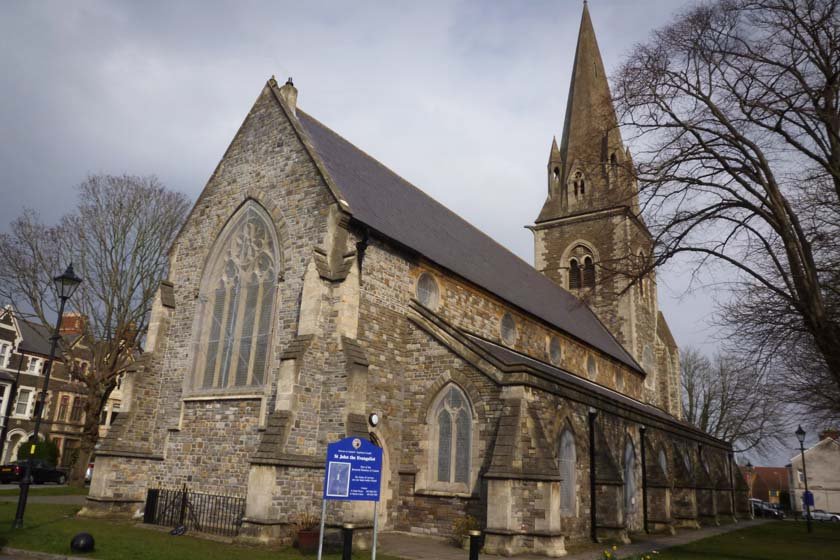
- St John's
- St John the Evangelist
- 51.4808°N 3.2024°W
- Denomination: Church in Wales

History
- Status: active
- Dedication: St John the Evangelist

Architecture
- Functional status: parish church
- Heritage designation: Grade II
- Designated: 18 May 1975
- Architect(s): J. Prichard & J.P. Seddon
- Groundbreaking: 1854
- Completed: 1902

Administration
- Diocese: Llandaff
- Parish: Canton

St John the Evangelist Church, Canton is a listed church in Cardiff, Wales. It is in the Rectorial Benefice of Canton.

== History ==
The hamlet of Canton was part of the Parish of Llandaff, but the population of the area swelled during the early 19th Century as Cardiff industrialised and expanded. By the 1850s, it was considered that the area needed a church of its own. St John's was designed by John Prichard and John Pollard Seddon. The church was built in stages over a period of nearly 50 years; the nave was built first in 1854–5, followed by the aisles in 1858–9. Construction then slowed and the steeple and chancel were not added until 1868–70. G.E. Haliday modified the spire and added a west bay in 1902. Additional minor alterations were carried out in the 1950s. The church's first minister was Vincent Saulez, who also played a part in the founding of St Paul's Church, Grangetown. The church was designated as a Grade II listed building in 1975.

The church has a triple-gabled reredos, an octagonal Victorian baptismal font and much stained glass of various ages (the most recent from 1981).
