= St Catherine's Church, Canton =

Church in Cardiff, Wales

St Catherine's, Canton
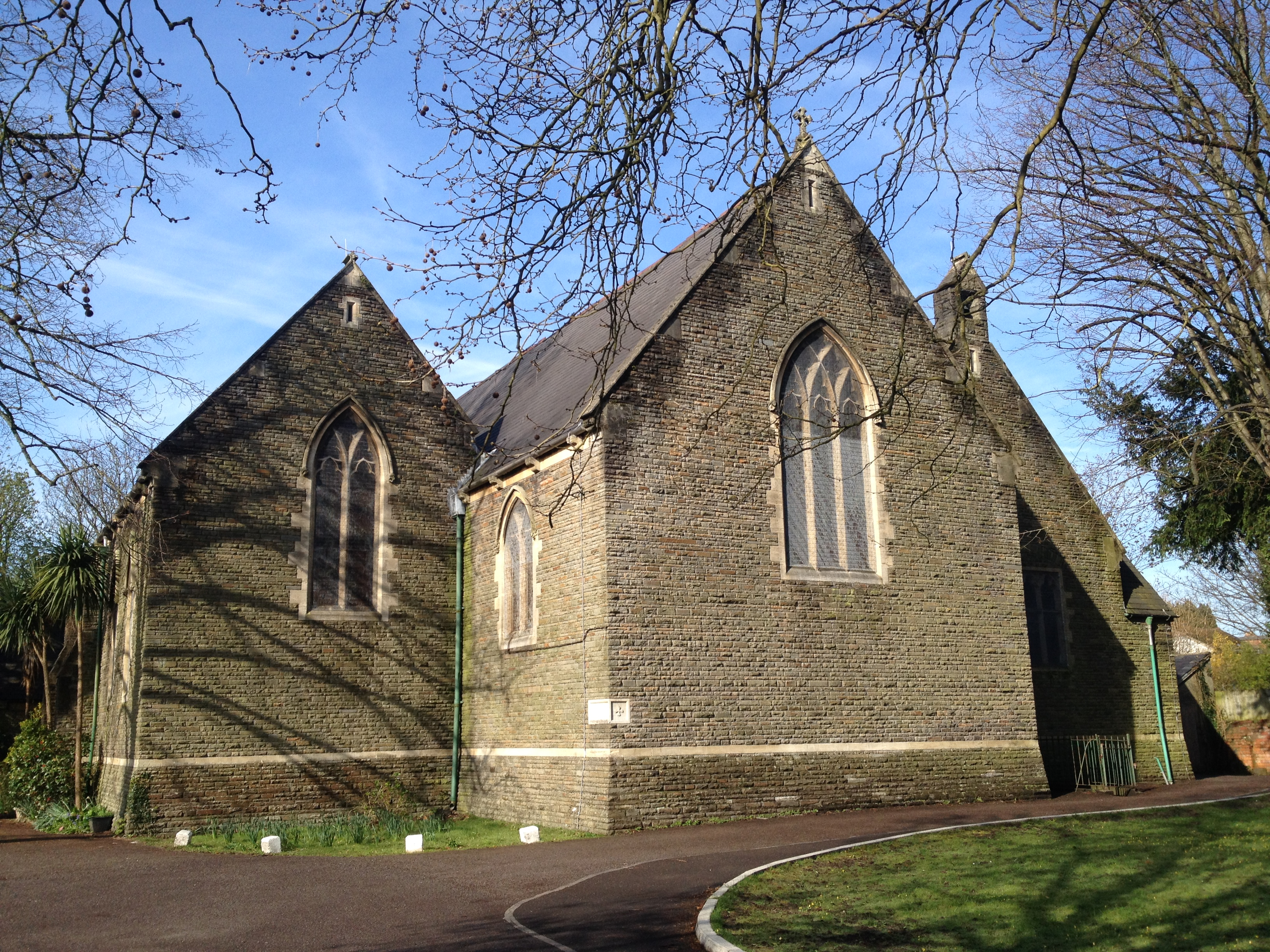
- St Catherine's in 2016
- St Catherine's, Canton
- 51.4854°N 3.1995°W
- Denomination: Church in Wales
- Website: St Catherine's Church, Canton

History
- Consecrated: 1885

Architecture
- Functional status: Active
- Heritage designation: Grade II
- Designated: 19 May 1975
- Architect: John Prichard
- Groundbreaking: 1883
- Completed: 1897

Specifications
- Materials: brick, stone

Administration
- Diocese: Llandaff
- Parish: Canton

St Catherine's Church, Canton is a listed Anglican church which serves the areas of Canton and Riverside in Cardiff, Wales.

Originally a small hamlet in the parish of Llandaff, separate from Cardiff, Canton had seen drastic urbanisation and expansion as Cardiff industrialised during the 19th Century. The church of St John the Evangelist had already been established in the 1850s, but as the area continued to grow, further places of worship were needed, even after St Johns had been enlarged in 1870. The first rector of St John's, the Reverend Vincent Saulez, founded St Catherine's in the early 1880s and later also founded St Paul's in Grangetown.

The founding stone of St Catherine's was laid by Catherine Vaughan, the wife of the Dean of Llandaff. She also contributed £1000 towards the building. It has been speculated that the church's name was influenced by this generosity. The plans of diocesan architect John Prichard had intended a cruciform design, but this proved overambitious, and Prichard built only three bays of the nave. The church opened in 1885 before Prichard had finished the project, and his death in 1886 caused the work to pause. It was later completed in two stages: first by Kempson & Fowler in 1892–3, who added the chancel, south chapel and north vestry. In 1897, G.E. Halliday added two bays at the west end. The church has a marble reredos and stained glass windows by Ninian Comper.

St Catherine's became a separate parish in 1895, but in the 20th Century, this was merged with St John's. It is now in the Rectorial Benefice of Canton, together with St John's and St Luke's. The church has been listed since 1975.
