= St David's Church, Laleston =

Church in Bridgend County Borough, Wales

Coordinates: 51.5065°N 3.6218°W

St David's Laleston
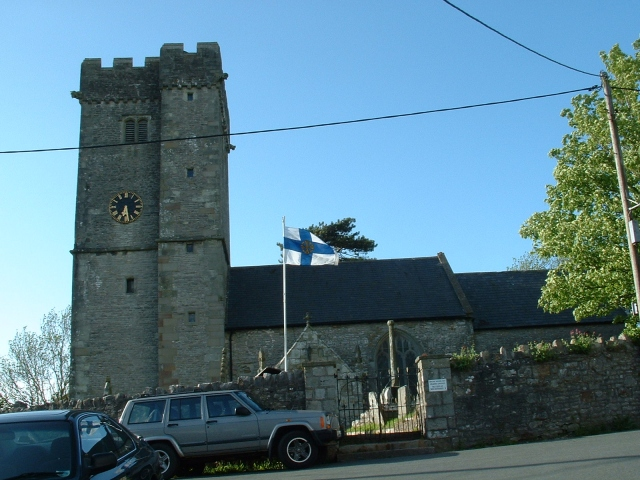
- St. David's Church

- Location in Bridgend County Borough
- Location: Laleston, Bridgend
- Country: Wales
- Denomination: Church in Wales

History
- Founded: 13th century
- Dedication: Saint David

Architecture
- Heritage designation: Grade I
- Architectural type: Church
- Style: Medieval

St David's Church, Laleston is a Grade I listed church in Laleston, Bridgend County Borough, southern Wales. It is listed Grade 1 as a medieval church with its fabric, including timber roofs, mainly intact, and having group value with the churchyard cross and Cliff Cottage.

== History ==
In 1180, William, Earl of Gloucester is recorded as having granted land in the area to William Lageles, from whom the village is thought to have got its name. The current church was built later, to replace the nearby church of St Cewydd, the site of which is known. The nave and chancel are believed to date to the late 13th and 14th centuries, and the southern porch and tower to the later medieval period.

During the 16th century the church and the manor of Laleston belonged to Margam Abbey, and in 1522, the parishioners were given a lease on the tithe barn. At the Dissolution, Sir Rice Mansel purchased the manor.

Those who officiated as parish priests or curates over the years included John Evans (died 1847) who later turned to Methodism.

Sir Stephen Glynne, 9th Baronet, visited the church in 1847, and left a written account of the architecture.

== Architecture ==
The church is built on a standard plan, with a west tower, nave and lower chancel. It has, probably incorrectly, been attributed to a 12th-century mason called "Lalys".

The tower interior is in the Perpendicular Gothic style. The church underwent restoration by John Prichard in 1871, and the stained glass windows, probably by Clayton and Bell, are from that decade.

== Interior ==
The interior is limewashed, and features numerous engravings on the walls, dated to the 17th and 18th centuries. The chancel stalls, of oak, and the desk and pulpit date to 1958. William Clarke of Llandaff was hired for wood carvings in the sanctuary; he added the reredos in 1908. St David's Church became a Grade I listed building on 26 July 1963.

== Memorials ==
Several graves of the Ben(n)et family of Laleston House (located close to the church), a family notable locally in the 17th and 18th centuries, are to be found in the church. In 1762, Thomas Bennet left a legacy of £52 10s for poor relief.

== Bibliography ==
- Newman, John (1995). Glamorgan. London: Penguin Group. ISBN 0140710566.
