= St Anne's Church, Cefn Hengoed =

Church in Cefn Hengoed, Wales

St Anne's, Cefn Hengoed
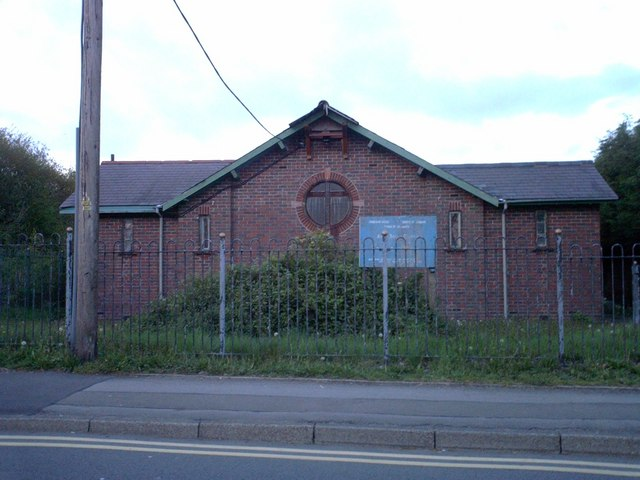
- St Anne's in 2007
- St Anne's, Cefn Hengoed
- 51.657996°N 3.235865°W
- Denomination: Church in Wales

History
- Former name: Cefn Hengoed Mission Church
- Status: Disused
- Founded: 1931
- Founder: John Owen Williams
- Dedication: St Anne

Architecture
- Completed: 1939
- Construction cost: £800+
- Closed: 2015

Specifications
- Materials: brick

Administration
- Diocese: Diocese of Llandaff
- Archdeaconry: Morgannwg
- Deanery: Merthyr Tydfil & Caerphilly
- Parish: Gelligaer

St Anne's Church, Cefn Hengoed is a disused Church in Wales church in Cefn Hengoed, Caerphilly in South Wales.

The church dates from 1939 and was founded by Reverend John Owen Williams, who had started a cottage Sunday school in Cefn Hengoed in 1931. A Second World War air raid shelter is located at the side of the church.

The church required extra funds for a refurbishment in 2010. By 2015, the church was defunct, and together with some adjoining land, was offered for sale with a starting price of £150,000.
