= St Canna Church, Llangan =

Church in the Vale of Glamorgan, Wales

Coordinates: 51.48977°N 3.50286°W

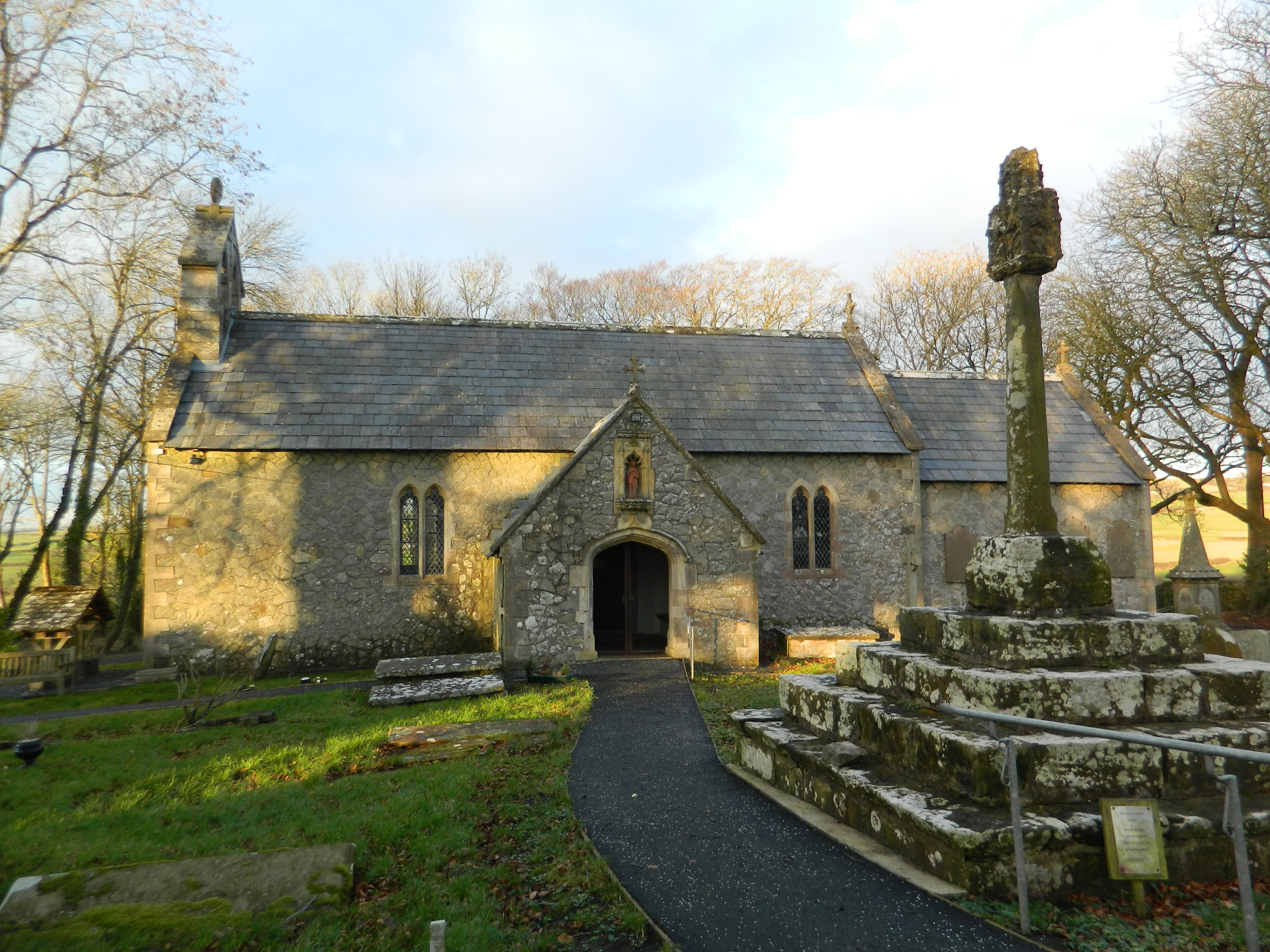
St Canna's Church, with the churchyard cross in the foreground

St Canna Church is a church in Llangan, in the Vale of Glamorgan, south Wales. Its churchyard cross is a Grade I listed building, listed on 22 July 2003.

The church is believed to date from the 12th or 13th century. It is said to have been rebuilt in 1820, but by 1875 it was described as being deserted and full of insects, snails and weeds. A publication four years later stated that the church was "about to be removed" because the population had moved away from the area.

The church is said to have been extensively rebuilt in 1856 with more work being done in 1869. Many of its original features were destroyed during this time period. A school room was added to the structure in 1881. In 1909 a pre-Norman cross was discovered in the garden of the church rectory. The cross is believed to date from the ninth century; it was not intact when found but was pieced together. The church rectory, where the Celtic cross was found, became a Grade II listed building 22 July 2003.

In 1932 a stained glass window was installed behind the altar to the memory of Reverend David Jones, the parish priest and an early supporter of Welsh Calvinistic Methodism, who was known as the "Angel of Llangan" for his religious work in the village. The church has two bells, one possibly dating from medieval times and one cast in 1891; both were rehung in the bell tower in 2005. The church vestry had been closed for some time because it was in extreme disrepair. In 2010 a grant to aid community projects was received and the vestry was able to be repaired. It now serves as a meeting place for the church and the community.
