= St Augustine's Church, Penarth =

St Augustine's Church
- Eglwys Sant Awstin
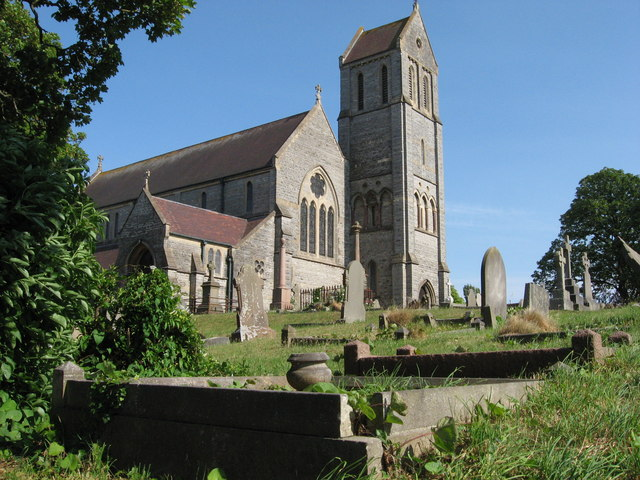
- The Church of St Augustine's
- St Augustine's Church
- 51.4415°N 3.1691°W
- Location: Penarth, Vale of Glamorgan
- Country: Wales, United Kingdom
- Denomination: Church in Wales

History
- Founded: 13th century
- Dedication: St Augustine of Hippo

Architecture
- Heritage designation: Grade I
- Architectural type: Church
- Style: Victorian

St Augustine's Church (Welsh: Eglwys Sant Awstin) is a Grade I-listed Gothic Revival nineteenth-century parish church in Penarth, Vale of Glamorgan, Wales.

== History ==
Written records indicate there has been a church on this site since 1242. In 1183, the site was given to the Black Canons of St Augustine by Osbert de Pennard. William de Saltmarsh, who later became Bishop of Llandaff, ordered the building of the first church on the site. The original church, built in 1242, was demolished in 1865 to make way for a newer, larger church.

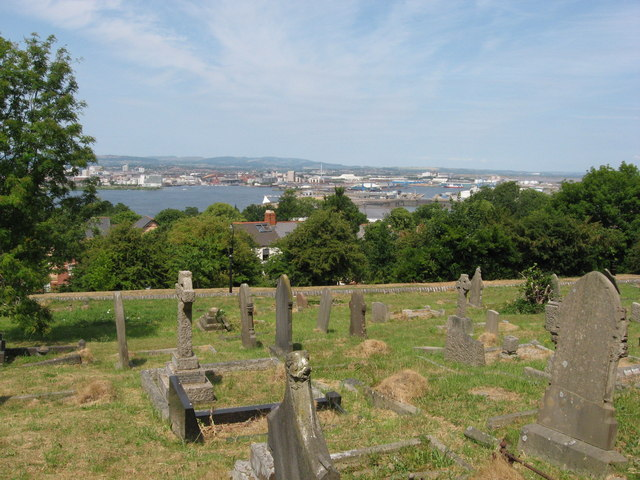
View of Cardiff Bay from the churchyard

Situated on Pen Arth (the Bear's Head) on Cardiff Bay, the church is able to be seen from a distance. The original church had a Norman-style tower, which was used as a navigation landmark by pilots in Bristol Channel. The first plans for the new church were for a short and square tower. Due to the complaints of the channel pilots, the plans for the new church were altered to provide for a 90-foot tower. The tower caused concern during World War II because it could have been used by the Germans as a visual guide to bomb the docks at Cardiff.

The present church was commissioned by Harriet Windsor-Clive, 13th Baroness Windsor to replace a church which was no longer large enough for the growing parish. (Note: The Baroness first attended worship at the church in 1869,) The building was designed by architect William Butterfield and built between 1865 and 1866, at the cost of £10,000. The present church, which seats 1,000, was built over the site of the original church.

Little of the interior has been changed since its construction. The new building's tower held six bells, which were in place not long after the completion of the church. In 1935, these bells were re-cast and a total of eight bells were made from them in the process. The church has an organ built in 1895 by William Hill & Sons. The medieval cross which was formerly in the churchyard is now inside near the Lady Chapel altar and is a Scheduled Monument. The building became Grade I listed on 4 April 1989 as the church is "this important architect's most ambitious building in Wales, an unspoilt textbook example of high Victorian church architecture."

== Description ==
The church was designed in the a spare Early English version of the then-popular Gothic Revival style with a prominent saddleback tower. The walls have Leckwith limestone facings, bath stone dressings and bands, and red Staffordshire tiles. The gables have parapets and are surmounted by carved crucifix finials and moulded kneelers. The buttresses are low and set back with steep set-offs. The four-storey tower has a corbelled saddle, corner buttresses, and triple arcades to the lower storey. The interior has polychrome brick patterns and bath stone dressings on red bricks. The stilted low-pitch chancel roof has stellar-pattern ribs and crenellated wall plates; the nave roof is steeper with wall posts to the main trusses.

John Newman described the new church as "one of Butterfield's finest churches, big boned and austere outside, highly charged in the polychromatic patterning of its interior".

== Churchyard ==
The churchyard was described as being in a "pitiful" state in 2015 by the Friends of St Augustine's. The group proposed to redevelop it into a public park, saying that many graves have decayed, making for hazardous walking in the churchyard. They also cited the growing cost of the churchyard's upkeep. The concept is not a new one; other churchyards in other areas have already been turned into public parks. The proposal is to create areas for seating and wildlife, while identifying the more historic grave sites. The group received a grant to assist in determining whether such a plan would work for the churchyard. Notable persons buried at St Augustine's include Welsh composer Joseph Parry. Until Penarth Cemetery was opened in 1903, the St Augustine churchyard was the only burial place in the town.

There are 14 Commonwealth War Graves Commission memorials in the churchyard, marking the burial place of British and Commonwealth soldiers. They commemorate 10 soldiers from the First World War and four soldiers from the Second World War. One of the graves commemorates a member of the Australian Infantry.
