= St James's Church, Pyle =

Church in Pyle, Bridgend County Borough, Wales

Coordinates: 51°31′50″N 3°41′41″W

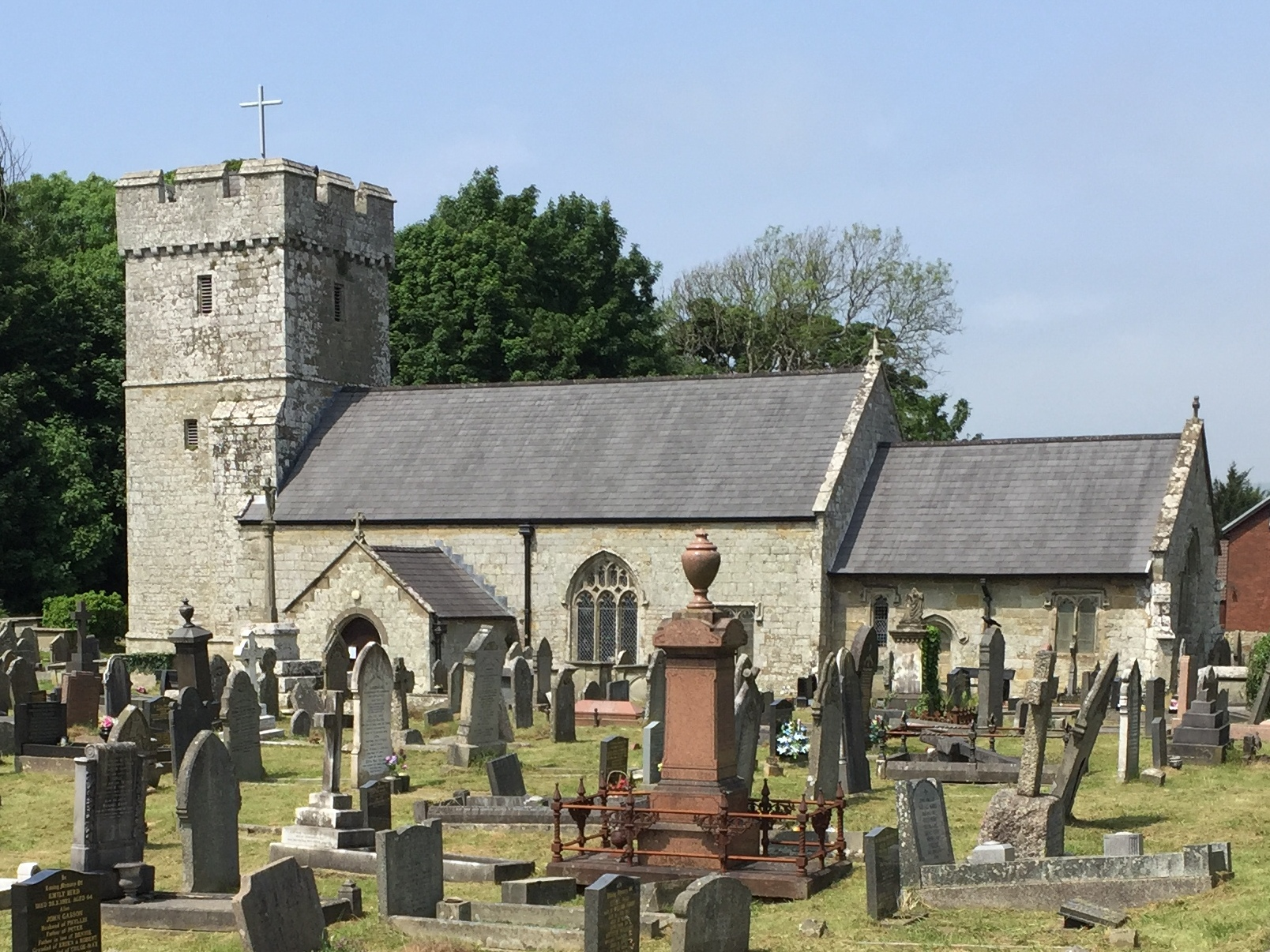
St James's Church

St James's Church is a Grade I listed church in Pyle, Bridgend County Borough, south Wales. A church was present in the area during the Norman period, but due to sand invasion by the later 14th century a new church had to be built, using some of the earlier materials. The date 1471 displayed on the roof indicates that the church was rebuilt at that time. In 1877 the church was extensively renovated, and it was further restored by F. W. Waller in 1891, when the chancel was given a new roof and the church was fitted with a new organ chamber. St James's Church became a Grade I listed building on 26 July 1963.
