= Nottage =

Village in Wales

Coordinates: 51.4910°N 3.7116°W

Nottage: Welsh: Notais
- Location within Bridgend
- Population: 3,293
- OS grid reference: SS812782
- Principal area: Bridgend
- Preserved county: Mid Glamorgan
- Country: Wales
- Sovereign state: United Kingdom
- Post town: PORTHCAWL
- Postcode district: CF36
- Dialling code: 01656
- Police: South Wales
- Fire: South Wales
- Ambulance: Welsh
- UK Parliament: Bridgend
- Senedd Cymru – Welsh Parliament: Bridgend

Nottage (Welsh: Notais) is a small village part of Porthcawl in Bridgend County Borough, Wales. It is also the name of an electoral ward to the town and county councils.

== History ==
The original ancient village of Nottage, built in a defensive position from the outset, was sited on a small hill near an inlet leading to the sea. The location is speculated to have been chosen to reduce the risks of attacks by Vikings. Artifacts found in and near Nottage hint the presence in the area of the Beaker culture, Celts and Romans.

In the 12th century, William Fitz Robert, 2nd Earl of Gloucester gave 'New Town in Margam' to his supporter Richard of Cardiff. Nottage lay just outside it. Already the location of a Celtic church, Norman influence grew in the area, and the Parish of Newton-Nottage was formed in around 1300. Nottage Court (also known as 'The Grange' and 'Noche Court', later 'Ty Mawr') were administered by Margam Abbey. After the Dissolution of the Monasteries, it was sold to the Lougher family in 1545 and rebuilt in around 1570, though parts of the pre-1570 structure remain, despite another extensive renovation in 1855.

The ancient church of Nottage was located beside the present Rose and Crown pub. A manorial survey of 1630 shows that there was already a church in the village which was associated with Saint David (though the present church dates only from the 1940s). Nottage became the site of some of the earliest Nonconformist activity in Wales. John Myles had preached there in 1657. After the Royal Declaration of Indulgence in 1672, Walter Cradock and Howell Thomas were authorised to preach there. Methodist and Baptist presences in Nottage were formalised in 1743 and 1789 respectively.

In 1849, A Topographical Dictionary of Wales recorded that Nottage had a population of 467. It had risen to 1,082 by 1861 as recorded in the original Imperial Gazetteer of England and Wales, which described Nottage as 'a decayed watering-place'.

Nottage was formerly served by Nottage Halt railway station on the Porthcawl branch-line, which closed in 1965.

West Park Primary School was opened in 1971.

== Facilities ==
Nottage has a convenience store, a hair salon named salon Amici, a primary school and a few public houses and bed and breakfast establishments. The village is the location of the Royal Porthcawl Golf Club, founded in 1891.

There are two places of worship in Nottage:

- St David's, operated by the Church in Wales.
- Nottage General Baptist & Unitarian Church, shared by Unitarians and Baptists.

== Governance ==
Nottage is an electoral ward to Porthcawl Town Council, electing four of the 19 town councillors.

The electoral ward has also elected a county councillor to Bridgend County Borough Council since 1999. The ward has generally elected a Liberal Democrat councillor with the exception of the 2004 council elections.
