= St Donat's Church, Welsh St Donats =

Church in the Vale of Glamorgan, Wales

Coordinates: 51.47697°N 3.40115°W

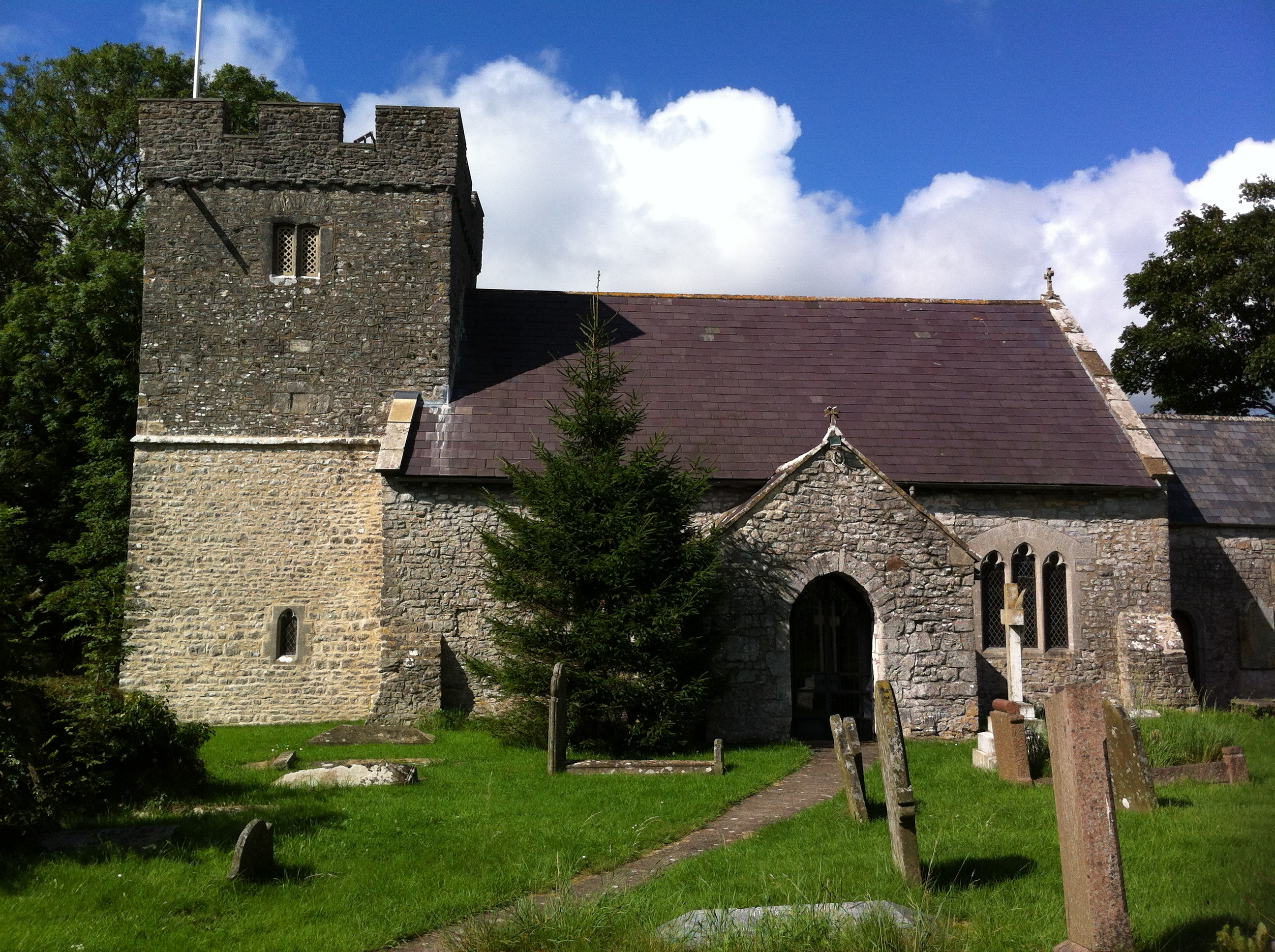
St Donat's Church

St Donat's Church is a Grade I listed church in Welsh St Donats, in the Vale of Glamorgan, south Wales. It became a Grade I listed building on 28 January 1963. Records of 1180 describe the church as a chapel confirmed to the Abbey of Tewkesbury. By 1563 it was known to have served as a parish church for the community. In 1603 it was considered to be a chapel of the church at Llanblethian, but by 1764 it received a stipend from Queen Anne's Bounty and was described as a curacy.

== 19th century ==
As early as 1859, the church was reported as being in need of repair. In 1890, a local newspaper reported that the church was in such poor condition it was "unfit for use". The news story also noted that it would undergo a major restoration; this was done by Kempson and Fowler and completed the next year with opening ceremonies held 14 October 1891.

A local newspaper story detailed the structural problems with the church prior to the start of restoration. The church's open oak roof was unsafe, plaster was falling from its walls and the floor was continuously damp. The window glaze needed work and water came in through the tower, which was cracked and unsafe. In addition, there was neither heat nor light in the building. The restoration of 1891 restored the oak roof, repaired the windows' glaze and freshly re-plastered the church walls. The flooring problem was resolved and repairs were made to the tower where it was deemed necessary. New lighting, a new heating unit and two new windows were installed, as well as a new pulpit altar, lectern and much new seating throughout.

== 20th century to present day ==
In 1893, the local newspaper published a request for donations to help with additional renovations needed at the church. The story said no provisions were made for control of rain water in the 1891 restoration and it was seeping into the walls from parapets and gutters. The restoration work completed in 1891 also did not include all needed repairs to the tower; it was reported that work on the tower would be postponed because the most immediate need was to control the rain problem. The church received new lighting and a new organ along with other restoration in 1915.

The church was re-plastered in 1996; during this process, the church was stripped of its old coat of plaster, leaving the entire structure bare to stones and mortar. This became an opportunity to do further dating on the building by examining the old mortar. It was thought that the church was constructed some time in the 15th to 16th centuries. but it became apparent that the windows and doors from that time frame were inserted into older walls by examining the mortar. A chancery wall gave evidence of having two lancet windows at one time; this was an indication that at least this portion of the building was constructed in the 13th century. The churchyard wall became a Grade II listed building on 21 December 2004.
