= Llanfihangel-y-traethau =

- Parish
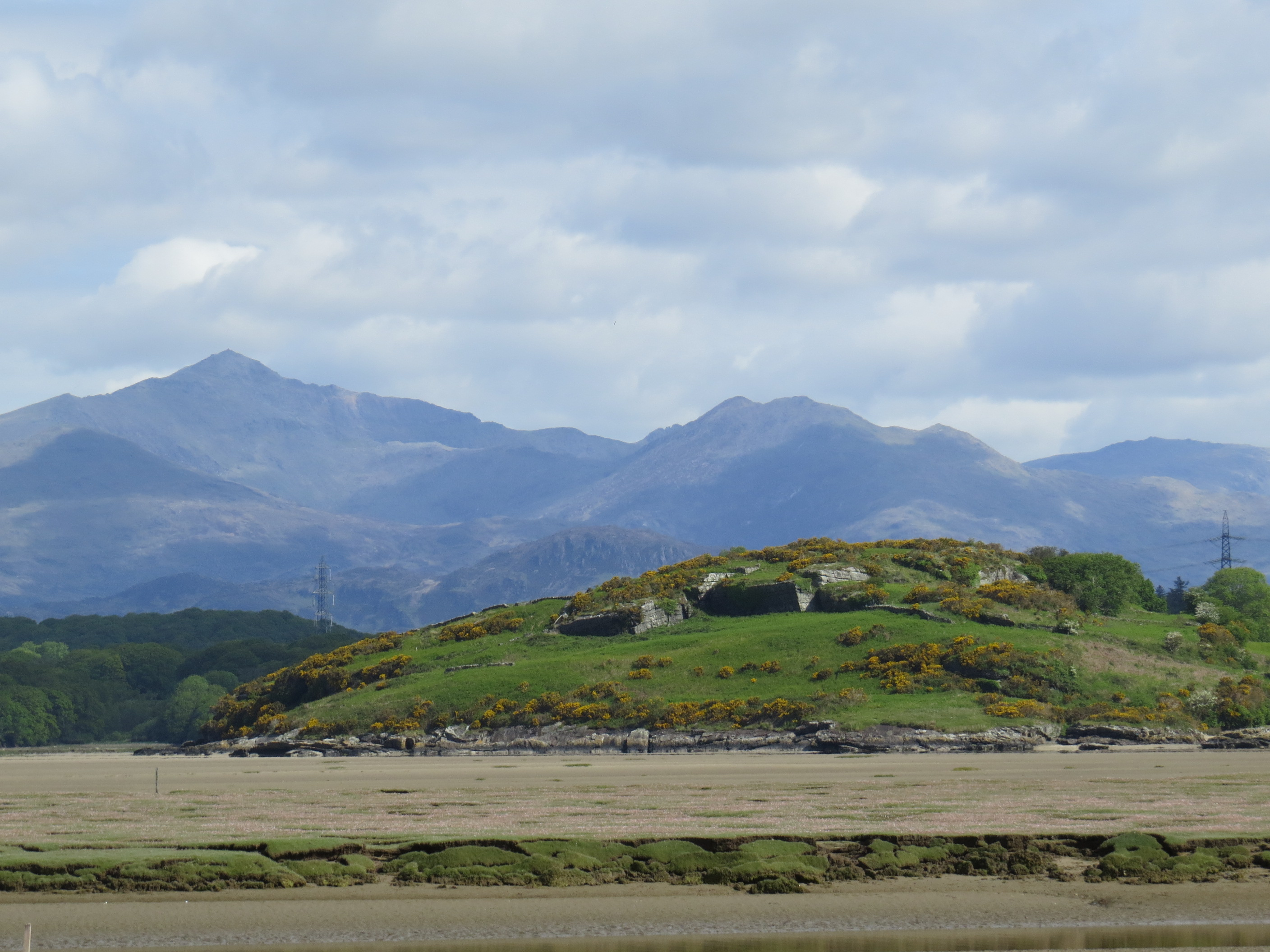

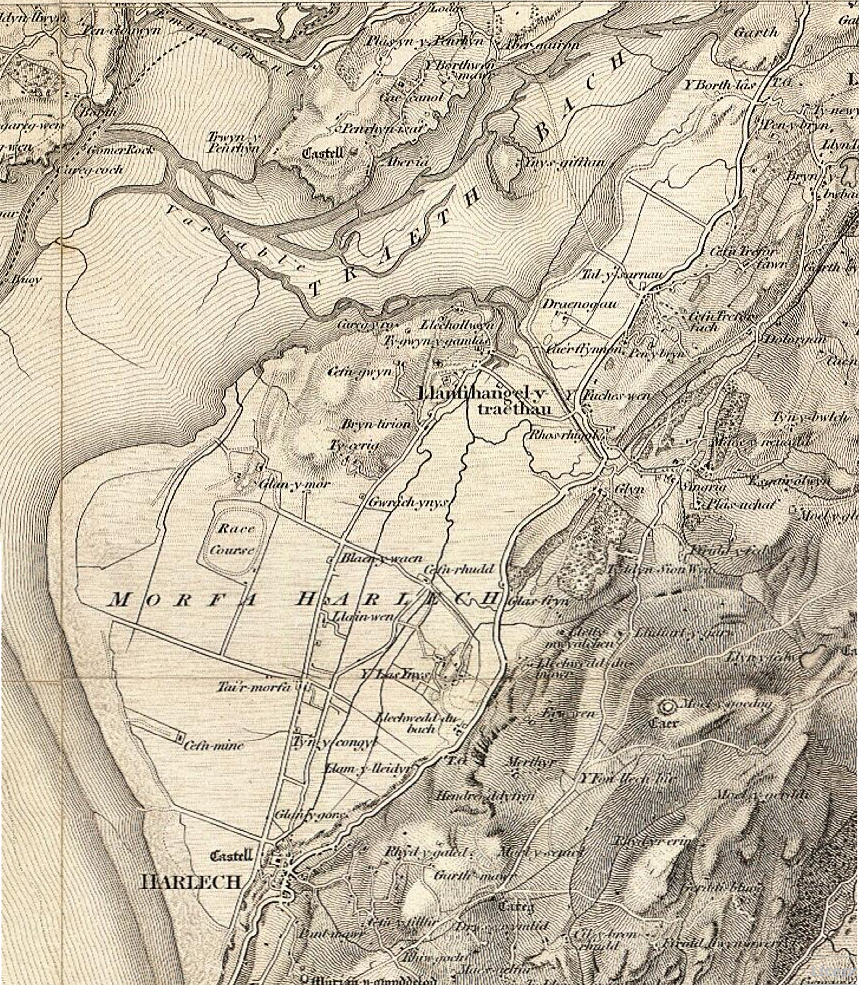
- Llanfihangel-y-traethau vicinity c. 1850

- Location in Gwynedd, Wales
- Coordinates: 52.897477°N 4.090183°W
- Country: Wales
- Gwynedd: Local government area
- Ardudwy: Area

Llanfihangel-y-traethau ("St. Michael's on the Beaches") was a parish in Ardudwy, Gwynedd, north-west Wales centred on a church of the same name in the village of Ynys. The original parish church was built in the 12th century on a tidal island. Later the land rose and connected the island to the mainland. Today it is part of the Bro Ardudwy ministry area, which includes Harlech, a few miles (kilometres) to the southwest, and Barmouth. The church has a window depicting Saint Tecwyn and is the start of the Saint Tecwyn's Way, a pilgrimage route ending at Saint Tecwyn's church in Llandecwyn.

== Etymology ==
The name means "St. Michael's of the Beaches", and the church was one of several "St. Michael's Mounts" along the shores of the ancient Celtic world, including the famous St Michael's Mount in Cornwall and Mont Saint-Michel in Normandy. The village name, Ynys, means 'island'.

== Location ==
The church of Llanfihangel-y-traethau is half a mile from the coast 3.25 miles (5.23 km) north east of Harlech. When the church was built it was on a rocky, tidal island, reached across the sands at low tide or by boat at high tide. (The rivers Glaslyn and Dwyryd once met near Llanfihangel Church, then ran southwest to reach the sea at Harlech.) The sea between Harlech and Ynys retreated in the late Middle Ages, and in 1810 a sea wall was built from Ynys to the 'mainland' near Glan-y-Wern, and another from Glany-Wern to Bont Briwet, the toll bridge to Penrhyndeudraeth. In 1856 plans were made to drain the marshland between Talsarnau and Harlech, to be followed by construction of the lower road (now the main road, the A496) from Talsarnau via Ynys to Harlech.

Formerly the parish included the coast from the mouth of the Afon Glaslyn to the parish of Llandanwg, which included Harlech. The parish included the Penrhyndeudraeth–Portmeirion peninsula across the river. As of 1870 the parish was a sub-district of the Ffestiniog district. The parish covered 7,567 acres (3,062 ha) of which 2,656 acres (1,075 ha) were water. The land near the river Dwyryd was marshy, although further inland it is hilly, extending as far as the Rhinogs. Penrhyndeudraeth became a separate parish in 1897.

== Parish history ==
Saint Tecwyn, who lived in the early 6th century, came to Britain from Gaul (France) in the time of Vortigern to renew Christianity in Britain. He founded the church in Llandecwyn to the northeast of Ynys. In 1073 a battle was fought near the present village at Bron-yr-Erw between Trahaearn ap Caradog and Gruffudd ap Cynan, two Welsh chieftains. The current church of Llanfihangel-y-traethau was established by the mid-12th century. Seagoing vessels were built at Tŷ Gwyn Gamlas near Ynys before the shipyards of Porthmadog were developed. A 1610 map shows the canal from Tŷ Gwyn almost all the way to Harlech Castle.

In the 16th century, Llanfihangel was a chapel of ease for the Llandecwyn parish. A 1623 report says that two or three services are held in Llandecwyn each year, and only one in Llanfihangel. Ellis Wynne of Lasynys Fawr, Rector of Llandanwg and author of Gweledigaethu'r Bardd Cwsg (Visions of the Sleeping Bard), was married in Llanfihangel-y-traethau in 1698. The curate who ministered to the parishes of Llandecwyn and Llanfihangel lived in Tŷ Fry outside Penrhyndeudraeth in the 18th century. The population of the parish in 1801 was 669.

In 1824 plans were published to build a turnpike road from Harlech to the embankment of Traethmawr in the parish. A plan was also made to build a railway from quarries owned by Lord Newborough and others in Ffestiniog parish to the south end of the Traethmawr embankment. Funds were raised in 1834 to build a house for the Rector of Llanfihangel-y-Traethau in Tyddyn Eglwys, near the church. An 1837 gazetteer gave the population as 1,026. The curacy had an annual value of £65. The parish population was 1,587 in 1851 and 1,687 in 1861, with 385 houses, mostly the property of a few landowners. As of 1861 the Ffestiniog workhouse in the parish had 32 inmates.

On 7 May 1858 the Ecclesiastical Commissioners for England proposed to constitute "a separate district for spiritual purposes out of the parishes of Llanfihangel-y-Traethau, Llandecwyn, and Llanfrothen, in the county of Merioneth and in the diocese of Bangor. A sum of £5000 in 3% annuities had been donated by Louisa Jane Oakley, widow, of Plas Tanybwlch, to support the minister of the new district of Penrhyn once it had a parish for ecclesiastical purposes. As of 1868 there was also a district church at Penrhyn Deudraeth and two Methodist chapels.

The Barmouth and Carnarvon railway was completed about the end of 1866, with a station in the parish. In 1927 and again in 1936 the tide overflowed the sea wall and flooded the farmland around Talsarnau. Many animals were drowned and the railway and buildings were badly damaged. The writer and academic Richard Hughes (1900 - 1976) was church warden, and is buried in the churchyard. Today the parish is part of the Bro Ardudwy ministry area, which includes Harlech, a few miles (kilometres) to the southwest, and Barmouth.

== Church ==
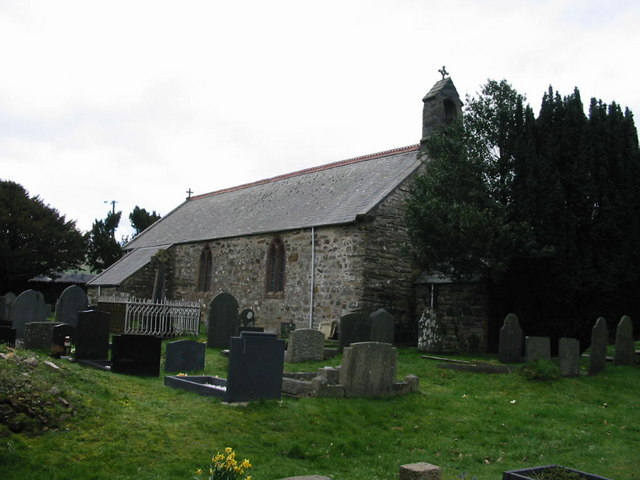
Church of Llanfihangel-y-traethau

The graveyard of the church of Llanfihangel-y-traethau has a carved stone about 6 feet (1.8 m) high, with a square cross-section of about 0.15 to 0.2 metres (6 in to 8 in) across. It has a 12th century inscription reading in Latin, after expanding abbreviations,

Hoc (or perhaps Hic) est sepulchrum Wleder matris
Odeleu qui primus edificavit
hanc ecclesiam
in tempore vvini regis

This means, "Here is the grave of Wleder mother of Hoedliw who first built this church in the reign of King Owain". There was some controversy over the names on the stone, and at first it was thought to be the sepulchre of Wledermat Odeleu, but it has come to be accepted that it is the grave of Wleder, mother (matris) of Odeleu. Owain ap Gruffudd was king of Gwynedd from 1137 to 1170, so the stone gives an approximate date for the first church. Over the years the church was altered several times. At one time a small gallery was reserved for "gentlefolk". In 1871 the church was rebuilt, and around 1883 the vestry was added.

Mary Evans (Mari y fantell wen) (1735–89), leader of a sect that claimed she was the bride of Christ, is buried in the graveyard of the church. Many seamen and ship's captains are buried there. Other graves include those of Lewis Holland Thomas, who started as a seafarer and made his fortune as a trader; the author Ann Harriet Hughes (Gwyneth Vaughan, 1852–1910); the diplomat David Ormsby-Gore, 5th Baron Harlech (1918–85); and the author Richard Hughes (1900–76). Hughes spent holidays near Talsarnau as a child and lived near Talsarnau from 1947 until his death. He was churchwarden of Llanfihangel-y-traethau.

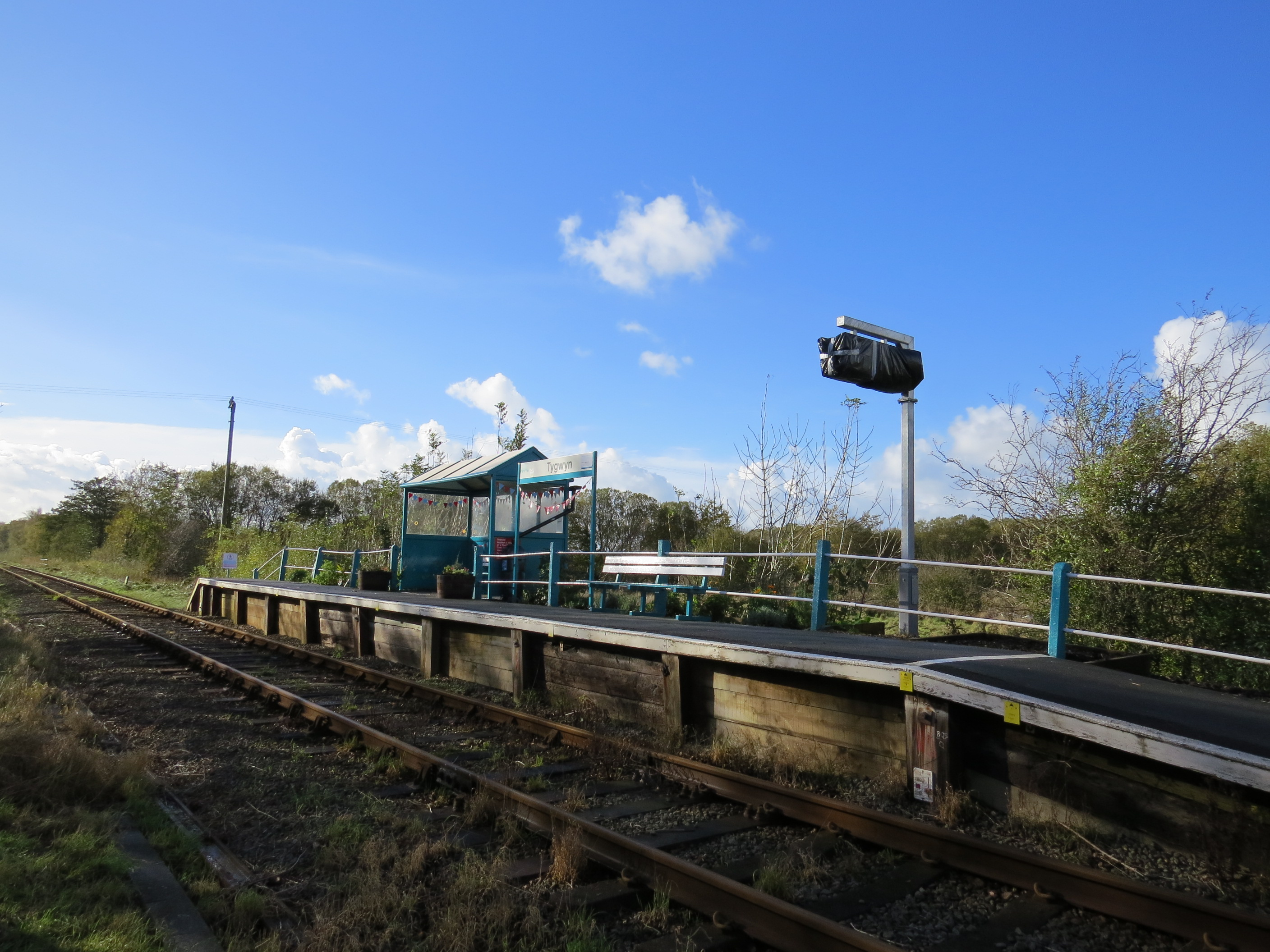
Tygwyn railway station which serves the village, an unstaffed halt on the Cambrian Line

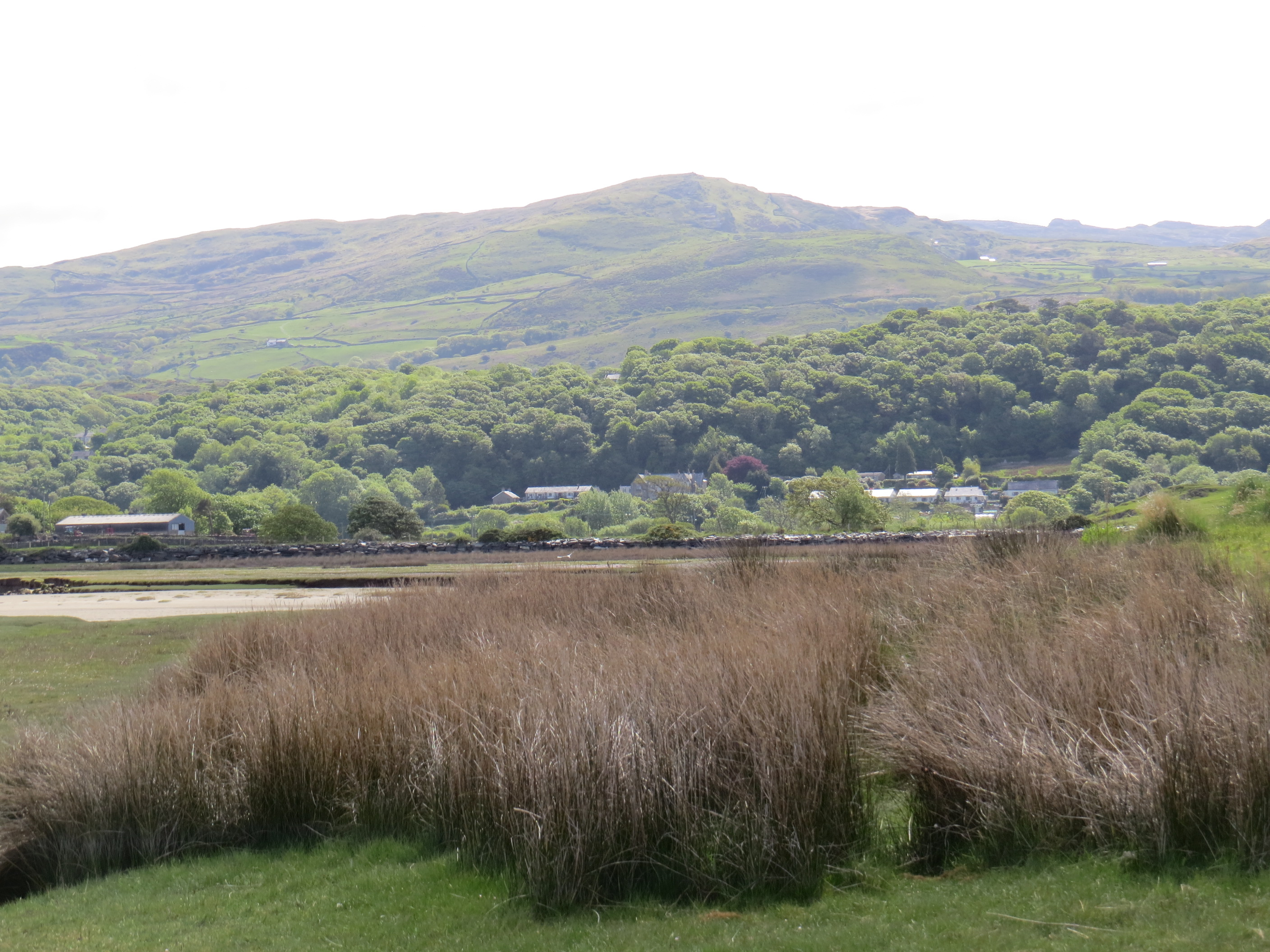
Looking east towards the Rhinogs

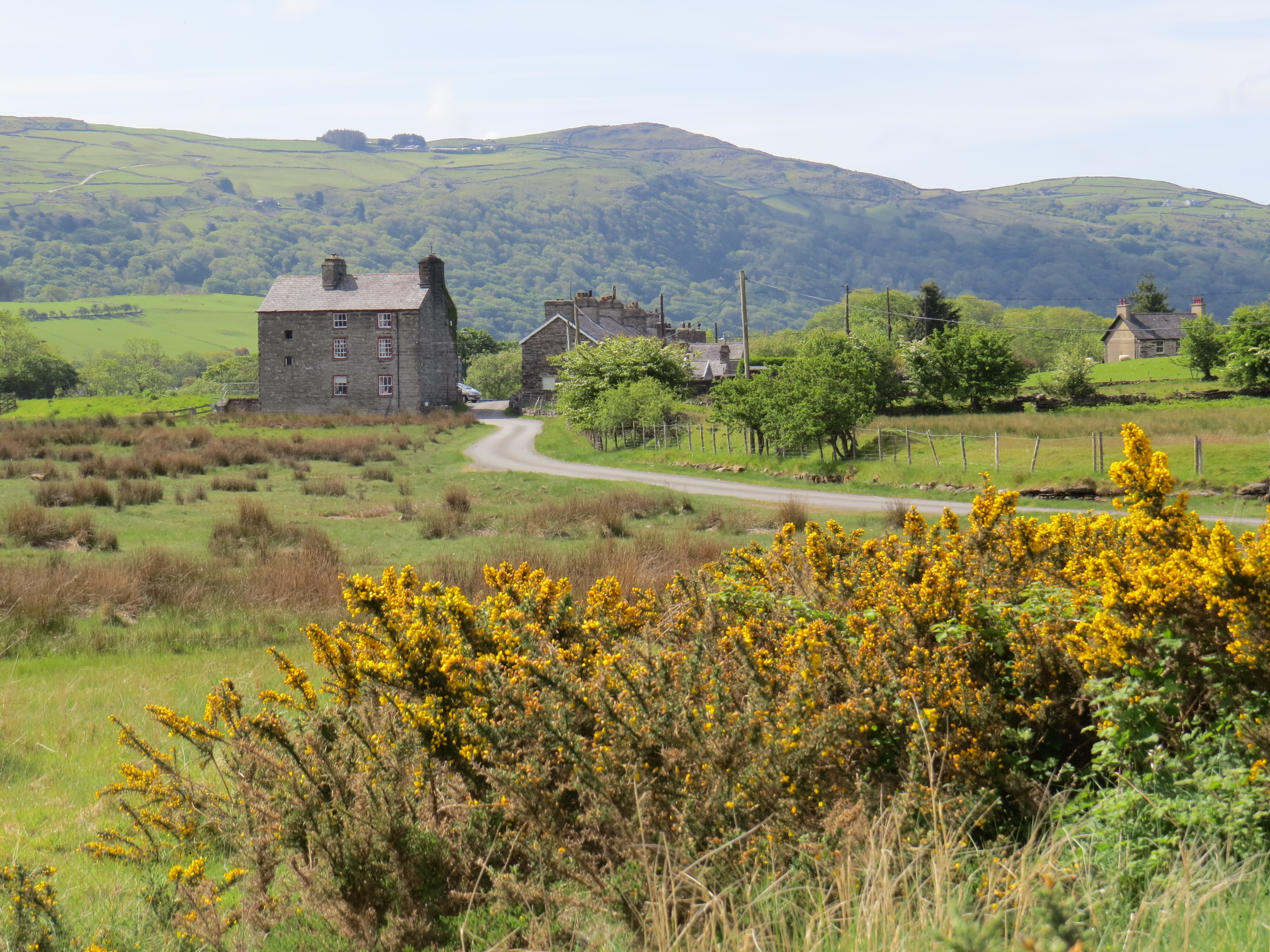
A rare example of a tidal mill

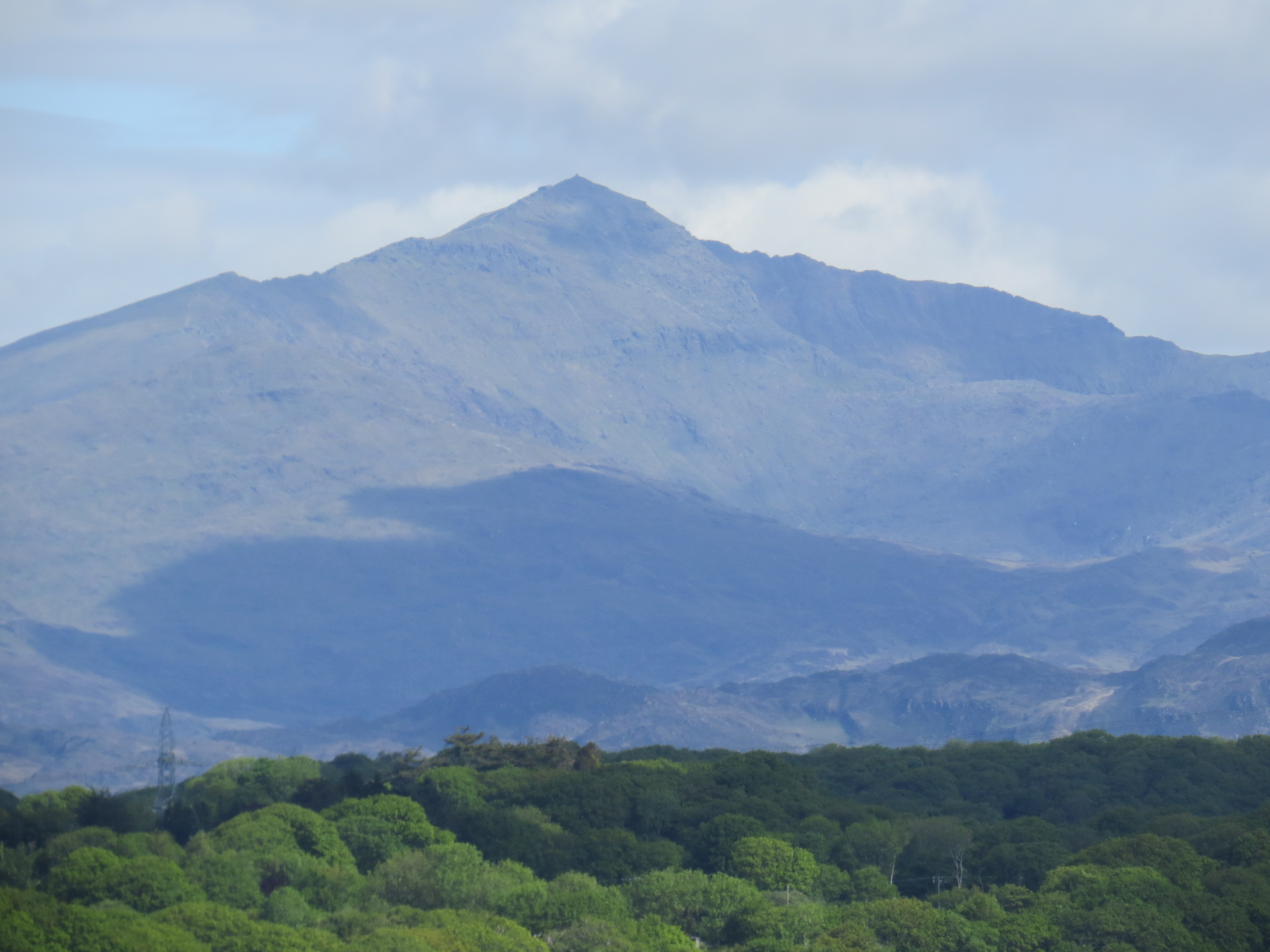
The mountains of Snowdonia to the north-east

== Sources ==
- Bathurst, William L. (1859), "No. 903—For constituting the District of Penrhyn out of the parishes of Llanfihangel-y-Traethau, Llandecwyn, and Llanfrothen, in the county of Merioneth and in the diocese of Bangor", Reports from Commissioners
- Bell, James (1835), A new and comprehensive gazetteer of England and Wales, illustr. by a series of maps. 4 vols. [in 2].
- Commissioners on The Public Records (1837), General Report to The King in Council from the Honourable Board of Commissioners on The Public Records
- Hughes, Robert (30 October 2007), The Parish Church Llanfihangel-y-Traethau Ynys (PDF), archived from the original (PDF) on 10 April 2016
- Jenkins, Robert Thomas (1959), "EVANS, MARY", Dictionary of Welsh Biography, National Library of Wales
- Jones, Mathew John (2016), Old Gravestone at Llanfihangel y Traethau, Gwefan Gymunedol Talsarnau
- "Llanfihangel-y-Traethau", National Gazetteer of Great Britain and Ireland, 1868
- Pearson, Lynn F. (2004), Discovering Famous Graves, Osprey Publishing, ISBN 978-0-7478-0619-6
- Ross, David (2016), "Llanfihangel-y-Traethau Carved Stone", Britain Express
- Westwood, John Obadiah (1879), Lapidarium Walliæ: the early inscribed and sculptured stones of Wales, delineated and described
- Williams, Robert (1852), Enwogion Cymru: A Biographical Dictionary of Eminent Welshmen, from the Earliest Times to the Present, and Including Every Name Connected with the Ancient History of Wales, W. Rees
- Wilson, John Marius (1870–1872), "Llanfihangel Y Traethau Merionethshire", Imperial Gazetteer of England and Wales Republished by University of Portsmouth as "History of Llanfihangel Y Traethau, in Gwynedd and Merionethshire" in A Vision of Britain through Time
- Wright, George Newenham (1837), A New and Comprehensive Gazetteer, T. Kelly
