= Soar, Gwynedd =

Coordinates: 52.898°N 4.058°W

Soar
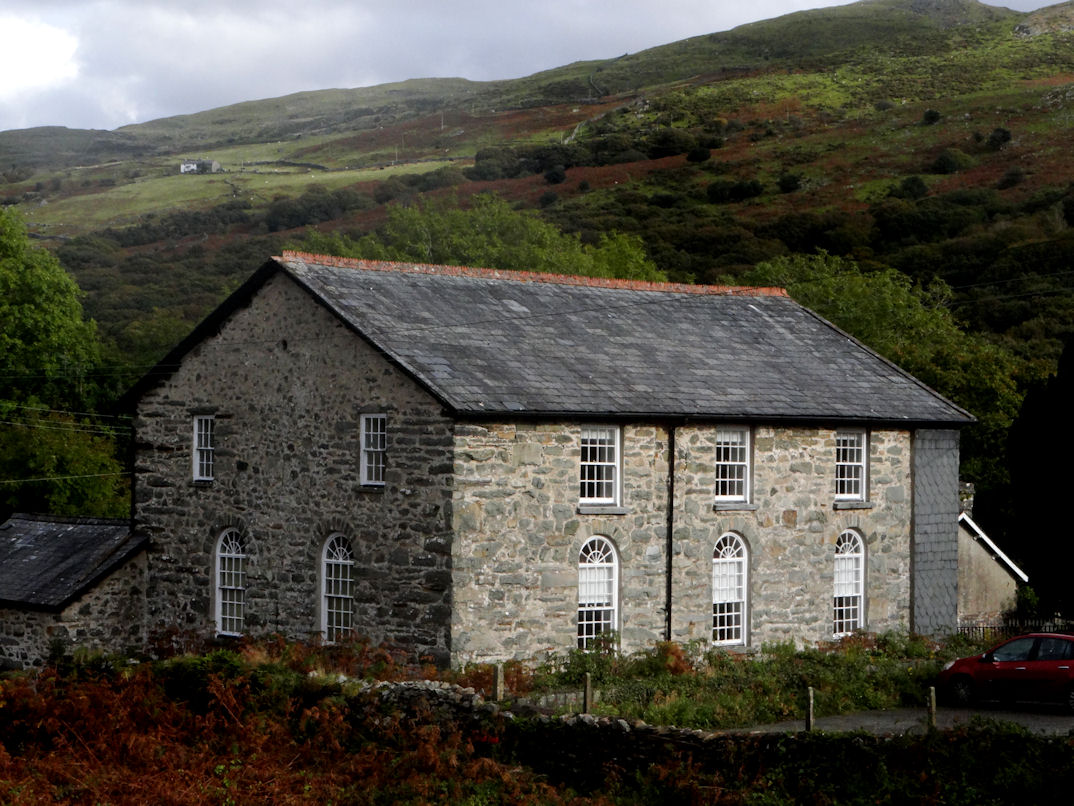
- Soar Chapel

- Location within Gwynedd
- OS grid reference: SH615354
- Community: Talsarnau
- Principal area: Gwynedd
- Country: Wales
- Sovereign state: United Kingdom
- Post town: TALSARNAU
- Postcode district: LL47
- Dialling code: 01766
- Police: North Wales
- Fire: North Wales
- Ambulance: Welsh
- UK Parliament: Dwyfor Meirionnydd
- Senedd Cymru – Welsh Parliament: Dwyfor Meirionnydd

Soar is a small village or hamlet in Gwynedd, Wales.

It is located about 4 miles (6.4 km) northeast of Harlech, close to Talsarnau and Llandecwyn.

It has no school; children in the hamlet go to school in Talsarnau.
