= Ann Harriet Hughes =

Welsh novelist

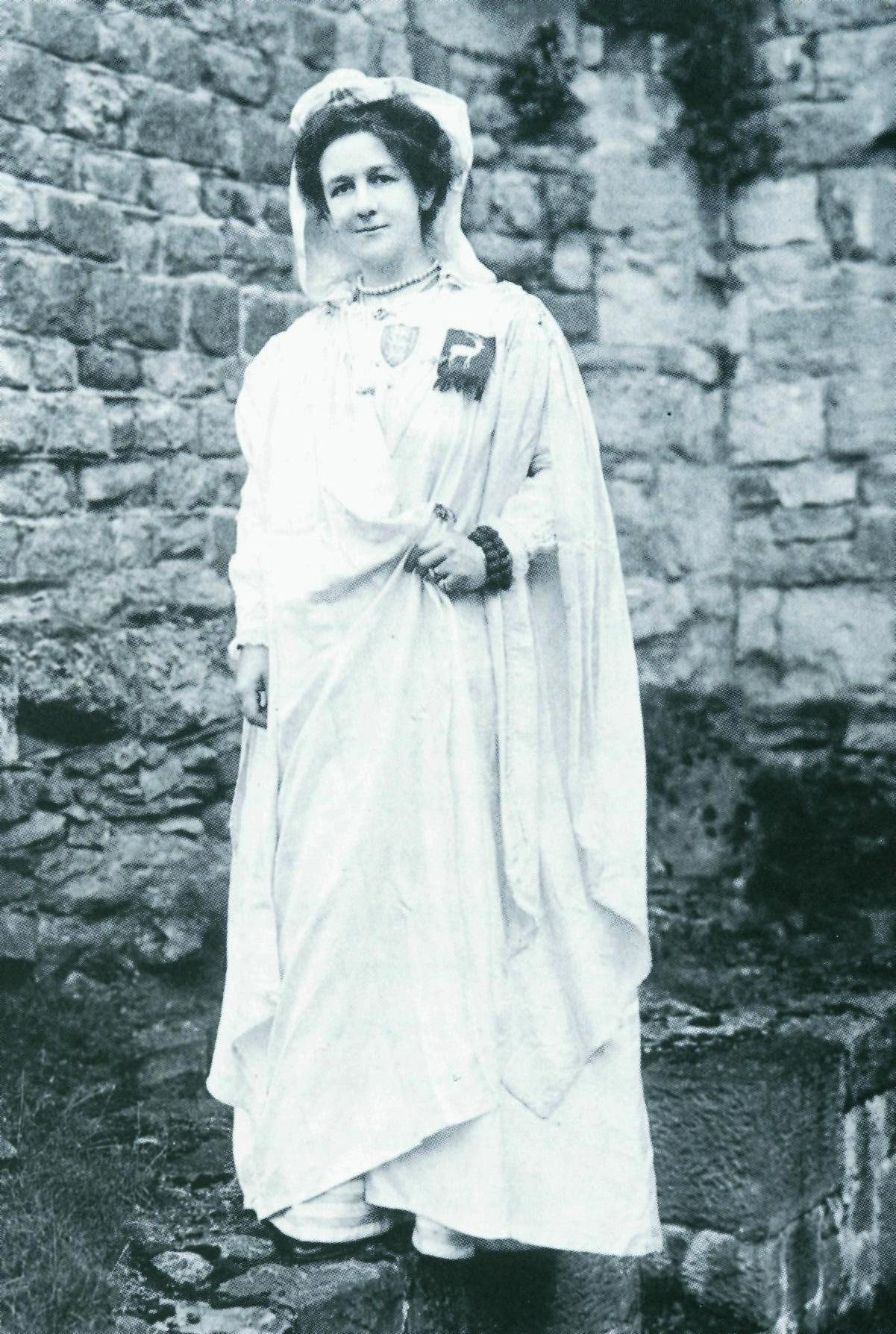
- Vaughan in "bardic" costume in 1904
- Born: Talsarnau, Merionethshire, Wales
- Other name: Gwyneth Vaughan
- Occupations: Welsh language novelist, poet, newspaper editor and supporter of temperance and women's suffrage

Annie Harriet Hughes (née Jones, 1852 – 25 April 1910) was a Welsh language novelist, poet, and newspaper editor, who wrote and published three novels between 1905 and 1908, under the pen-name Gwyneth Vaughan. She was also a supporter of the temperance and women's suffrage movements.

== Early life ==
Ann Harriet Hughes was born at Talsarnau in Merionethshire, the daughter of miller Bennet Jones, and had a basic school education at Llandecwyn. In 1876 she married John Hughes Jones, a doctor in Clwt-y-bont, Caernarvon; but later dropped the "Jones" part of her surname. Ann lived in London and later in Treherbert and Clwt-y-bont. Left to bring up four children on her husband's death in 1902, she moved to Bangor, Gwynedd, and took up writing as a career.

== Career ==
Hughes completed three novels, and left a fourth unfinished work. She also edited Welsh versions of three of the works of the Scottish evangelist Henry Drummond and wrote verse in Welsh. She edited the woman's page in the Welsh Weekly (1892), Yr Eryr (1894–95) Y Cymro (1906–07).

Hughes was also a supporter of the temperance, women's suffrage and Cymru Fydd movements, writing in 1897 that:

"...it is with glad heart that I feel that the men of my own land are in the vanguard of reform, with a very few exceptions, and those we need not worry about. The men of Wales encourage their mothers, wives, sisters, and daughters in their highest aspirations, after the noble, the true, and the beautiful, and rejoice with them in all their achievements. We have John Bull as usual lagging behind in his own thick-headed fashion, but are we not justified by the histories of other movements in hoping that where – ‘The vanguard camps to-day, / The rear will camp tomorrow"

— Women and Their Questions, Young Wales (1897)

== Death ==
Ann Harriet Hughes died on 25 April 1910 at Pwllheli, Gwynedd, in her late fifties. She was buried in the graveyard of the Llanfihangel-y-traethau church. In 1911, her son Arthur Hughes emigrated to Patagonia.

== Works ==
- O Gorlannau'r Defaid (1905)
- Plant y Gorthrwm (1908)
- Cysgodau y Blynyddoedd Gynt (1908)
- Troad y Rhod (unfinished; partly published in the periodical Y Brython, 1909).

== Sources ==
- Hughes, Robert (30 October 2007), The Parish Church Llanfihangel-y-Traethau Ynys (PDF), archived from the original (PDF) on 10 April 2016
- Williams, Richard Bryn (1959), "HUGHES, ANNIE HARRIET", Dictionary of Welsh Biography, National Library of Wales
