= Women's suffrage in Wales =

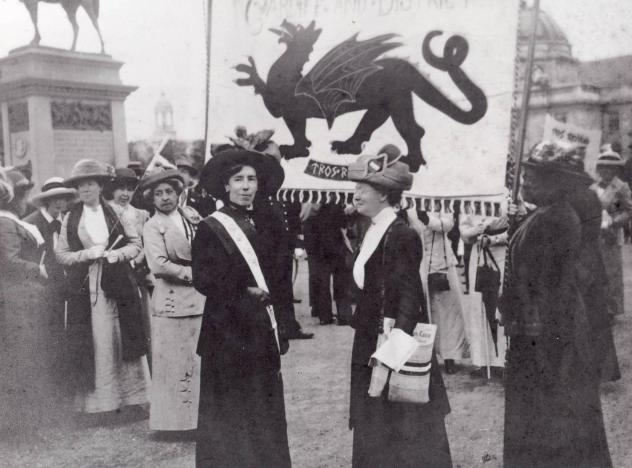
Suffragettes from the Cardiff and District Women's Suffrage Society, including leader Rose Mabel Lewis (front left), at a rally in Cathays Park in 1913

Women's suffrage in Wales has historically been marginalised due to the prominence of societies and political groups in England which led the reform for women throughout the United Kingdom. Due to differing social structures and a heavily industrialised working-class society, the growth of a national movement in Wales grew but then stuttered in the late nineteenth century in comparison with that of England. Nevertheless, distinct Welsh groups and individuals rose to prominence and were vocal in the rise of suffrage in Wales and the rest of Great Britain.

In the early twentieth century, Welsh hopes of advancing the cause of female suffrage centred around the Liberal Party and the Chancellor of the Exchequer, David Lloyd George, one of the most important Welsh politicians of the day. After Liberal success in the 1906 Election failed to materialise into political change, suffragettes and in particular members of the more militant Women's Social and Political Union (WSPU), took a hard-line stance towards their Members of Parliament, engaging in direct action against them.

Militant action was not a hallmark of the movements in Wales and Welsh members, who more often identified themselves as suffragists, sought Parliamentary and public support through political and peaceful means. In 1918, across the United Kingdom, women over the age of 30 gained the right to vote, followed by the Representation of the People (Equal Franchise) Act 1928 which saw women gain the same rights to vote as men.

== The history of women's suffrage in Wales ==
=== Early women's suffrage in Wales, 1832–1884 ===
Women were not explicitly banned from voting in Great Britain until the Reform Act 1832 (2 & 3 Will. 4. c. 45) and the Municipal Corporations Act 1835. In England the suffrage movement existed before and after the 1832 act, but did not form a national organisation until the creation of the National Society for Women's Suffrage in 1872. Although there were notable exceptions such as the working-class areas of Lancashire, the women's suffrage movement in England was predominantly a middle-class movement. In Wales there were only two narrow bands of wealthy society in the Anglicised north and south coastal areas. Much of the female population of an emerging 19th century Wales was based in the low-waged, densely populated, industrialised valleys of the south. At first women found work in metalworking and coal extraction, but then faced mass unemployment after the Mines and Collieries Act 1842 had prohibited them from working underground. The coal mining industry, with its absence of pithead baths, led to unpaid women's employment as the need to keep both their homes and the family's menfolk clean became a never ending task. This led to the image of the stoic Welsh Mam, a matriarch of the home, but little could be further from the truth in a society controlled by men.

The increase of wealth created by the mining and metalworking industries saw the creation of new upper-class families who often built their wealthy homes in the centre of the community from which they prospered. Whereas the pit and foundry owners were initially men, many of whom had political ambitions, their wives sought more charitable activities often connected to improving the lives of the women and children of their husband's workers. In Dowlais, the heart of the ironworking industry of Wales, Rose Mary Crawshay, the well-to-do English-born wife of Robert Thompson Crawshay, passed her time in such charitable work. She set up soup kitchens, gave to the poor and established no less than seven libraries in the area, but apart from this work, for which she would be expected to do, she was also a staunch feminist. Living under the rule of a notoriously tyrannical husband, for whom she bore five children, she showed a strong-will and was known in feminist circles in London from the 1850s. In 1866 she and 25 other signatories, all based in Wales, signed the country's first women's Suffrage Petition. (Note: Amongst the signatories were three from Merthyr, eight from Denbigh and ten from the Swansea area.)

In June 1870, Rose Crawshay held a public meeting at her home, probably the first in Wales to discuss women's suffrage, but she was later taken to task by the local newspaper for disturbing the peace and leading Wales' women astray. The first suffrage tour of Welsh towns was conducted the following year by Jessie Craigen, who travelled the south of the country visiting Pontypool, Pembroke Dock, Neyland, Saundersfoot and Newport. On 4 March 1872, Mrs. Crawshay held a second meeting, in Merthyr Tydfill, which resulted in a new petition being delivered, the effect of which saw the signing of petitions from Glamorgan, Monmouthshire, Denbighshire and Cardiganshire. Later that year the Bristol & West of England Society for Women's Suffrage sent two of their members, Caroline Biggs and Lilias Ashworth, on a sponsored speaking tour of south Wales which took in Pontypool, Newport, Cardiff and Haverfordwest. Despite the actions of several prominent Welsh women, such as Lady Amberley and Miss Gertrude Jenner of Wenvoe, no real suffrage movements took hold in the 1870s and the country was reliant on speaking tours from members of English societies, predominantly from Bristol, London and Manchester.

On 25 February 1881, Gertrude Jenner addressed a meeting held in Cardiff Town Hall to "consider means of promoting interest in Cardiff" towards female voting rights. This was a preliminary to a larger meeting that was held on 9 March which was attended by local dignitaries, Miss Jenner, Helen Blackburn and was chaired by the Mayor of Cardiff. Despite there being a great deal of suffrage activity in the lead up to the Representation of the People Act 1884 (the 'Third Reform Act'), there was little campaigning in Wales during the early 1880s. One act of significant importance that did occur during this period was the decision in late 1884 by the delegates of the Aberdare, Merthyr and Dowlais District Mine Association to support a series of talks by Jeanette Wilkinson on the right of women's votes. This is the first recorded instance of interest by Welsh working men supporting female suffrage.

=== Suffragist societies in Wales, 1884–1906 ===
Map of Wales showing the locations of NUWSS branches as listed in the Suffrage Annual of Women's Who's Who (1913). (Note: In her article Beddoe argues that the list shown in the Suffrage Annual of Women's Who's Who of 1913 may be incomplete, as it was known that during this period there were active branches of the NUWSS in both Aberdare and Neath, though neither are listed. Also the branch 'Farmer's District' is not marked as no corresponding location has been given)

The publication of the Representation of the People Act 1867 and the Representation of the People Act 1884, both of which extended suffrage for men in the United Kingdom, led to large-scale political organisation. These combined with the outcome of the Corrupt and Illegal Practices Prevention Act 1883, which prevented the payment of canvassers, led to both Conservative and Liberal Parties approaching female supporters to aid them in political campaigning. The Conservatives were first to offer a political role for women in Wales with the opening of branches of the Primrose League, but campaigning for women's rights was not its priority and merely aimed to 'interest women in politics'.

In response the Liberal Party launched Women's Liberal Associations which allowed women more freedom to allocate a role and voice for themselves and were not a mere subsidiary of the national party. The organisation of women in the Liberal Party in Wales began around 1890 supported by prominent members Gwyneth Vaughan, Nora Phillips and Sybil Thomas. In 1891 an Aberdare branch of the Women's Liberal Foundation was founded and it quickly began advocating votes for women and began leafleting in both English and Welsh. By 1893 there were said to be 7,000 members of the Welsh Union of Women's Liberal Associations which had raised to 9,000 by 1895. At a meeting of the North Wales Liberal Foundation in 1895 it was decided that Women's Liberal Federation would merge with Cymru Fydd, a political pressure group for home rule, to form a new Welsh Liberal Federation and equal rights for women were written into the objects of the organisation. Despite some early successes Liberal organisation floundered as they headed into the new century and apart from the Cardiff branch which achieved some successes, many of the branches had closed by 1907.

=== Pressure groups ===
1897 saw the foundation of the National Union of Women's Suffrage Societies (NUWSS) under the leadership of Millicent Fawcett. This was a non-political organisation which was formed out of the seventeen strongest societies throughout England. It took until 1907 before the first branch of the NUWSS was formed in Wales. This occurred during a meeting at the Llandudno Cocoa House which saw Mrs. Walton-Evans become the president of the local cell. Other branches soon began forming across Wales, with the creation of the Cardiff and District branch in 1908 followed by Rhyl, Conwy and Bangor in 1909.

The more militant arm of the suffrage movement, the Women's Social and Political Union (WSPU), was not strong in Wales. In 1913 it had five branches in Wales compared to 26 for the NUWSS. That said the WSPU had been active in promoting itself in Wales long before this with Emmeline Pankhurst and Mary Gawthorpe holding meetings throughout Wales in 1906. In 1908 both the WSPU and the NUWSS were active in Pembrokeshire to campaign at a by-election. Their slogan of 'Keep the Liberals Out', would not have resonated with the Welsh voters, as in the election of 1906 not a single Tory had won a seat in Wales. Nonetheless, their main political target was Liberal prime minister H. H. Asquith who was vehemently opposed to the enfranchisement of women.

=== David Lloyd George and the suffrage movement, 1907–1912 ===
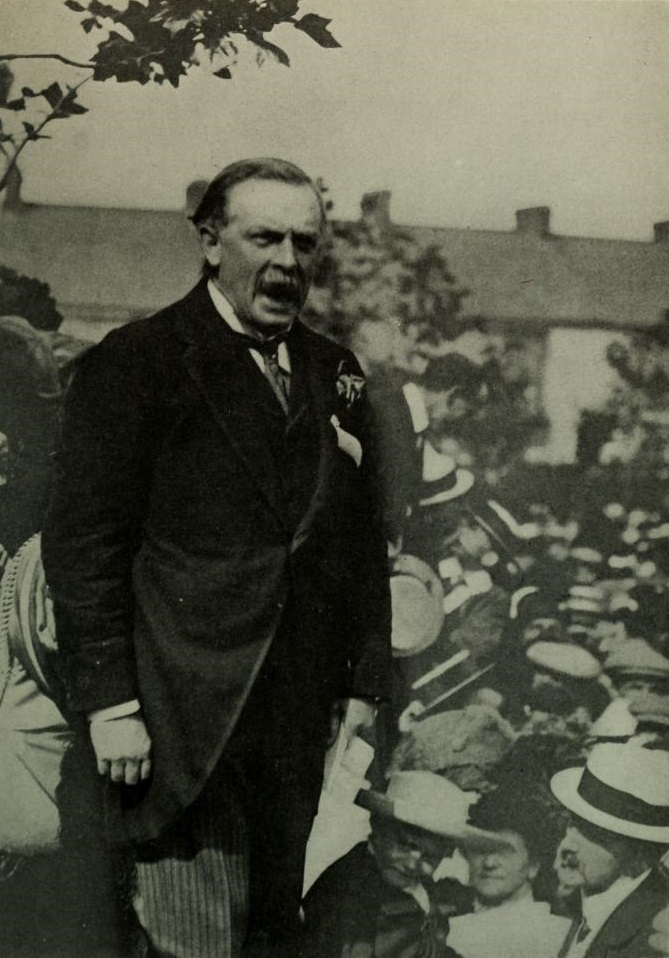
David Lloyd George in 1912, during the height of the WSPU militancy action.

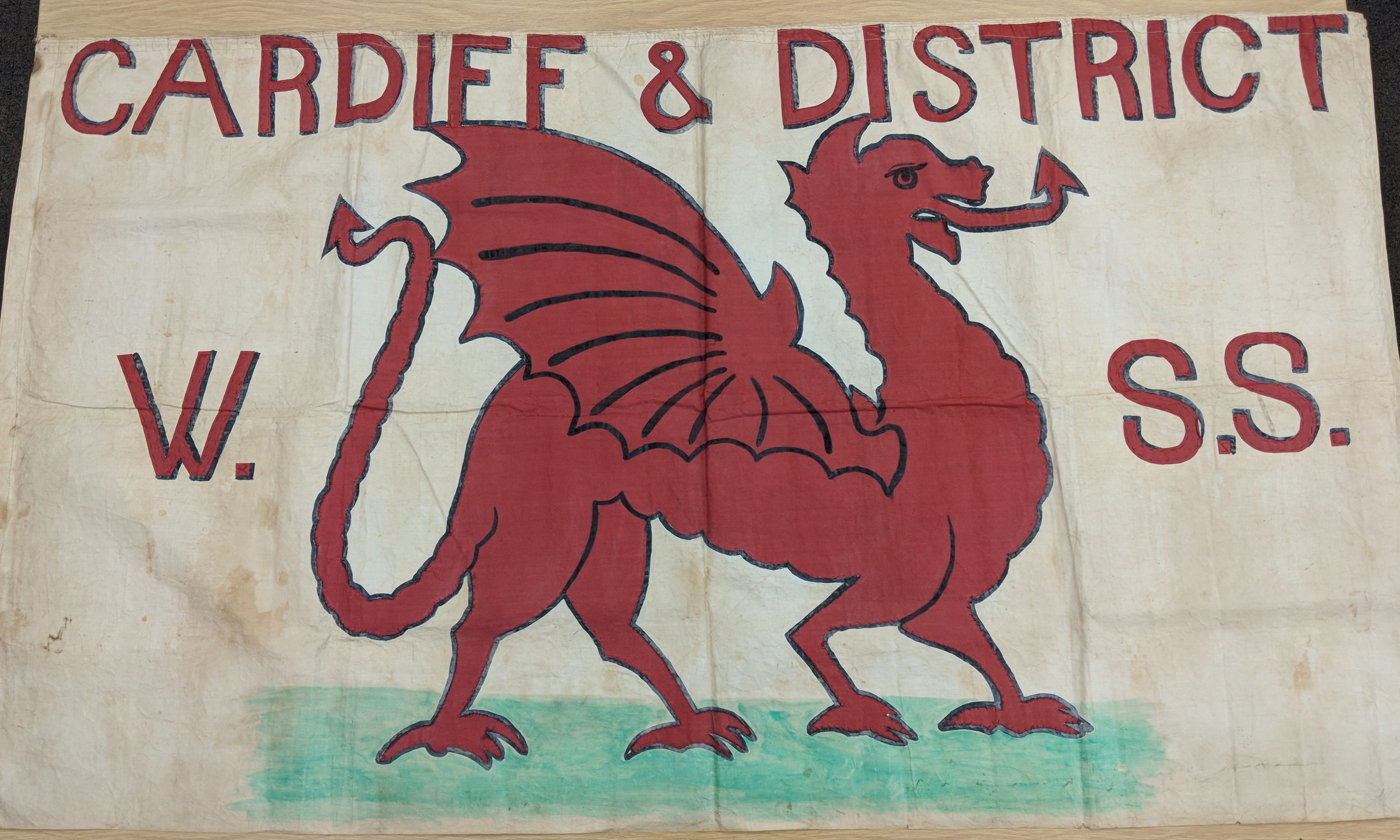
1908 banner of the Cardiff & District Women's Suffrage Society

Attitudes towards the suffragette movement as a whole were badly affected by militant actions led mostly by members of the WSPU. In July 1908 the Women's National Anti-Suffrage League (WNASL) was inaugurated, with Welsh MP Ivor Guest serving as treasurer. The initial involvement of Ermine Taylor led to a branch of the WNASL being formed in Denbigshire the following year. Undeterred the pro-suffrage groups continued to take direct action. In Bristol in 1908, Winston Churchill had been threatened by WSPU members, and the widespread anger after the event led to a Cardiff meeting led by Charlotte Despard being abandoned. In Merthyr the speakers were drowned out and herrings and tomatoes thrown at them. Despite being a 'favoured son of Wales' and outwardly pro-women's suffrage, Liberal MP, and from 1908, the Chancellor of the Exchequer, David Lloyd George was often a target of suffragette activity. Although Lloyd George always stated his support to the suffrage movement in public speeches, the failure of the Liberal Government to make any progress on implementing change led Christabel Pankhurst to believe him to be a secret anti-suffragist. Pankhurst was quoted in the Times in November 1911 declaring "'Lloyd Georgitis' seemed to be a disease which afflicted men to-day with very few exceptions. But women saw through him. They had always known him as an anti-suffragist, and they must fight him here and now." Pankhurst's assumptions had a basis of truth, as a month before Lloyd George had written to the Liberal Party chief whip bemoaning the fact that the forthcoming Conciliation Bill would hand hundreds of thousands of votes to the Tory party.

The year 1912 saw a marked increase in militant action in Wales. Anger at the defeat of the Conciliation Bills saw the WPSU disrupt a speech by Lloyd George at the Pavilion in Caernarfon. The protesters, male and female, were treated harshly with clothes torn and hair ripped out and were beaten by sticks and umbrellas. Later that year Lloyd George was again heckled by suffragettes whilst delivering a speech at the National Eisteddfod. Just two weeks later one of the most notorious events in the history of suffrage in Wales took place, when Lloyd George returned to his home town of Llanystumdwy to open the village hall. No sooner had he started speaking than he was interrupted by the cries of 'Votes for Women!' The hecklers were violently assaulted by the crowd. One was stripped to the waist before being rescued and another was almost thrown off a bridge to be dashed on the rocks of the River Dwyfor below. As trouble was anticipated the national press was present and the Daily Mirror and Illustrated London News devoted a full page of photographs to the incident. The local press not only attacked the suffragettes, but poured scorn on the crowd for tarnishing the image of a peaceful, Nonconformist, chapel-going Wales. The event is seen as the most dramatic event in the history of Women's suffrage in Wales.

=== March to Victory, 1912–1918 ===
As the 1910s unfolded, attitudes hardened on both sides of the emancipation issue. In 1912 the anti-suffrage WNASL was amalgamated into the newly formed National League for Opposing Woman Suffrage (NLOWS), and that year a branch of the NLOWS was established in Bangor. Of the 286 branches of the organisation, 19 were eventually formed in Wales. Two of the most prolific supporters of the NLOWS in Wales were both Members of Parliament; Ivor Guest (Cardiff) and J. D. Rees (Montgomery).

In the years leading up to the outbreak of the First World War the NUWSS spent its time in north Wales organising educational and propaganda campaigns. In south Wales friction was caused by a shift in political views pushed onto the country from the central office. 1912 saw the NUWSS switch its policy as a non-party organisation to set up the Election Fighting Fund (EFF) to support the newly burgeoning Labour Party. Wales had traditionally been a Liberal heartland and the South Wales Federation of Women's Suffrage Societies was opposed to this new policy. There was a sense that there was a disjoint between the central 'English feminist agenda' pushed by the militant headquarters and the needs of Welsh social, cultural and political views. The strains existed between the two organisation until the EFF was abandoned in 1914.

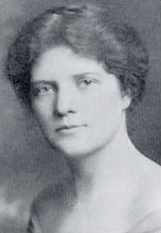
Margaret Haig Mackworth, later Viscountess Rhondda, Welsh militant suffragette.

In 1913 a Suffrage Pilgrimage was organised, to end with a rally in Hyde Park, London on 26 July. It was an attempt to remind the public of the larger constitutional and non-militant wing of the movement, and routes were planned from 17 British towns and cities, including Wales. Twenty-eight members from Welsh NUWSS branches left from Bangor on 2 July travelling through Wales where they were met with both support and hostility. A further branch left Cardiff on 7 July.

1913 also saw a continuation of more hard-line methods, with the WPSU firebombing a house which was being built for Lloyd George. Between April and September 1913, hoax bombs were set at both Cardiff and Abergavenny, and at Llantarnam, telegraph wires were cut. This period also saw the actions of one of Wales' most notable suffragettes, Margaret Haig Mackworth, daughter of MP D. A. Thomas and his activist wife Sybil Thomas. Mackworth had been recruited into the WPSU in 1908 and had been a vocal and active member from that date, later founding the Newport branch of the organisation. In 1913 she was convicted of setting fire to a post box and after refusing to pay the fine was sent to prison at Usk. While imprisoned Mackworth went on hunger strike, but was released under the 'Cat and Mouse Act'.

By 1914 the non-militant elements of the suffrage movement had built up a steady presence and, although damaged by the bad press violent action brought, they also gained from the publicity. A summer school had been set up by the NUWSS in the Conwy Valley the previous year and now their members were benefitting from the training in public speaking that was given. In south Wales signs of working-class involvement in the suffrage cause took shape through the Women's Co-operative Guild, with a branch opening in Ton Pentre in the Rhondda in 1914 run by Elizabeth Andrews.

With the outbreak of the First World War, all WSPU activity came to a halt and the NUWSS turned much of their focus to relief work. The WPSU, reformed as the Women's Party from 1917, sent members across Wales, no longer to rally for suffrage but to encourage male volunteers to join the British Army. In 1915 Flora Drummond attended a rally in Merthyr to demand that men leave occupations that women could undertake, and to stop 'hiding behind the petticoats'. Women in Wales took up employment en masse, especially in newly opened munitions factories, and in 1918 the Newport Shell Factory had a female workforce of 83 per cent while the Queensferry factory was 70 per cent.

The militant suffragettes, who were at one point public enemies, were now seen as fierce nationalist and patriots. Old foes became allies and vice versa. Lloyd George was now referred to as 'that great Welshman' while Labours' Keir Hardie, the WSPU's staunchest defender before the war, was lambasted for his pacifist stance. There were still those in the suffragette movement who wished to keep pushing the agenda of emancipation. Some members of the WSPU broke away to form the Suffragettes of the WSPU (SWSPU), amongst their members were Conwy-born Helena Jones, who continued to campaign for women's votes, challenging Pankhurst's stance publicly in the letter pages of the Suffragists News Sheet. (Note: Writing in the letter pages of the Suffragist News Sheet in September 1916, Jones proclaimed "NOW is the psychological moment for demanding the admission of women to the franchise [because] the political machine during the war may be likened to sealing wax to which heat has been applied: it is in a condition to receive new impressions […] After the war it will harden again, and the old difficulties with party shibboleths will be revived.)

The Representation of the People Act 1918 was passed which gave women over the age of 30, who met a property qualification, the right to vote. Several factors led to the passing of the act, including the efforts of working women, the dilution of anti-suffrage rhetoric and political change in London, where Asquith had been replaced as prime minister by Lloyd George. The government believed that six million voters would be added by the 1918 act, in Wales the electorate rose from 430,000 to 1,172,000.

=== After the Representation of the People Act 1918 ===
During the First World War, relief work helped keep the women's societies in Wales active, though membership numbers began to fall. After the Representation of the People Act 1918, many of the regional branches began to wither. The Llangollen WSS resolved to disband in December 1918, handing their marching banner to the National Council, believing their work was done. While others, such as the Newport branch, revised their aims to form a Women's Citizen Association taking an active interest in welfare and social issues. Other branches continued the political vision of equal suffrage, notably Bangor, while the Cardiff WSS busied itself by attempting to secure the election of women to local government posts. The fact that the terms of enfranchisement were not equal to men ensured that the surviving suffragist societies still had a focus, and the first point of order was the bill to admit women as MPs. This was passed in October 1918 and seventeen women stood at the 1918 General Election. There was one female candidacy in Wales, Millicent Mackenzie, a former professor of education from the University College of South Wales and Monmouthshire, who unsuccessfully contested the newly formed University of Wales seat. It took until 1929 for Wales to return its first female MP, Megan Lloyd George, the youngest daughter of the former prime minister.

In 1921 Margaret Mackworth, now the second Viscountess Rhondda, launched the Six Point Group, an action group that focused heavily on the equality between men and women and the rights of the child. Mackworth continued to strive towards equality for women and emerged as one of the leading feminist campaigners in Britain during the inter-war period. She established a number of women's organisations, pressure groups and launched the influential feminist journal Time and Tide. She also made an unsuccessful bid to gain entry into the House of Lords, fighting against a 1922 ruling that barred the admission of women.

Equal franchise was eventually won with the passing of the Representation of the People Act 1928. This was not achieved through a matter of course, but through a constant campaign of organised pressure. The NUWSS reorganised into the National Union of Societies for Equal Citizenship (NUSEC), taking on a broader range of issues to secure more widespread support. The Women's Freedom League (WFL), which was formed in 1907 out of schism caused by Emmeline Pankhurst's desire for a more authoritarian style of leadership within the WSPU, was a vocal advocate of equal rights throughout the 1920s. In 1919 there were four WFL branches in Wales, and, although the Aberdyfi and Cardiff branches had disbanded by 1921, both Montgomery Boroughs and Swansea remained staunchly active throughout the decade.

== Suffragists versus militancy ==
The women's suffrage movement in Wales has historically been held in poor regard with little research undertaken before the end of the twentieth century. Initial impressions of women's voting rights in the country can appear to suggest apathy or even hostility towards suffrage, but historians such as Kay Cook and Neil Evans writing in 1991, and built upon by Dr. Kirsti Bohata, argue specific cultural environments led to a more cautious and considered political ideology. The type of militancy advocated by Emmeline Pankhurst's Women's Social and Political Union appears to have been rejected by the majority of Welsh suffrage campaigners, especially in the north of Wales, but Cook claims that the origin of this lies in the 1847 governmental "Reports of the Commissioners of Inquiry into the state of education in Wales", commonly known in Wales as the Treason of the Blue Books.

...ein cylch ni yw derchafiad y Rhyw fenywaidd ymhob ystyr, - yn gymdeithasolm moesol a chrefyddol. Ein hamcan yw cydweithredu a sefydliadau addysgiadol ein hoes er cynhyrchu morwynion ffyddlon, marched rhinweddol, gwragedd darbodus a mamau deallgar...

...our interest is the elevation of the female sex in every respect - social, moral and religious. Our intention is to co-operate with the educational establishments of our time to produce faithful maids, virtuous women, thrifty wives and intelligent mothers...

— excerpt from the introductory address by Evan Jones ("Ieuan Gwynedd") the editor of Y Gymraes (the Welshwoman)

In 1846, after a parliamentary speech by radical MP William Williams, concerns were raised regarding the level of education in Wales. This resulted in an inquiry carried out by three English commissioners appointed by the Privy Council, none of whom had any knowledge of the Welsh language, Nonconformity or elementary education. The findings of the report were immensely detailed and were damning towards not only the state of education in Wales but drew a very critical picture of the Welsh as a people, labelling them as immoral and backwards. Within its pages Welsh women were labelled as licentious and "cut off from civilising influences by the impenetrable Welsh language". The report drew questions over the chastity of the poor and was just as damning to the wealthier women of the country; claiming that English farmers’ daughters were respectable; while their Welsh counterparts Wales were in the "constant habit of being courted in bed". The result of the report led to a concerted effort to ensure that Welsh women would in future be above rebuke, and several Welsh periodicals were launched in the decades following aimed at improving housekeeping and to improve the morality of the Welsh readership.

One of the first periodicals to launch after the publication, and in direct response to, the 'Blue Books' was Y Gymraes (The Welshwoman). Its editor Evan Jones (1820-1852) known by his bardic name of "Ieaun Gwynedd" was seen as a champion of Welsh women following his detailed defence of their morality following the controversy surrounding the Report. Y Gymraes, launched in January 1850, set out to create the 'perfect' Welshwoman, a virtue of morality, sobriety and thrift, a beacon that would see the Welsh nation above all future criticism. As early as the autumn of 1851, with the health of its editor failing, Y Gymraes was merged with the monthly penny periodical Y Tywysydd (The Guide), and became Y Tywysydd a'r Gymraes in early 1852. Despite its title the majority of the contributors were men, and the publication continued to emphasise the importance of high moral standards rather than give practical advice. Although the publication continued into the 1880s, it eventually made way for Y Frythones (The Female Briton) under the editorship of Sarah Jane Rees. Although these periodicals had their roots in the temperance movement, and many of the articles within their pages were frivolous, by the 1880s they began broaching the topic of female emancipation.

Jane Aaron in 1994 described how the desire for Welsh womanhood to be seen as respectable in the eyes of its "colonial" neighbour endured even when their English counterparts had decided to take up an aggressive or 'unwomanly' mantle to achieve their goals of female emancipation. Bohata builds on this hypothesis stating that the "idealised Welsh woman, inspired by England’s middle-class angel of the house, would represent Welsh respectability long after English women had abandoned their haloes in favour of bicycles."

== How Welsh was Welsh suffrage ==
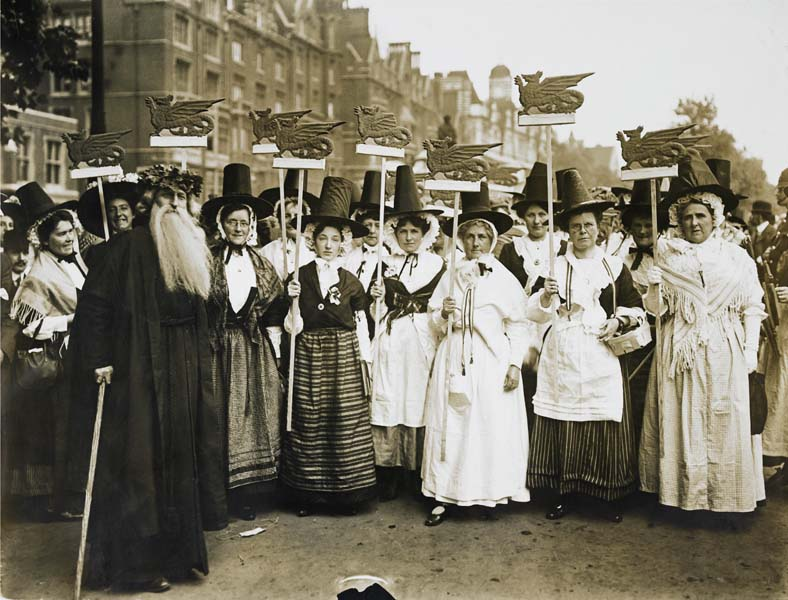
Welsh suffragists in traditional dress at the Women's Coronation Procession in London, 1911

An argument exists that the women's suffrage movement in Wales was not truly 'Welsh', based on the fact that it was organised and orchestrated by an Anglicised, English-speaking, middle-class movement that had little bearing on the true voice of the country. As it has been shown, the first people to embrace the suffrage movement were English-born and wealthy. Rose Mary Crawshay, was born in Berkshire before moving to Wales after her marriage; Millicent Mackenzie was born in Bristol and University educated. In addition, the societies that sprang up in the wealthier coastal towns of the north and south were run by middle-class women, normally of English background with little or no understanding of the Welsh language. Ceridwen Lloyd-Morgan, writing in 2000, linked support for women's suffrage from an earlier campaigning group, the temperance movement, and although the temperance movement reached out through Welsh-language periodicals such as Y Frythones and Y Gymraes, she too concluded that the cross-over was "dominated by immigrant middle-class women".

Cook and Evans argue that, despite suffrage in Wales being introduced by a new generation of immigrant middle-class women, there was still a definite 'Welshness' to the ideology fostered by the nation, which was at loggerheads with their English counterparts. Wales had shown an independent resistance to the EFF and David Lloyd George was still a national institution, despite his prominent role in the government making him an obvious target for disruption. In 1911, after the Women's Coronation Procession, Edith Mansell Moullin formed the Cymric Suffrage Union, a Welsh society based in London. (Note: In Our Mother's Land (1991), Cook and Evans state that the Cymric Suffrage Union was created after the failure of the first Conciliation Bill. The first Bill was in 1910, which does not link with the formation date of the CSU in 1911.) It attempted to link women's suffrage with Wales and Welshness, and sought to unite both Welsh men and women living in the capital to their cause. They distributed hand-bills written in Welsh to the Welsh chapels in London and translated pamphlets of the Conciliation Bill. The Union also expressed their nationality through dressing in traditional Welsh costume during parades and unlike many unions in Wales actually addressed their membership in Welsh as well as the English language at meetings. In 1912 after Lloyd George scuppered the third Conciliation Bill, Mansell Moullin quit the organisation and formed the Forward Cymric Suffrage Union, which had a more militant policy. Members wore red dragon badges with the motto 'O Iesu, n'ad Gamwaith' ('Oh Jesus do not allow unfairness').

Although the suffrage movement in Wales attempted to show a level of independence, it was always following rather than leading a national agenda. It depended in its embryonic years on celebrated suffragists from outside its borders to bring crowds to town meetings, but still relied on a network of now forgotten non-militant supporters who organised and campaigned on the ground level. And, although failing to significantly draw a rural Welsh-speaking heartland to its cause, it still embraced a national sense of pride and values that contrasted to their neighbours in England.

== Welsh suffragists ==
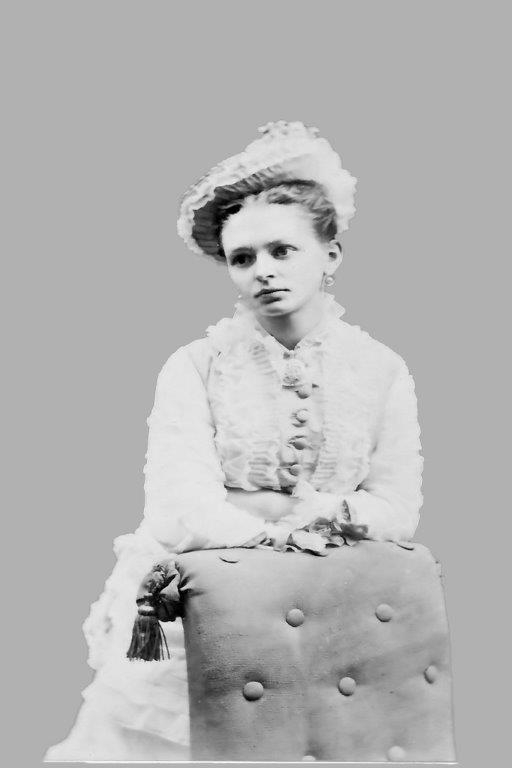
Alice Abadam, Welsh suffragette and activist

Due to her family connections and high-profile militant action, Margaret Mackworth, the 2nd Viscountess Rhondda, is probably the most well-known Welsh suffragette. Her mother Sybil Thomas and Merthyr Ironmaster's wife, Rose Mary Crawshay, were both well connected suffragists whose work is well documented. Millicent Mackenzie and to a lesser extent Amy Dillwyn are remembered more for connections outside the sphere of women's suffrage, but were both important Welsh activists for the cause. The majority of suffragists either working in Wales or Welsh suffragists who were active outside the country are many but poorly documented. Alice Abadam, a renowned speaker and activist, was the daughter of the High Sheriff of Carmarthenshire. She later became the chairperson of the Federated Council of Suffrage Movements. Rachel Barrett, a science teacher from south Wales, rose to prominence within the WSPU and was chosen by Annie Kenney to assist in running the WSPU national campaign from 1912. She was also assistant editor of The Suffragette.

Trade unionists Vernon Hartshorn and George Barker were vocal supporters of the suffrage movement, while James Grant a socialist propagandist and keen seller of The Suffragette was imprisoned for five days after being arrested for obstruction while lecturing in Treorchy Square. Mary Keating Hill, a forty-year old wife of a Cardiff insurance manager, spent three weeks in jail for resisting the police and disorderly conduct. She had been given a similar conviction days prior but her brother paid the fine; but she was determined to be imprisoned. On 21 November 1911, after the failure of the Conciliation Bill, anger spilled over into direct action and 223 suffragettes were arrested during a campaign of window smashing. Among the arrests were seven women with Welsh connections, including Edith Mansell Moullin, Mildred Mansell, the sister of Ivor Guest, MP, and Janet Boyd, sister of Sybil Thomas. (Note: Although there are recorded incidents of window smashing in Wales, Ryland Wallace (2009) has found evidence of just two incidents within Wales itself, Cardiff 1912 and Cricieth in 1914, both conducted by English protestors.)

In the period between 1918 and 1928, the WFL in Swansea produced two prominent activists in Emily Frost Phipps and her close friend Clara Neal, who were founder members of their branch. Phipps and Neal were teachers and activists, both serving as president of the National Union of Women Teachers and used that platform to press for equal franchise. Phipps also used her position as editor of the Woman Teacher to urge her colleagues to support public meetings and demonstrations.

== Timeline ==
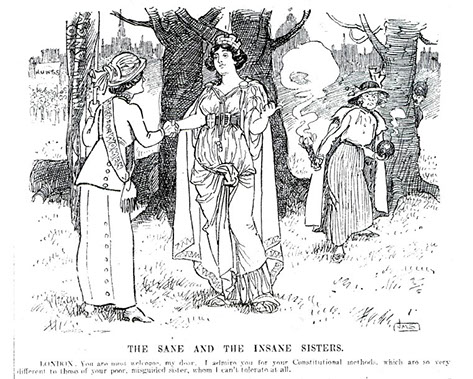
1913 Western Mail cartoon by J. M. Staniforth reflecting views towards the more militant arm of women's suffrage groups

- 1832: The Reform Act 1832 confirmed the exclusion of women from the electorate.
- 1866: Wales first women's Suffrage Petition is signed, among its signatories is Mary Rose Crawshay.
- 1884: The Aberdare, Merthyr and Dowlais District Mine Association pass a resolution to support a series of talks by Jeanette Wilkinson on women's suffrage.
- 1895: The Women's Liberal Federation merges with Cymru Fydd.
- 1907: The first branch of the National Union of Women's Suffrage Societies in Wales opens in Llandudno.
- 1908: The Cardiff and District Women's Suffrage Society is established, the first in south Wales.
- 1911: At Llanystumdwy, during the opening of the new town hall, David Lloyd George is heckled by suffragettes who are turned upon by an angry crowd. It is seen as one of the most dramatic suffrage events in Wales.
- 1911: The Cymric Suffrage Union is formed in London.
- 1913, February: A house being built for David Lloyd George is blown up by members of the WSPU.
- 1913, July: Women from NWUSS branches across Wales take part in the Suffragist Pilgrimage, ending in London.
- 1914, August: World War declared in Britain. WSPU activity immediately ceased. NUWSS activity continued peacefully.
- 1916, December: David Lloyd George replaces Asquith as prime minister.
- 1918: The Representation of the People Act 1918 enfranchised women over the age of 30 who were either a member or married to a member of the Local Government Register. About 8.4 million women gained the vote.
- 1918, November: the Parliament (Qualification of Women) Act 1918 was passed, allowing women to be elected into Parliament.
- 1921: Margaret Mackworth, the 2nd Viscountess Rhondda, forms the Six Point Group.
- 1928: Women received the vote on the same terms as men (over the age of 21) as a result of the Representation of the People Act 1928.

== See also ==
- Suffrage in the United Kingdom
- Feminism in the United Kingdom
- The Women's Library (London)—holds an extensive collection of material relating to the women's suffrage movement
- List of suffragists and suffragettes
- List of women's rights activists
- Timeline of women's suffrage

== Footnotes ==
=== Sources ===
- Aaron, Jane (1994). "Finding a Voice in Two Tongues: Gender and Colinization". In Aaron, Jane; Rees, Teresa; Betts, Sandra (eds.). Our Sisters' Land:The Changing Identities of Women in Wales. Cardiff: University of Wales Press. ISBN 978-0-7083-1247-6.
- Atkinson, Diane (1988). Votes for Women. Cambridge: Cambridge University Press. ISBN 978-0-521-31044-4.
- Beddoe, Deirdre (2000). Out of the Shadows: A History of Women in Twentieth-Century Wales. Cardiff: University of Wales Press. ISBN 978-0-7083-1591-0.
- Beddoe, Deirdre (2004). "Women and politics in twentieth century Wales" (PDF). National Library of Wales Journal. 33 (3): 333–347.
- Bohata, Kirsti (4 November 2002). "'for Wales, see England?' suffrage and the new woman in Wales". Women's History Review. 11 (4): 643–656. doi:10.1080/09612020200200342. ISSN 0011-4421.
- Butler, D. E. (1954). The Electoral System in Britain 1918-1951.
- Cook, Kay; Evans, Neil (1991). "'The Petty Antics of the Bell-Ringing Boisterous Band'? The Women's Suffrage Movement in Wales, 1890–1918". In John, Angela V. (ed.). Our Mothers' Land, Chapters in Welsh Women's History 1830–1939. Cardiff: University of Wales Press. ISBN 978-0-7083-1129-5.
- Crawford, Elizabeth (2003). The Women's Suffrage Movement: A Reference Guide 1866-1928. London: Routledge. ISBN 9781135434021.
- Crawford, Elizabeth (2013). The Women's Suffrage Movement in Britain and Ireland: A Regional Survey. London: Routledge. ISBN 9781136010545.
- Davies, John; Jenkins, Nigel; Menna, Baines; Lynch, Peredur I., eds. (2008). The Welsh Academy Encyclopaedia of Wales. Cardiff: University of Wales Press. ISBN 978-0-7083-1953-6.
- Draisey, Derek (2004). Women in Welsh History. Swansea: Draisey Publishing. ISBN 978-0-9546544-1-2.
- John, Angela V. (1991). "Beyond Paternalism: The Ironmaster's Wife in the Industrial Community". In John, Angela V. (ed.). Our Mothers' Land, Chapters in Welsh Women's History 1830–1939. Cardiff: University of Wales Press. ISBN 978-0-7083-1129-5.
- Jones, J. Graham (2003). "Lloyd George and the Suffragettes". National Library of Wales Journal. 33 (1): 1–33. ISSN 0011-4421.
- Lawson-Reay, Barbara (2015). Votes for Welsh Women: The North Wales Suffragists' Campaign 1907–1914. Conwy: Gwasg Carreg Gwalch. ISBN 978-1-84527-550-1.
- Masson, Ursula (2000). "'Political conditions in wales are quite different…' party politics and votes for women in Wales 1912–15". Women's History Review. 9 (2): 369–388. doi:10.1080/09612020000200248. S2CID 145410868.
- Wallace, Ryland (2009). The Women's Suffrage Movement in Wales, 1866–1928. Cardiff: University of Wales Press. ISBN 978-0-708-32173-7.
- Williams, Rhiannon (1991). "The True 'Cymraes': Images of Women in Women's Nineteenth-Century Welsh Periodicals". In John, Angela V. (ed.). Our Mothers' Land, Chapters in Welsh Women's History 1830–1939. Cardiff: University of Wales Press. ISBN 978-0-7083-1129-5.
