= Llandecwyn =

Coordinates: 52.918°N 4.035°W

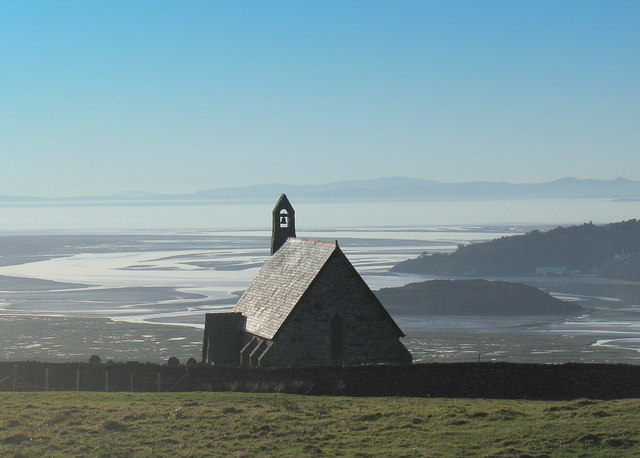
- Llandecwyn Church

- Location within Gwynedd
- OS grid reference: SH6271437017
  - Cardiff: 156 miles by car
- Community: Talsarnau
- Principal area: Gwynedd
- Country: Wales
- Sovereign state: United Kingdom
- Post town: TALSARNAU
- Postcode district: LL47
- Dialling code: 01766
- Police: North Wales
- Fire: North Wales
- Ambulance: Welsh
- UK Parliament: Dwyfor Meirionnydd
- Senedd Cymru – Welsh Parliament: Dwyfor Meirionnydd

Llandecwyn (Welsh pronunciation) is a hamlet near Penrhyndeudraeth in Gwynedd, Wales.

The bulk of the population (between 40 and 50 houses) is now located around Cilfor close to the A496 road and served by Llandecwyn railway station, with a cluster of under ten houses around the road junction at Capel Brontecwyn half a mile up the hill to the southeast, and other isolated houses and farms scattered across the hillsides. Formerly, there was a sizeable population closer to the Anglican church of Saint Tecwyn and the lakes: Llyn Tecwyn Isaf and Llyn Tecwyn Uchaf. The church now stands alone, three-quarters of a mile due east of Cilfor. There is a children's play area at Cilfor, but there are no shops or schools.

The former parish of Llandecwyn stretched from the estuary of the Afon Dwyryd at Pont Briwet to the hills of the Rhinogs. It included the Bryn Bwbach road from Capel Brontecwyn to Eisingrug, a section of the main A496 road between Llandecwyn and Talsarnau, and a section of the main A496 road between Llandecwyn and Maentwrog. It also included land across the River Dwyryd: the area of Cefn Coch and around Rhiw Goch and the road to Llanfrothen. Most of the former parish is now part of the Bro Ardudwy ministry area, which includes Harlech, a few kilometres to the southwest, and Barmouth.

Pen Llandecwyn, the small hill between Saint Tecwyn's church and Llyn Tecwyn Uchaf, is 203 m (666 ft) high.

== Religious buildings ==
The church, dedicated to Saint Tecwyn, lies at an altitude of a little over 150 m, and is the only ancient church in Ardudwy not on the coast (although the present building is Victorian). It has views over the large Dwyryd estuary towards Portmerion. The church only operates for a few services each year, but as part of the national Small Pilgrimage Places network, it marks the end of the 7 km pilgrimage route, Saint Tecwyn's Way. This starts at the church of Llanfihangel-y-traethau to the southwest, which has a window depicting the saint coming ashore in his coracle.

Also within Llandecwyn, there is a Welsh Presbyterian chapel called Bryn Tecwyn which had weekly services until December 2017. This is down on the A496, and is where the bus stop and the village war memorial are located.

Formerly Llandecwyn had other churches. Llenyrch Methodist Chapel was built in 1861 as a Sunday school and was open until the 1920s. It is now a private house. Brontecwyn Chapel (Wesleyan Methodist) was the home of the Llandecwyn Revolt School. The chapel closed in the 1990s and is now a holiday rental cottage. Capel Bach, Brontecwyn, is now a woodstore for a larger house. Capel Newydd (Calvinistic Methodist), was a few yards from Capel Bach, but is now a ruin.

== Llandecwyn Revolt School ==
Llandecwyn was the focus for a power struggle between the UK Government which was Conservative and largely Anglican, and the local Merionethshire County Council, which was largely Liberal and non-conformist. The Education Act 1902 forced local councils to pay for all schools, including church schools. The council was loath to support the school at St Tecwyn's church, so tried to close it down. A government inquiry followed which decided that Llandecwyn did not need a school. The council in response opened a school, the 'Revolt School', at Brontecwyn Chapel, which rapidly grew larger than the 'National School' at the church. A Liberal landslide in the 1906 general election swept the Conservatives from power, the Revolt School was deemed a success, and the county was given permission to build a new council school at Llandecwyn.

== Notable residents ==
The local landowners were the Wynn family of Maes y Neuadd, who were descended from the 13th Century Osbwrn Wyddel ('Osborn the Irishman'). They were related to the Oakleys of Tan y Bwlch and the Vaughns of Cors y Gedol.

Other notable residents of Llandecwyn have included:

- John Ellis (1600? – 1665), clergyman and religious writer, described as 'of Llandecwyn' in his matriculation at the University of Oxford.
- Lewis Anwyl (1705? – 1776), cleric and author, born in the parish to the rector of Llanfrothen.
- Evan Evans (Prydydd Hir (The Tall Poet) or Ieuan Fardd (Ieuan the Poet), 1731 – 1788), scholar and poet and cleric, curate at St. Tecwyn's for a year.
- Lewis Roberts (Eos Twrog, 1756 – 1844), musician, well-known harpist and crwth player, considered the best singer in the land to the accompaniment of the harp.
- Edmund Evans (1791 – 1864), born at Aberdeunant, Wesleyan preacher known as Utgorn Meirion (the clarion of Meirion).
- Ann Harriet Hughes (Gwyneth Vaughan, 1852 – 1910), author, born at Bryn-y-felin, Eisingrug and educated at Llandecwyn School.
- Sir William Nicholson (1872 - 1949), landscape painter, was a tenant of Maes y Neuadd. Nicholson painted The Hill above Harlech in about 1917, showing a landscape near Llandecwyn. The picture is in the collection of the Tate Gallery.
- David Tecwyn Evans (1876 – 1957), Methodist preacher and hymn writer, was born at Aberdeunant Uchaf in the parish and attended a National School at the church.
- Jim Cotter (died 2014), one of the founders of the Gay Christian Movement, was minister of Saint Tecwyn's in the 1970s and 1980s.

=== Mary Evans ===
Mary Evans (1735 – 1789), was a mystic and cult leader, known as 'y Fantell Wen' (Whitemantle). She was either a servant at Maentwrog rectory, or lived at Breichiau between Llys Tecwyn Uchaf and Ceunant Llennyrch. (Breichiau Copper Mine was located at NGR SH650386). She claimed to be betrothed to Christ, and led a group of followers in ceremonies on Manod Mawr and other hills. Her cult spread to Ffestiniog, Penmachno and Harlech. She died at Talsarnau despite having stated that she would never die, and was buried in Llanfihangel churchyard. Although her followers preserved scraps of her clothing as relics, the sect soon died out.

== Ancient monuments ==
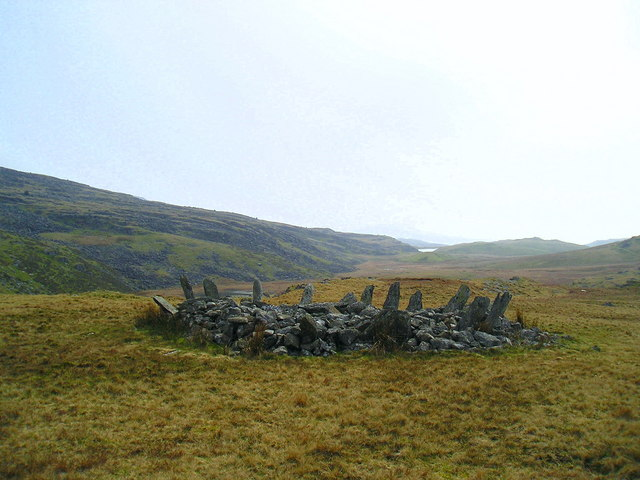
Bryn Cader Faner

The impressive ring cairn of Bryn Cader Faner (SH648353) is one of several ancient sites in the hills within the parish:

- Maes y Caerau – ancient village or settlement (SH63503621)
- Bryn-Melyn – ancient village or settlement (SH62923569)
- Y Gyrn – cairn (SH641358)
- Moel Geifr – hut circles, ancient village, or settlement (SH644356)
- Bryn Cader Faner – hut circles, ancient village or settlement (SH64543517)
- Llyn Eiddew – ring cairn (SH64603498)

=== Bedd Dorti ===
Bedd Dorti (Dorti's grave) is a mound alongside the old road from Llandecwyn to Maentwrog, near Llyn Tecwyn Uchaf. The mound is associated with Dorti'r Wrach (Dorti the Witch) who lived in the area in the 17th century. According to legend, Dorti was killed by being thrown off the high rocks above Llyn Tecwyn Uchaf in a cask, and she was buried where the cask landed.

The mound is covered with white stones, and there is a tradition that passers-by must add another stone or they will die within a year. A section of the mound has been exposed by passing vehicles, and it is thought that it is a natural mound that was topped by a small cairn of white quartz stones, suggesting that it may be a prehistoric funerary monument.
