= Ellis Wynne =

Welsh clergyman and writer, 1671–1734

Coordinates: 52.874233°N 4.087257°W

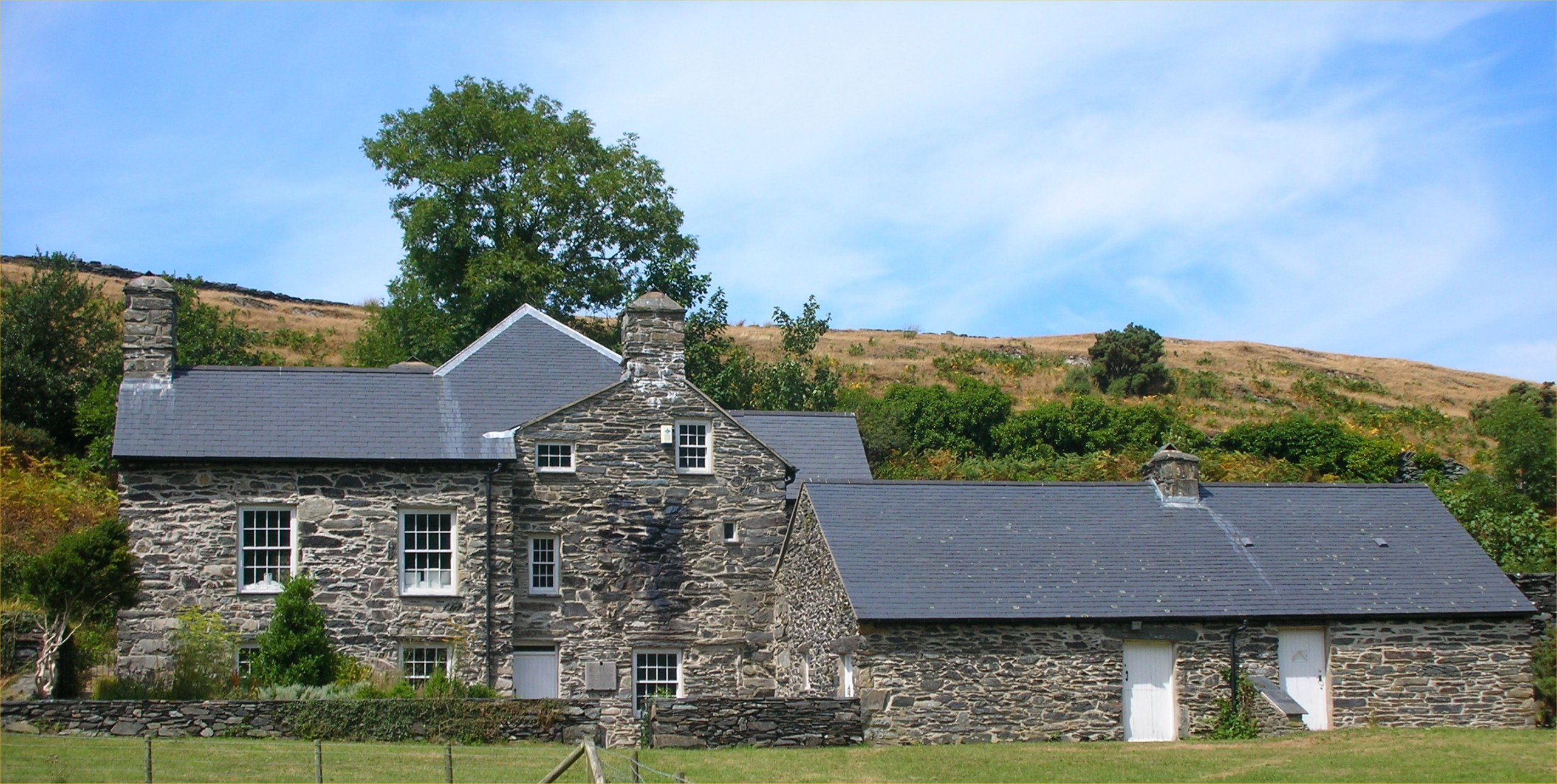
Lasynys Fawr

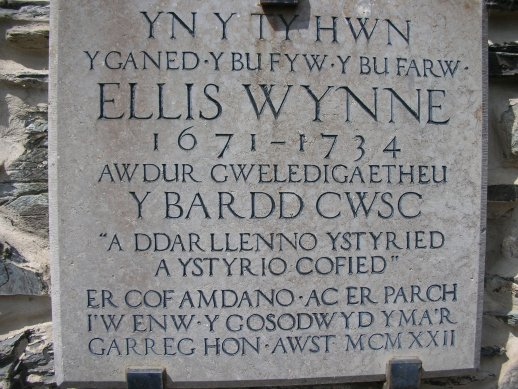
Plaque on house at Lasynys Fawr

Ellis Wynne (7 March 1671 – 13 July 1734) was a Welsh clergyman and author. He is remembered mainly for one of the most important and influential pieces of Welsh-language literature, Gweledigaetheu y Bardd Cwsc (Visions of the Sleeping Bard).

== Life ==
Born in Lasynys Fawr (grid reference SH596327) near Harlech, Gwynedd, Wynne excelled at school and entered Jesus College, Oxford on 1 March 1692. There is historical debate as to whether or not he graduated and little evidence to support either claim, but local tradition suggests he was studying law before he was convinced to take holy orders by a friend, Humphrey Humphreys, Bishop of Bangor and afterwards of Hereford. Wynne married for the first time in Llanfihangel-y-traethau Church in 1698. He was ordained priest in December 1704 and held the livings of Llandanwg, Llanbedr and Llanfair.

== Works ==
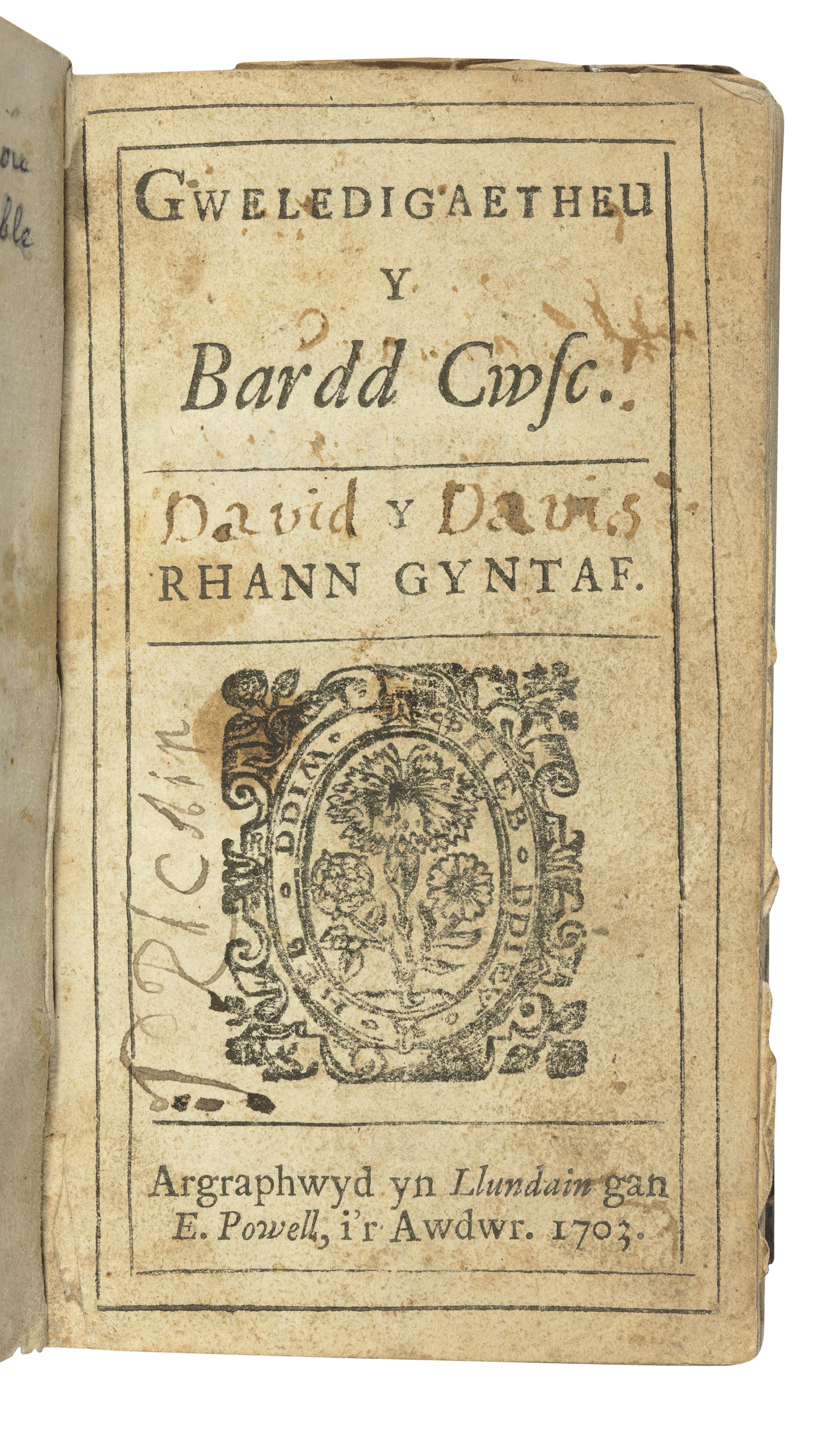
First edition of Wynne's Gweledigaetheu y Bardd Cwsc. Published in London, dated 1703

Although a respected priest, Welsh translator and hymn writer (a translation of Jeremy Taylor's Holy Living appeared in London, 1701, republished 1928), Wynne is remembered today largely for his literary output.

Gweledigaetheu y Bardd Cwsc (Visions of the Sleeping Bard), first published in London in 1703, was an adaptation of Sir Roger L'Estrange's translation of the Spanish satirist Francisco de Quevedo's Sueños (1627; "Visions"), giving savage pictures of contemporary evils, and is seen as a Welsh-language classic. It is generally said that no better model exists of "pure", idiomatic Welsh, as yet uninfluenced by English style and method. At least 32 editions had appeared up to 1932, and at least three translations into English were made. The title page bears the words Y Rhann Gyntaf (The First Part) and it has been suggested that Wynne wrote a second part – a "Vision of Heaven" – but on hearing that he had been charged with plagiarism in the first part, he destroyed the manuscript. The charges of plagiarism are no longer credited.

== Later obscurity ==
Wynne's later life is as obscure as his early years. Little is known of him after the publication of the Gweledigaethau. He was buried under the altar at Llanfair (near Harlech).
