= Mary Evans (sect leader) =

Welsh religious leader

- Mari Evan
- Born: 1735
- Died: 1789 (aged 53–54)
- Other names: Mari y fantell wen (Mary of the white cloak)

Mary Evans (Welsh: Mari Evan, 1735–1789), known as Mari y fantell wen (Mary of the white cloak) was the leader of a short-lived religious sect in Wales whose followers held that she was married to Christ and would never die. The sect soon dissolved after her death.

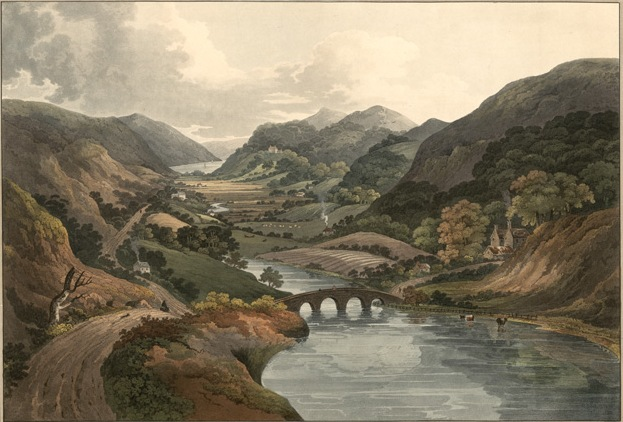
Vale of Ffestiniog, Merionethshire, where Mary Evans was active

== Life ==
Mary Evans was born in 1735, possibly in Ceredigion. She is thought to have come from Anglesey to Merionethshire around 1780. According to some accounts she was a maidservant at the Maentwrog rectory, while others say she lived in Breichiau in Llandecwyn parish, on the border with the Maentwrog. She had left her husband and was living with another man.

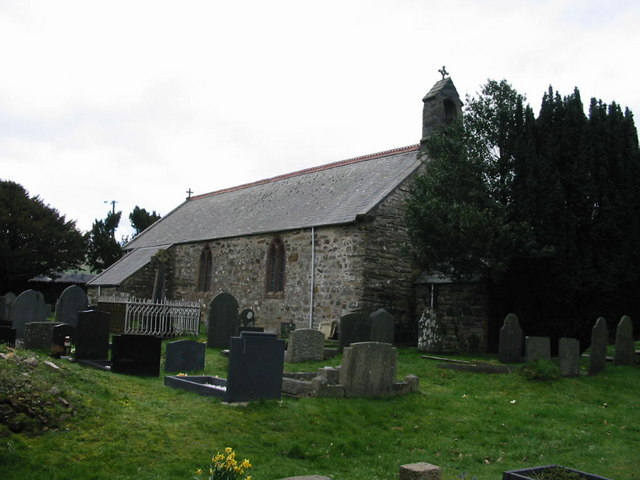
Eglwys Llanfihangel-y-traethau, where Mary Evans is buried

Mary claimed she was betrothed to Christ, and convinced many people of her tale. She wore a red mantle at the head of a long procession to a marriage festival in Ffestiniog church, followed by a marriage feast in a tavern in Ffestiniog. She received many bridal gifts. The sect became widespread around Ffestiniog, Penmachno and Harlech. The members seem to have been simple, good and harmless people. They may have numbered sixty or seventy, and met in houses and "on hill tops". Mary and her followers wore white mantles on Sundays, and held ceremonies on the mountains above Ffestiniog. Little is known for sure about their beliefs or practices.

Mary died in Talsarnau. She had said she would never die, so there was a long delay before her body was buried, but it was at last interred on 28 October 1789 in Llanfihangel-y-traethau churchyard. The parish constable insisted on the burial for reasons of hygiene.

== Legacy ==
Mary's grave is still visible. Her tombstone is a roughly carved slab of slate. On its back a devotee has scratched her pseudonym Mari y Fantell Wen (Mary Whitemantle). Her tombstone gives her age as 54. Her followers kept scraps of her clothing as relics for some time, but the sect did not long survive her death. Although little is known about the prophetess, she was remembered in the area for several generations. Her life was recalled in children's stories. As late as the 1930s children were told to come inside before dark or Mari'r Fantell Wen would get them.

The Dictionary of Welsh Biography has updated her description from "Evans, Mary, an impostor" to "EVANS, MARY (1735 - 1789), mystic, known in her day as 'Whitemantle' (y Fantell Wen)".

== Sources ==
- "Aberdwyryd", The Vale of Ffestiniog, archived from the original on 13 February 2020
- Brackney, William H. (3 May 2012), Historical Dictionary of Radical Christianity, Scarecrow Press, ISBN 978-0-8108-7365-0
- Harrison, J. F. C. (7 May 2013), The Second Coming: Popular Millenarianism, 1780–1850, Routledge, ISBN 978-1-136-29876-9
- Jenkins, Robert Thomas (1959), "EVANS, MARY", Dictionary of Welsh Biography, National Library of Wales
- Morris, Jan (24 April 2014), Wales: Epic Views of a Small Country, Penguin Books Limited, ISBN 978-0-241-97024-9
- Roberts, Guto (2016), "Mari'r Fantell Wen", Gwefan Gymunedol Talsarnau (in Welsh)
