= Bryn Cader Faner =

Archaeological site in Gwynedd, Wales

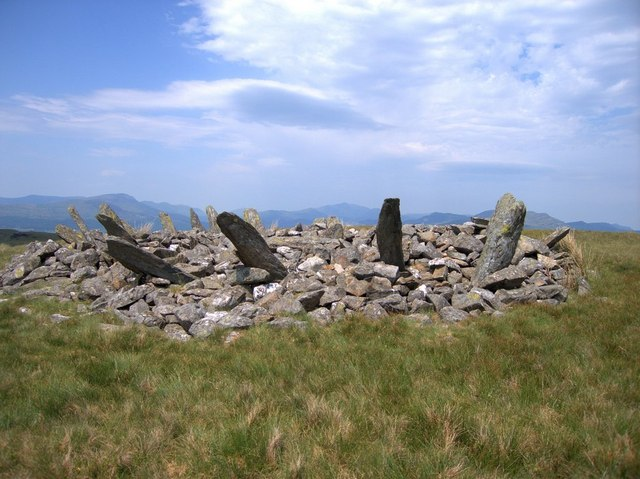
- The cairn in 2006
- Interactive map of Bryn Cader Faner
- 52.8982325°N 4.0113721°W
- Type: Cairn
- Location: Wales, United Kingdom

History
- Built: c. 2250 BC

Site notes
- Material: Stone
- Diameter: 8.7 m (29 ft)

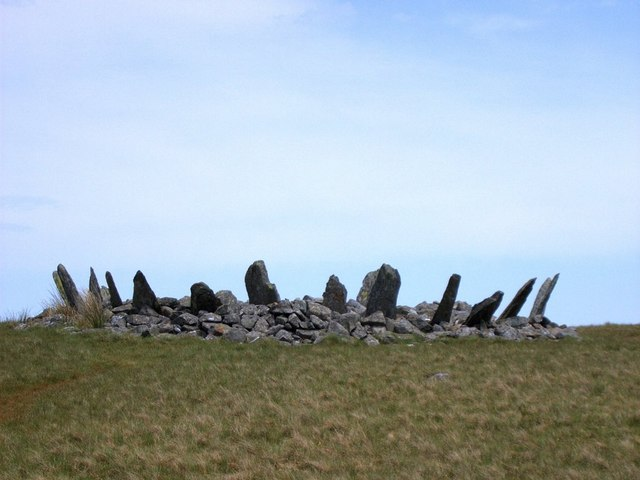
Bryn Cader Faner

The Bryn Cader Faner is a Bronze Age round cairn which lies to the east of the small hamlet of Talsarnau in the Ardudwy area of Gwynedd in Wales. The diameter is 8.7 metres (29 ft) and there are 18 thin jagged pillars which jut upwards from the low cairn. It is thought to date back to the late third millennium BC. The site was disturbed by 19th-century treasure hunters, who left a hole in the centre, indicating the position of a cist or a grave. Originally there may have been about 30 pillars, each some 2 metres (7 ft) long. However, before World War 2, the British Army used the site for gunnery practice. The Army damaged many of the stones on the east side.

Bryn Cader Faner is thought to mean 'the hill with the chair with the flag' or 'the hill of the throne with the flag'.
