= Eisingrug =

Coordinates: 52.889°N 4.060°W

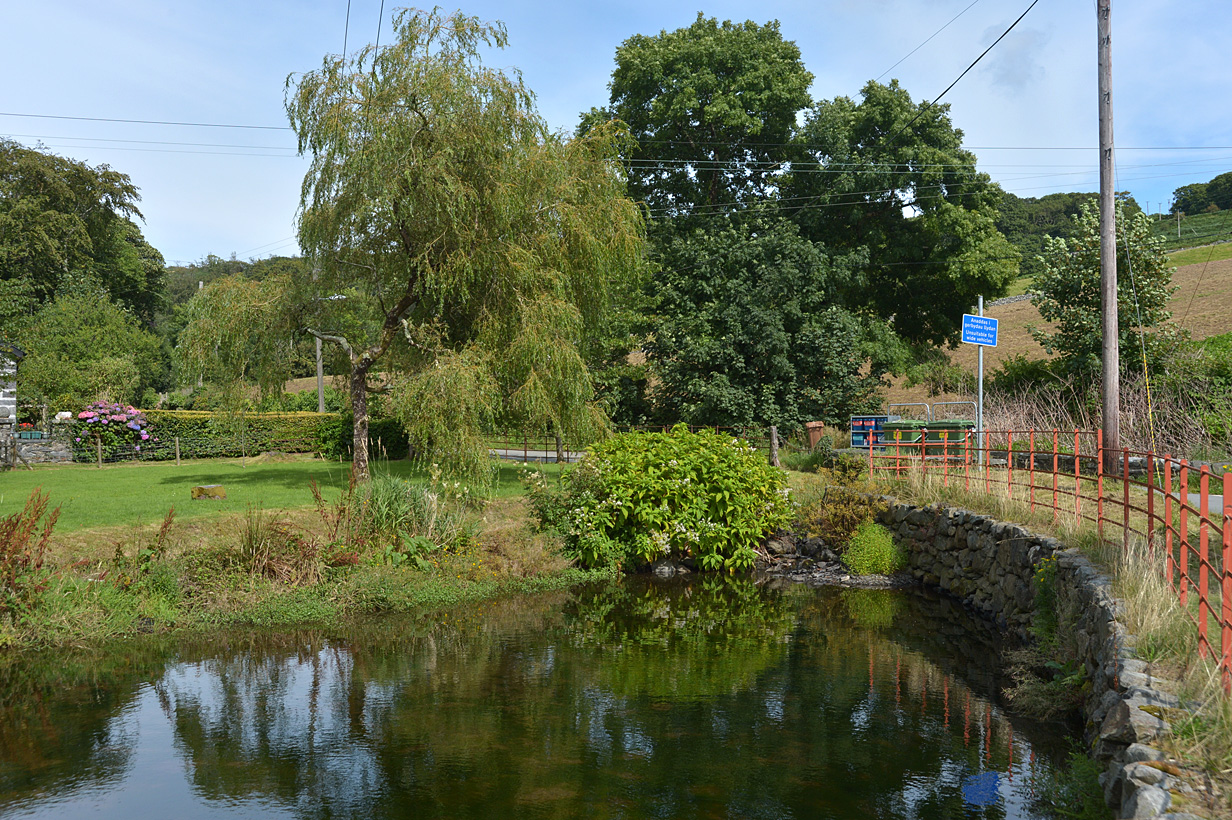
- Pond in Eisingrug

- Location within Gwynedd
- OS grid reference: SH614344
- Community: Talsarnau
- Principal area: Gwynedd
- Preserved county: Gwynedd
- Country: Wales
- Sovereign state: United Kingdom
- Post town: TALSARNAU
- Postcode district: LL47
- Dialling code: 01766
- Police: North Wales
- Fire: North Wales
- Ambulance: Welsh
- UK Parliament: Dwyfor Meirionnydd
- Senedd Cymru – Welsh Parliament: Dwyfor Meirionnydd

Eisingrug (meaning: a place where corn was winnowed after husking) is a rural hamlet near Harlech, Gwynedd, Wales. It is located to the southeast of Porthmadog.

Formerly at the edge of the parish of Llandecwyn, the hamlet was served by the church of Saint Tecwyn in the hills above Llandecwyn, and a Wesleyan Methodist chapel at the other end of the Bryn Bwbach to Esingrug road. A Methodist missionary visited Eisingrug in December 1845.

The Cambrian Line railway passes close to the village. The nearest railway station is to the north at Talsarnau.

In the northeast is the 14th century manor house, Maes-y-Neuadd, formerly home of the Wynn family - land owners, Sheriffs of Merioneth, descended from the 13th Century Osbwrn Wyddel - 'Osborn the Irishman' - related to the Oakleys of Tan y Bwlch and the Vaughns of Cors y Gedol.

To the southwest is The Glyn and Brogyntyn Estate and to the northwest is Black Wood, a conifer plantation on a steep east-facing hillside with alternating rows of 2 separate conifer species.

The area affords good views over northern parts of Cardigan Bay.

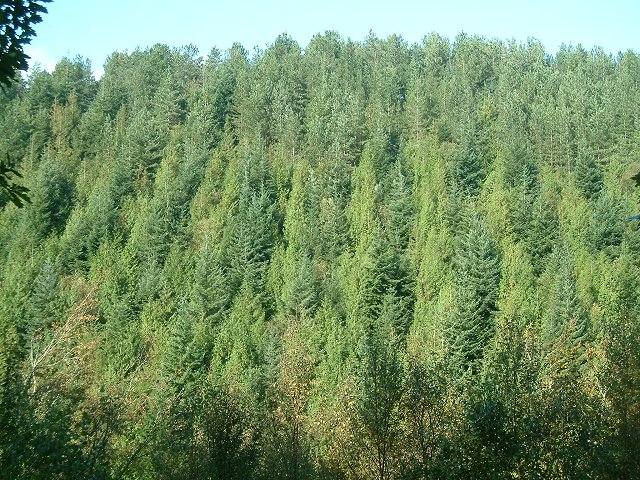
Black Wood
