= Edith Mansell-Moullin =

English suffragist (1858–1941)

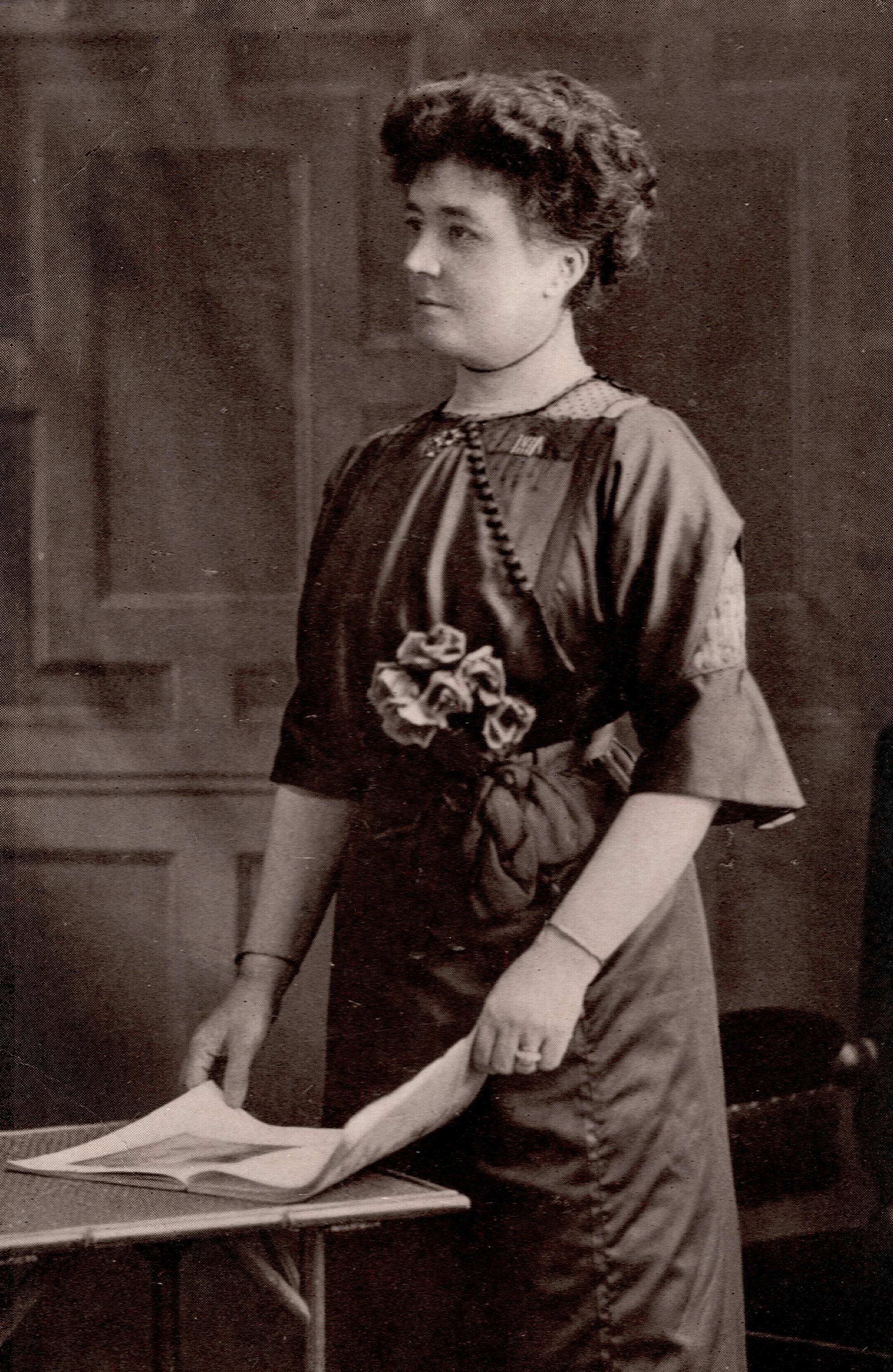
- Edith Mansell Moullin
- Born: Edith Ruth Thomas; September 1858
- Died: 5 March 1941; London, England
- Other name: Edith Ruth Mansell-Moullin
- Occupations: Social activist, suffragist

Edith Mansell-Moullin (September 1858 – 5 March 1941) was an English suffragist of Welsh heritage and social activist. Proud of her Welsh roots, she founded the Cymric Suffrage Union, which was dedicated to gaining women's suffrage for Welsh women. She was the co-organizer of the Welsh contingent of the 1911 procession of the Women’s Suffrage Union’s "Great Demonstration" held in 1911 in London. Part of the more militant British suffrage contingent, she was imprisoned for dissidence and refused to stop government agitation during World War I.

== Biography ==
Edith Ruth Thomas was born in September 1858 to Anne (née Lloyd) and David Collet Thomas. After completing her education, she worked in the Bethnal Green slums and continued to do so after her 1885 marriage to the well-known surgeon, Charles William Mansell-Moullin, who worked at the Royal London Hospital. She witnessed the Match Girl's Strike in 1888 and assisted dock workers in a soup kitchen during the London Dock strike of 1889. She continued her settlement house work until around 1906, when she joined the Women's Industrial Council and became chair of the Investigation Committee of the council. She also joined the Women's Social and Political Union (WSPU) around 1907 and became the first treasurer of the Church League for Women's Suffrage. Both Mansell-Moullins were suffragists. The doctor belonged to the Men's League for Women's Suffrage and served as a vice president. Mansell-Moullin was a member of the Women's Freedom League besides the WSPU.

Mansell-Moullin took part in several protests including the 1910 demonstration held in Hyde Park, in which she shared the stage with Emmeline Pankhurst. On 17 June 1911, 40,000 women marched in the "Great Demonstration" sponsored by the Women’s Suffrage Union, as part of the coronation procession for George V. Mansell-Moullin organized the Welsh contingent of the parade with Rachel Barrett and encouraged the Welsh participants to wear the national costume. Proud of her Welsh parentage, after the procession, Mansell-Moullin founded the Cymric Suffrage Union (CSU), whose aim was to secure the right to vote for Welsh women. Though primarily based in London there were branches in Wales and she made speaking tours in northern Wales to promote suffrage. The CSU also translated documents about enfranchisement into the Welsh language and distributed them to churches with Welsh congregations. In November 1911, Mansell-Moullin participated in the demonstration before Parliament in which she was among the 200 women arrested. She was charged with disturbing the peace and attempting to break the police lines, which she denied. She was sentenced and spent five days in Holloway Prison.

After her imprisonment, the CSU was disbanded and a more militant organization, the Forward Cymric Suffrage Union (FCSU), was formed in October 1912. She and her husband spoke out against force-feeding suffrage prisoners and the Mansel Moullin's home became a meeting center for discussing strategy. In 1913 Mansel Moullin became the honorary secretary of the group Sylvia Pankhurst formed to gain the repeal of the Cat and Mouse Act. This act replaced force-feeding by releasing prisoners when they became ill from lack of food, but then re-imprisoned them as soon as they had sufficiently recovered. That same year, Dr. Mansell-Moullin performed surgery on Emily Davison after she was trampled by King George V's horse at The Derby, though he was unable to save her.

Mansell-Moullin resigned from the WSPU, in part because of its decision to suspend anti-government protests during the war. As a pacifist, Mansell-Moullin neither supported the war, nor believed that social responsibility should be suspended. Disturbed by the practice of arresting German mine workers who were working in Welsh mines, causing the miner's families hardship, Mansell-Moullin sent appeals on their behalf and collected funds through the FCSU to assist them. She also sent protests about the low wages being paid to women during the war, requesting that public funds be used to supplement the wages of women doing relief work. She resigned from her positions in the FCSU in 1916 due to health concerns, though she continued to work in social programs and with pacifist organizations. In 1931, she chaired the Society for Cultural Relations with the USSR and worked as a volunteer at St Dunstan's, which operated a home for blind veterans.

Mansell-Moullin died on 5 March 1941 at her son's home in London, one year after her husband's death.

== Posthumous recognition ==
Her name and picture (and those of 58 other women's suffrage supporters) are on the plinth of the statue of Millicent Fawcett in Parliament Square, London, unveiled in 2018.
