= Lewis Anwyl =

Lewis Anwyl, also spelled Lewis Anwil, (c. 1705–1776) was a Welsh cleric and author.

== Early life ==
Born about 1705 at Llandecwyn, Gwynedd, his father was Rev. William Anwyl. In 1726, he graduated from All Souls College, Oxford. He married Gwen Gryffyd, whose family was of Bach-y-Saint in Carnarvon.

== Career ==
In 1740, he became the curate-in-charge of Ysbyty Ifan and two years later he relocated to Abergele, where he was the vicar.

Among his published works were Y Nefawl Ganllaw, Neu'r Union Ffordd i Fynwes Abraham (The Nefawl Guide, or Exact Way to Abraham's bosom, 1740), Cyngor yr Athraw i Rieni ynghylch dwyn eu plant i fyny (The advice of a teacher on the upbringing of children, 1740), and Cristianowgrwydd Catholig, neu Draethawd Bŷrr Tuagat Leihau Awrth Ddadlau Ymhlith Cristianogion.

He died in Abergele and was buried on 27 February 1776 in the parish church, near the baptismal font.
