= Ffestiniog =

Community in Gwynedd, Wales

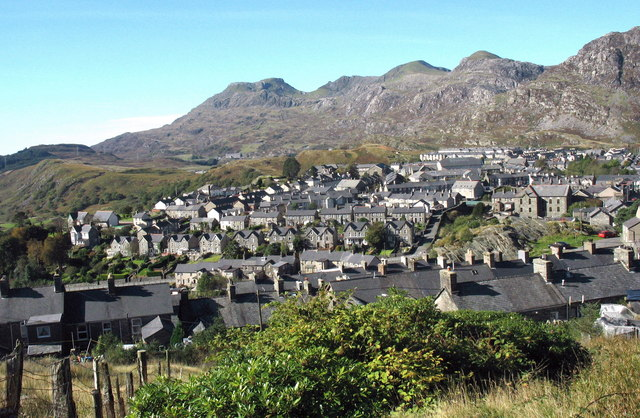
- Blaenau Ffestiniog

- Location within Gwynedd
- Area: 56.99 km^{2} (22.00 sq mi)
- Population: 4,665 (2021 census)
  - Density: 82/km^{2} (210/sq mi)
- OS grid reference: SH705455
- Community: Ffestiniog
- Principal area: Gwynedd
- Preserved county: Gwynedd
- Country: Wales
- Sovereign state: United Kingdom
- Post town: Blaenau Ffestiniog
- Postcode district: LL41
- Dialling code: 01766
- Police: North Wales
- Fire: North Wales
- Ambulance: Welsh
- UK Parliament: Dwyfor Meirionnydd
- Senedd Cymru – Welsh Parliament: Gwynedd Maldwyn
- List of places UK Wales Gwynedd 52.99°N 3.93°W Map of the community

Ffestiniog (/fɛsˈtɪnjɒɡ/; Welsh pronunciation: [fɛstˈɪnjɔg]) is a community in Gwynedd, Wales, containing several villages, in particular the settlements of Llan Ffestiniog and Blaenau Ffestiniog. At the 2021 census, it had a population of 4,665 people in 2,157 households.

== History ==
Ffestiniog was a parish in Cantref Ardudwy; in 1284, Ardudwy became part of the county of Merionethshire, which became an administrative county in 1888. Mary Evans (1735–89) founded a sect in Ffestiniog around 1780, whose believers held that she had married Christ in a ceremony held in Ffestiniog church. The sect soon died out after her death. The parish was created an urban district in 1894. On 1 April 1974, under the Local Government Act 1972, Ffestiniog Urban District was merged with other districts to form Meirionnydd District, which was itself abolished in 1996. Ffestiniog became a community with an elected town council.

Ffestiniog Golf Club was founded in 1893 and closed in 2014.

== Toponymy ==
Celtic place-name in *-ākon "place of", then, "place belonging to, territory of" > Old Welsh -auc, -awg > Welsh -og. The form -iog with an additional /i/ can be explained by the preceding element, which is a personal name ending with -i-us : Festinius. The whole name should be *Festiniākon. Probably same name as Festigny (France, e.g.: Festigny, Marne, Festiniacus in 853).

== Demographics ==
Census population of Ffestiniog community
Census	Population	Female	Male	Households	Source
2001	4,830	2,513	2,317	2,112	
2011	4,875	2,478	2,397	2,283	
2021	4,665	2,355	2,310	2,157	

== See also ==
- Festiniog and Blaenau Railway
- Ffestiniog power station
- Ffestiniog Railway
