= Talsarnau =

Village in Gwynedd, Wales

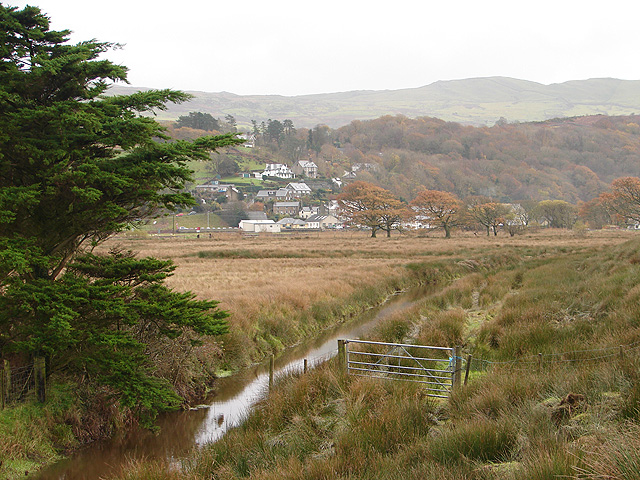
- A view towards Talsarnau

- Location within Gwynedd
- Population: 550 (2011)
- OS grid reference: SH612358
- Community: Talsarnau
- Principal area: Gwynedd
- Preserved county: Gwynedd
- Country: Wales
- Sovereign state: United Kingdom
- Post town: TALSARNAU
- Postcode district: LL47
- Dialling code: 01766
- Police: North Wales
- Fire: North Wales
- Ambulance: Welsh
- UK Parliament: Dwyfor Meirionnydd
- Senedd Cymru – Welsh Parliament: Dwyfor Meirionnydd
- List of places UK Wales Gwynedd 52.903°N 4.064°W Map of the community

Talsarnau (Welsh pronunciation) is a village and community in the Ardudwy area of Gwynedd in Wales. Its population was 525 in 2001, and had increased to 550 at the 2011 Census.

The village of Talsarnau is situated on the A496 coastal road between Maentwrog and Harlech, close to the hamlets of Eisingrug and Llandecwyn. It has one primary school and one pub, "The Ship Aground", which starts serving food from 18:00 (6pm).

Talsarnau railway station on the Cambrian Line serves the village. The community also includes Ynys Gifftan and Soar, Gwynedd.

== Glyn Cywarch ==
To the south of the village, on the Harlech road, stands the Glyn Cywarch estate, a historic home of the Wynn family. The present house was built c.1616 by William and Katherine Wynn. It is a Grade II* listed building, and its gardens are designated, also at Grade II*, on the Cadw/ICOMOS Register of Parks and Gardens of Special Historic Interest in Wales.

== Notable people ==
- Mary Evans (1735 – 1789 in Talsarnau), leader of a short-lived religious cult.
- Ann Harriet Hughes (1852–1910) a Welsh language novelist
- Sir Alfred Charles Glyn Egerton, FRS (1886–1959), chemist, he pioneered the use of liquid methane as a fuel.
