= Barmouth =

Seaside town in Gwynedd, Wales

Barmouth: Welsh: Abermaw
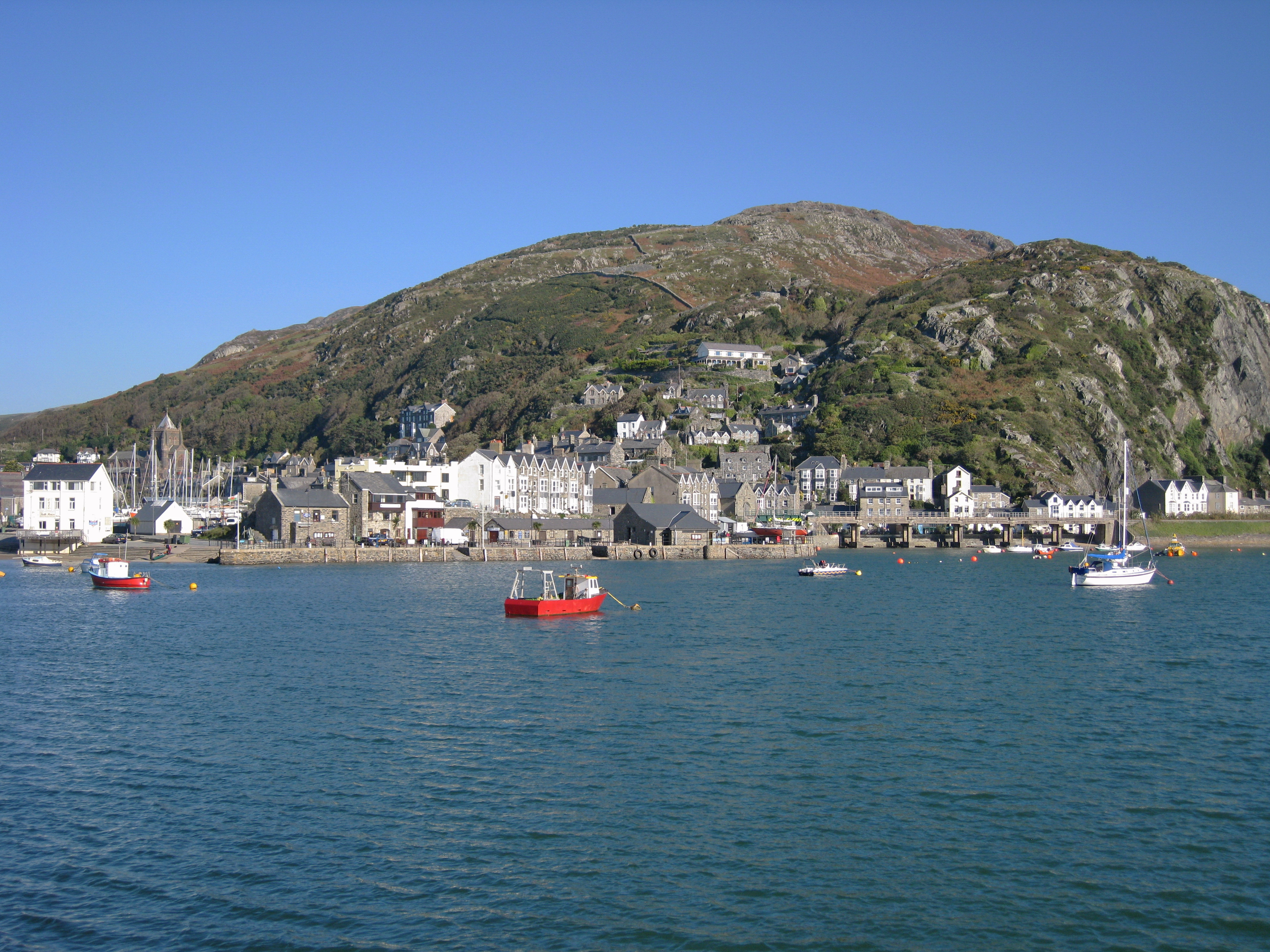
- Barmouth on the Mawddach estuary

- Location within Gwynedd
- Population: 2,522
- OS grid reference: SH613158
- Community: Barmouth
- Principal area: Gwynedd
- Preserved county: Gwynedd
- Country: Wales
- Sovereign state: United Kingdom
- Post town: BARMOUTH
- Postcode district: LL42
- Dialling code: 01341
- Police: North Wales
- Fire: North Wales
- Ambulance: Welsh
- UK Parliament: Dwyfor Meirionnydd
- Senedd Cymru – Welsh Parliament: Gwynedd Maldwyn
- List of places UK Wales Gwynedd 52.722°N 4.055°W Map of the community

Barmouth (formal Welsh: Abermaw, or Abermawddach; colloquially Y Bermo) is a seaside town and community in the county of Gwynedd, north-west Wales; it lies on the estuary of the Afon Mawddach and Barmouth Bay, part of Cardigan Bay. The Welsh form of the name is derived from aber (estuary) and the river's name, Mawddach. The English form of the name is a corruption of the earlier Welsh form Abermawdd. The community includes the villages of Llanaber, Cutiau and Caerdeon.

== History and literature ==
"Finally, when we left the southern bank and crawled to the opposite side over the bridge, almost a mile long and supported on mighty posts of oak, on our right the river bed, inundated by the sea at high tide and looking like a mountain lake, on our left Barmouth bay stretching to the bright horizon, I felt so joyful that I often scarcely knew where to look first... To the south-west the terrain lay open in a wide semi-circle, so that from the forecourt of the house you had a view of the full length of the estuary from Dolgellau to Barmouth, while these places themselves were excluded from the panorama, which was almost devoid of human habitations, by a rocky outcrop on one side and a laurel-grown hill on the other. Only on the far side of the river could the little village of Arthog be seen - in certain atmospheric conditions, said Austerlitz, you might have thought it an eternity away - infinitesimally small, with the shadow of Cadair Idris rising behind it to a height of almost three thousand feet above the shimmering sea."

— W. G. Sebald, Austerlitz, pp. 113–114

Located in the historic county of Merionethshire, Barmouth was first recorded in 1565 as a hamlet of four houses. In the late 18th century, it grew around the shipbuilding industry, and a harbour was built for fishing and exporting wool from nearby sheep farms. In the first half of the 19th century, Barmouth became known as a seaside resort. After Barmouth Bridge was constructed and the railway reached the town in 1867, more and more tourists arrived. New guest houses were built, but Barmouth never developed a conspicuous resort architecture. It was still mainly visited for the experience of the sea and the mountains, especially Cadair Idris. The German philologist Friedrich Althaus (1829–1897) wrote in 1889: "Cader Idris is to Barmouth what the Vesuvius is to Naples. (…) The prospect from the summit is said to be the grandest in all of Wales. (…) Climbing Cader Idris therefore takes top priority among many visitors of Barmouth."

William Wordsworth, another visitor to Barmouth in the 19th century, described it thus: "With a fine sea view in front, the mountains behind, the glorious estuary running eight miles [13 km] inland, and Cadair Idris within compass of a day's walk, Barmouth can always hold its own against any rival."

Barmouth features prominently in the serialised short-story 'Rob the Red-Hand' by Dolgellau-born Thomas Richards, published in the Hobart Town Magazine between 1833 and 1834. In addition, Barmouth is a key location in the novel Austerlitz by Max Sebald. The town is featured in an idyllic light, with the narrator visiting several times during his childhood (see box).

In January 2014, two trains were stranded at Barmouth after severe winter storms destroyed the sea wall at nearby Llanaber.

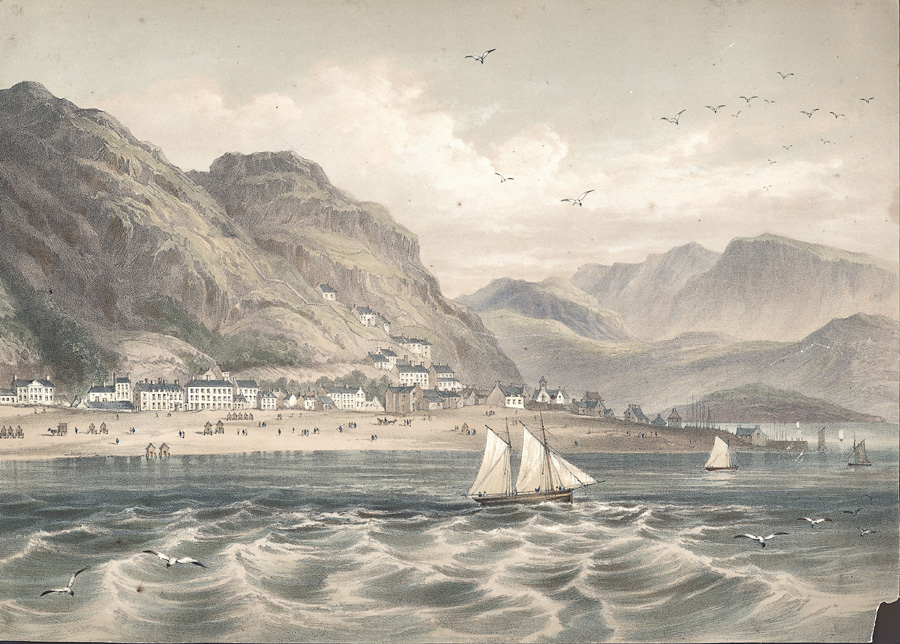
Barmouth, with Cadair Idris in the background, 1865

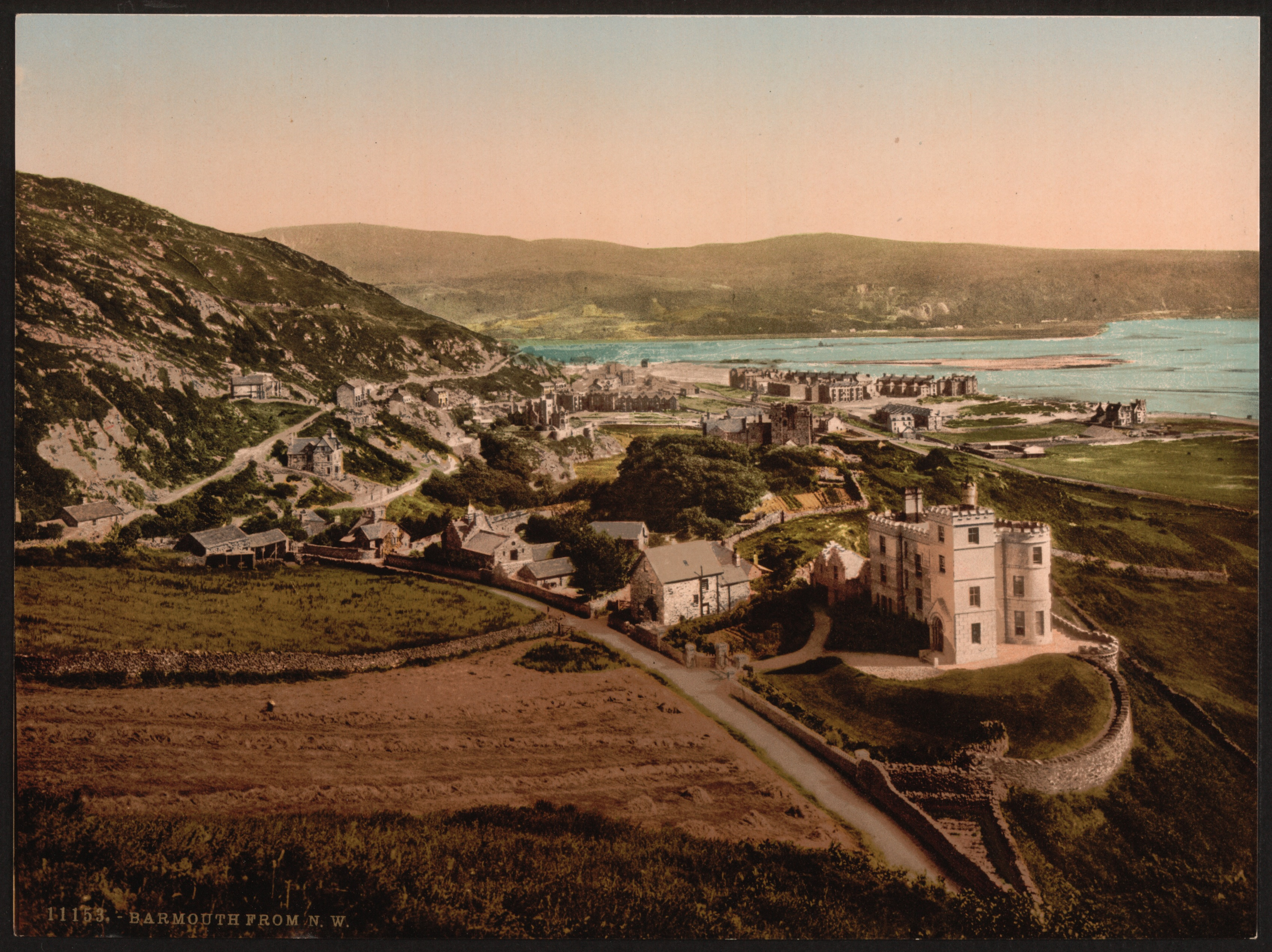
The town in the 1890s

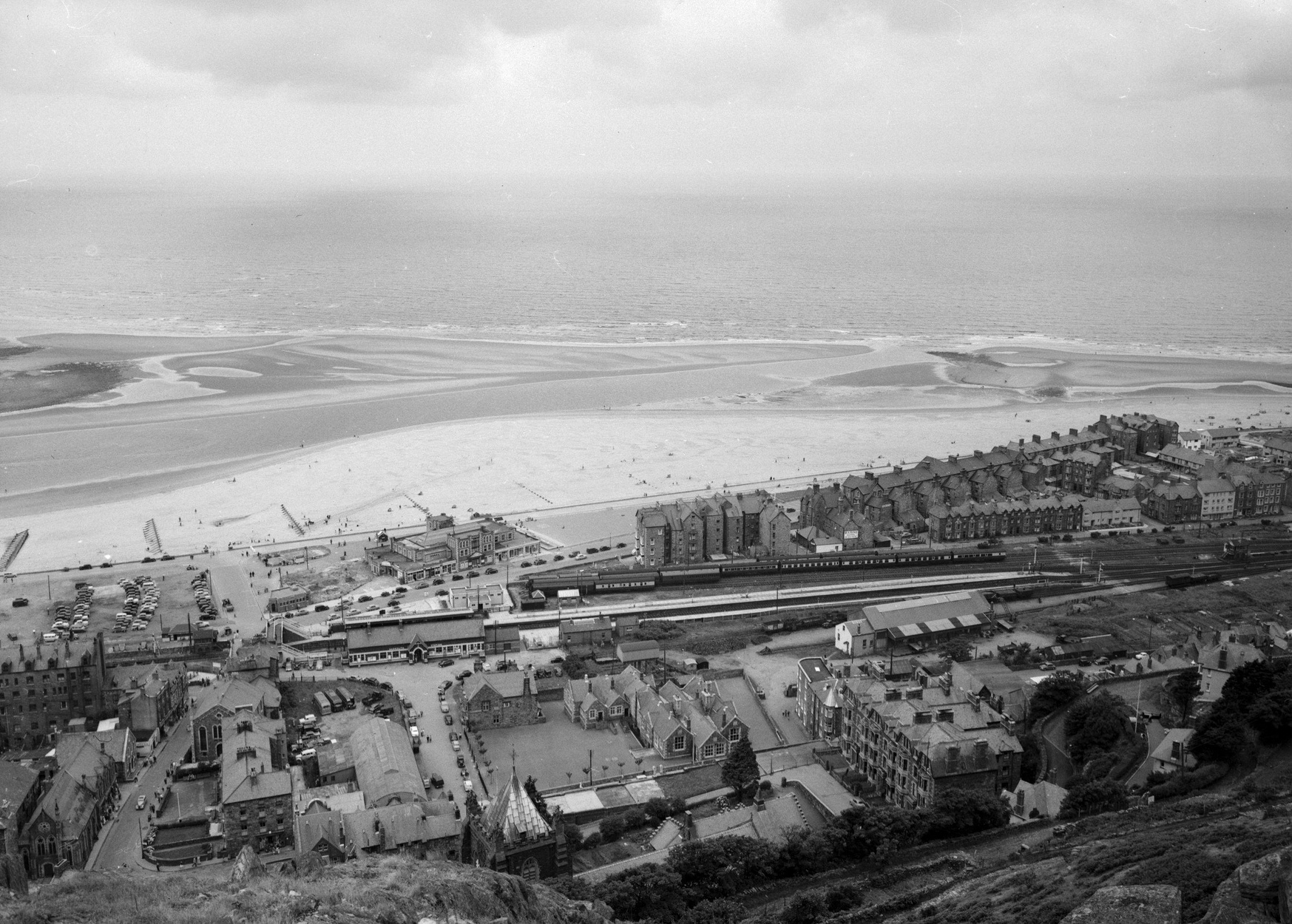
View of Barmouth from the hills, 1965

== Sights ==
St John's Church, overlooking Barmouth and Cardigan Bay

Notable buildings include the medieval Tŷ Gwyn tower house, the 19th-century Tŷ Crwn roundhouse prison, St John's Church, St Mary and St Bodfan Church in Llanaber, and Tyn-y-Coed Farmhouse in Caerdeon.

Dinas Oleu (Citadel of Light), which is located east of the town on the adjoining hillside, was the first tract of land to be donated to the National Trust.

Panorama Walk, to the east of the town, was developed as a coastal footpath in the Victorian era to contribute to the town's attractions for visitors. The walk is designated at Grade II on the Cadw/ICOMOS Register of Parks and Gardens of Special Historic Interest in Wales. On the route of the walk stands the Glan-y-Mawddach estate. Originally a Regency villa, the house, which is listed at Grade II, was extended in the late 19th and early 20th centuries and an important garden was laid out, which is designated at Grade II* on the Cadw/ICOMOS register.

== Transport ==
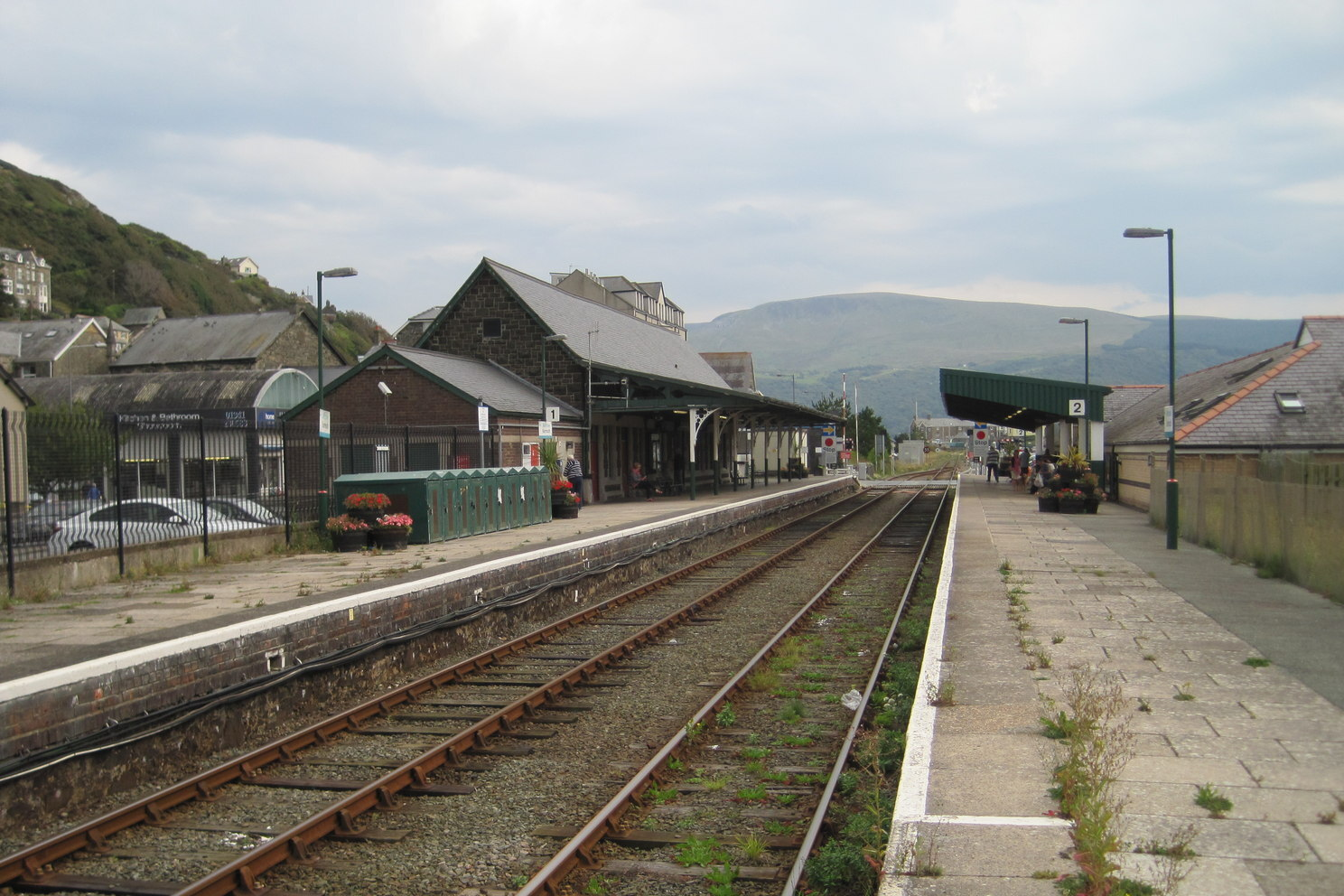
Barmouth station

Barmouth Bridge takes the Cambrian Line across the Mawddach estuary

The town is served by Barmouth railway station. Transport for Wales operate northbound services to Pwllheli via Harlech, Porthmadog and Criccieth; eastbound services travel to Birmingham International via Tywyn, Machynlleth, Welshpool, Shrewsbury, Telford Central and Wolverhampton.

Connections for southbound services to Borth and Aberystwyth can be made at Dovey Junction or Machynlleth. Barmouth Bridge, which takes the Cambrian Line over the River Mawddach, was also previously at the end of the Ruabon–Barmouth line; this line passed through Bala and Dolgellau. The southern end of the bridge is now the start of the Mawddach Trail, a cycle path and walkway that uses the old trackbed.

Local bus services are provided by Lloyds Coaches and link the town with nearby destinations such as Harlech, Tan-y-Bwlch, Porthmadog and Dolgellau. Cross-country bus services are available to Wrexham via Bala, Corwen and Llangollen, as part of the Welsh Government funded TrawsCymru network.

The Barmouth Ferry sails from Barmouth to Penrhyn Point, where it connects with the narrow-gauge Fairbourne Railway for the village of Fairbourne. The town has an RNLI lifeboat station, which includes a visitors' centre with shop and viewing gallery.

== Sport ==
Barmouth has one major football team: Barmouth & Dyffryn United, which competes in the Central Wales Football League. Barmouth is the venue for the annual Barmouth Beach Race, a motocross event. Usually taking place on the last weekend in October, the event sees riders take part in beach racing, using a temporary motocross course constructed on the beach. Over 200 riders typically take part in this event, with spectators attending free of charge. The event attracts champion riders from England and Wales. The harbour hosts the annual Three Peaks yacht race.

== Notable people ==
- John Griffith (1821–1877), a journalist, brought up in Barmouth
- Fanny Talbot (1824–1917), landowner and philanthropist, donated Cliff of Light (Dinas Olau in Welsh), to the National Trust.
- Jim Valentine (1866–1904), rugby union and Northern Union player for Swinton Lions.
- Herbert Tudor Buckland (1869–1951), architect, known for his seminal Arts and Crafts movement houses.
- Commander Harold Lowe (1882–1944), fifth officer of the RMS Titanic, lived most of his early life here.
- John Rippiner Heath (1887–1950), physician and composer.
- Major Bill Tilman, (1898–1977), English mountaineer and explorer, known for his Himalayan climbs and sailing voyages, lived in Barmouth for many years.
- Adrian Dingle (1911–1974), Cornish-Canadian artist.
- Johnny Williams (1926–2007), boxer, once both the British and Empire heavyweight champion.
- Tommy Nutter (1943–1992), British tailor, reinvented the Savile Row suit in the 1960s.
- Russell Davies (born 1946), journalist and broadcaster, presents Brain of Britain on BBC Radio 4.
- Charlie Brooks (born 1981), actress, known for EastEnders.

== See also ==
- St David's Church, Barmouth
- St John's Church, Barmouth
- St Tudwal's Church, Barmouth
- St Mary and St Bodfan Church, Llanaber
- Tyn-y-Coed Farmhouse, Caerdeon
