= Bodfan =

Welsh saint

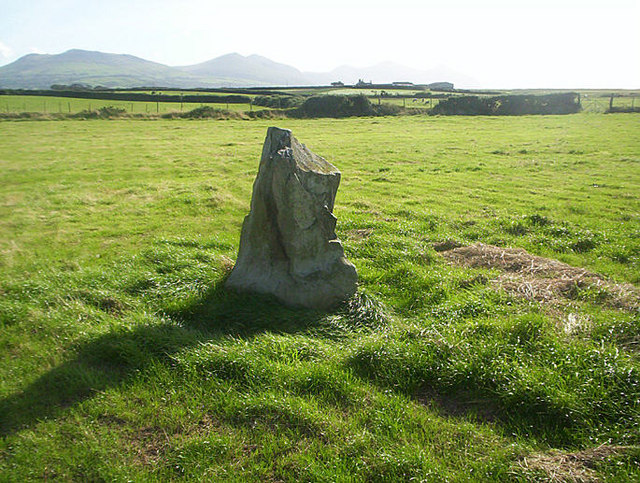
- Bodfan Standing Stone, Llanaber

Missionary
- Born: 7th century North Wales
- Venerated in: Catholic Church, Anglican Communion
- Feast: 2 June
- Patronage: Llanaber, Abergwyngregyn

Bodfan (or Bodfaen) was a Welsh saint in the Catholic and Anglican churches.

== Biography ==
He was the son of Helig ap Glanawg and died in the 7th century. Supposedly, he saw his family's land inundated by the sea and became a religious. Bodfan then became a monk on Bardsey Island and later established the first church at Llanaber. His brothers Brothen, Celynin and Rhichwyn are also regarded as saints and also have churches dedicated to them around Gwynedd and Conwy.

== Legacy ==
He is the patron saint of many churches in Gwynedd in north-west Wales, such as St Mary and St Bodfan Church in Llanaber and St Bodfan church in Abergwyngregyn. Also, in Llanaber are the Llanaber Stones, they are two very large rocks with 5th- and 6th-century Latin carvings, 1 km from the local church, they are known in the area as St Bodfan's Stones.

His feast day is on 2 June.

== See also ==
- Helig ap Glanawg
- Llanaber
