= Llanaber =

Village in Gwynedd, Wales

Coordinates: 52.740°N 4.075°W

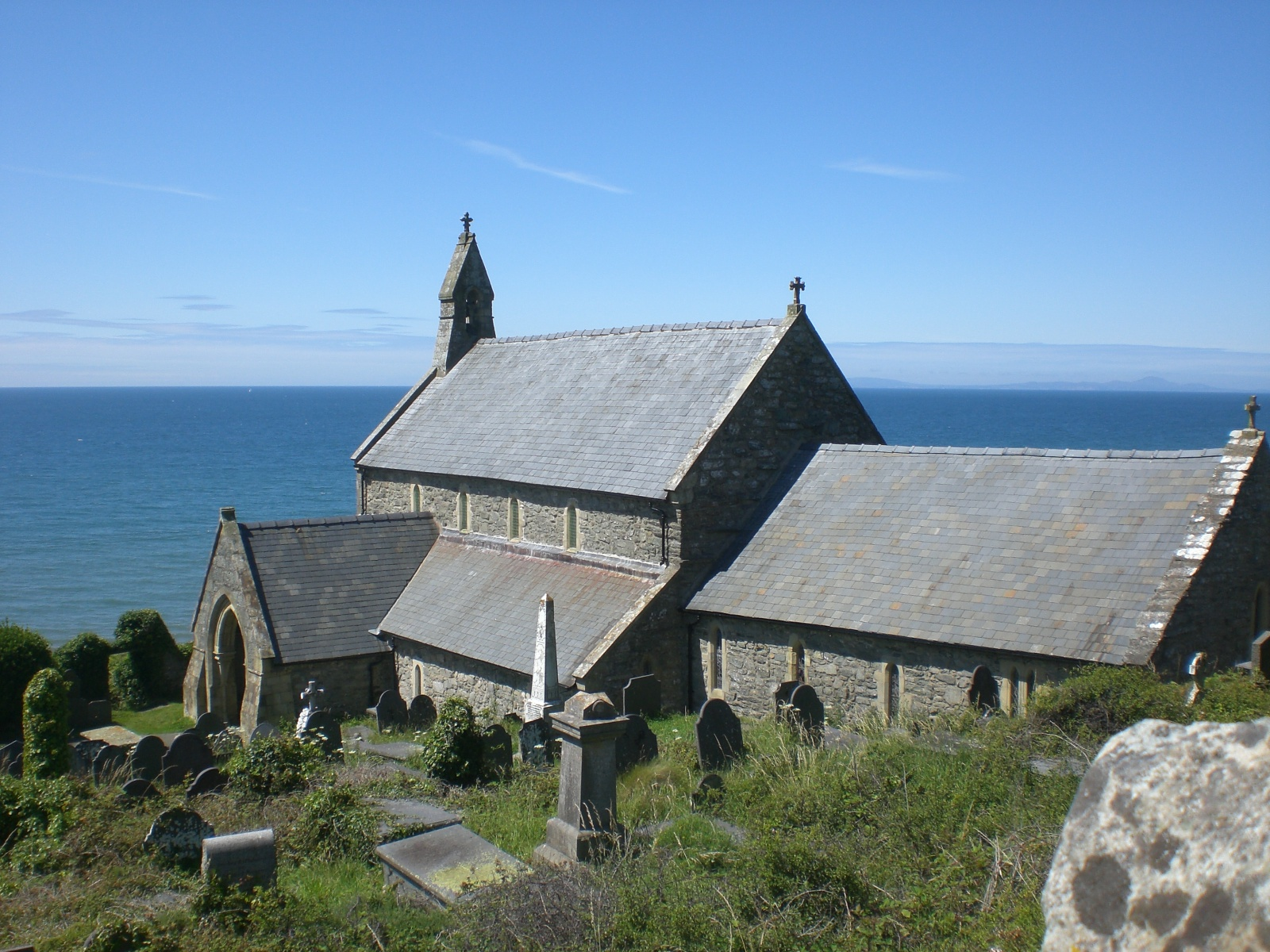
- St Mary and St Bodfan Church, Llanaber

- Location within Gwynedd
- OS grid reference: SH599178
- Community: Barmouth
- Principal area: Gwynedd
- Country: Wales
- Sovereign state: United Kingdom
- Post town: BARMOUTH
- Postcode district: LL42
- Dialling code: 01341
- Police: North Wales
- Fire: North Wales
- Ambulance: Welsh
- UK Parliament: Dwyfor Meirionnydd
- Senedd Cymru – Welsh Parliament: Dwyfor Meirionnydd

Llanaber is a linear coastal village in Gwynedd, north-west Wales, about 0.7 miles (1.1 km) north of Barmouth on the A496 road. The Irish Sea lies directly to the west and the Rhiniog mountains directly to the east.

== Facilities ==
Its main attraction is the large beach which is used for a range of recreational activities including horse riding, cycling, rounders, cricket and football. A protective promenade gives access to Barmouth town centre.

It is served by hourly bus services and Llanaber railway station on the Cambrian train line.

The village contains a number of rural holiday cottages, small hotels and holiday parks for caravan and camping during the summer.

== Church ==
Within the village is a 13th-century parish church and Grade I listed building, St Mary and St Bodfan Church.

The church was built in the early 13th century by Hywel ap Gruffudd ap Cynan, who was a great-grandson of Owain Gwynedd. It has a flagstone floor and a 16th-century timber roof.

It has undergone two major restorations. The first one was in 1860, when the small bell tower and most of the west wall were rebuilt. A small vestry was constructed on the north side of the chancel and stained glass windows were installed.

The second restoration was in 1969. The wood in the roof was treated or replaced, and the seating renewed, with spare pews given to St Mary's from the nearby St John's Church. A Compton organ of two manuals and pedalboard was also given to the church by the Bishop of Bangor, James Colquhoun Campbell.

== Gallery ==
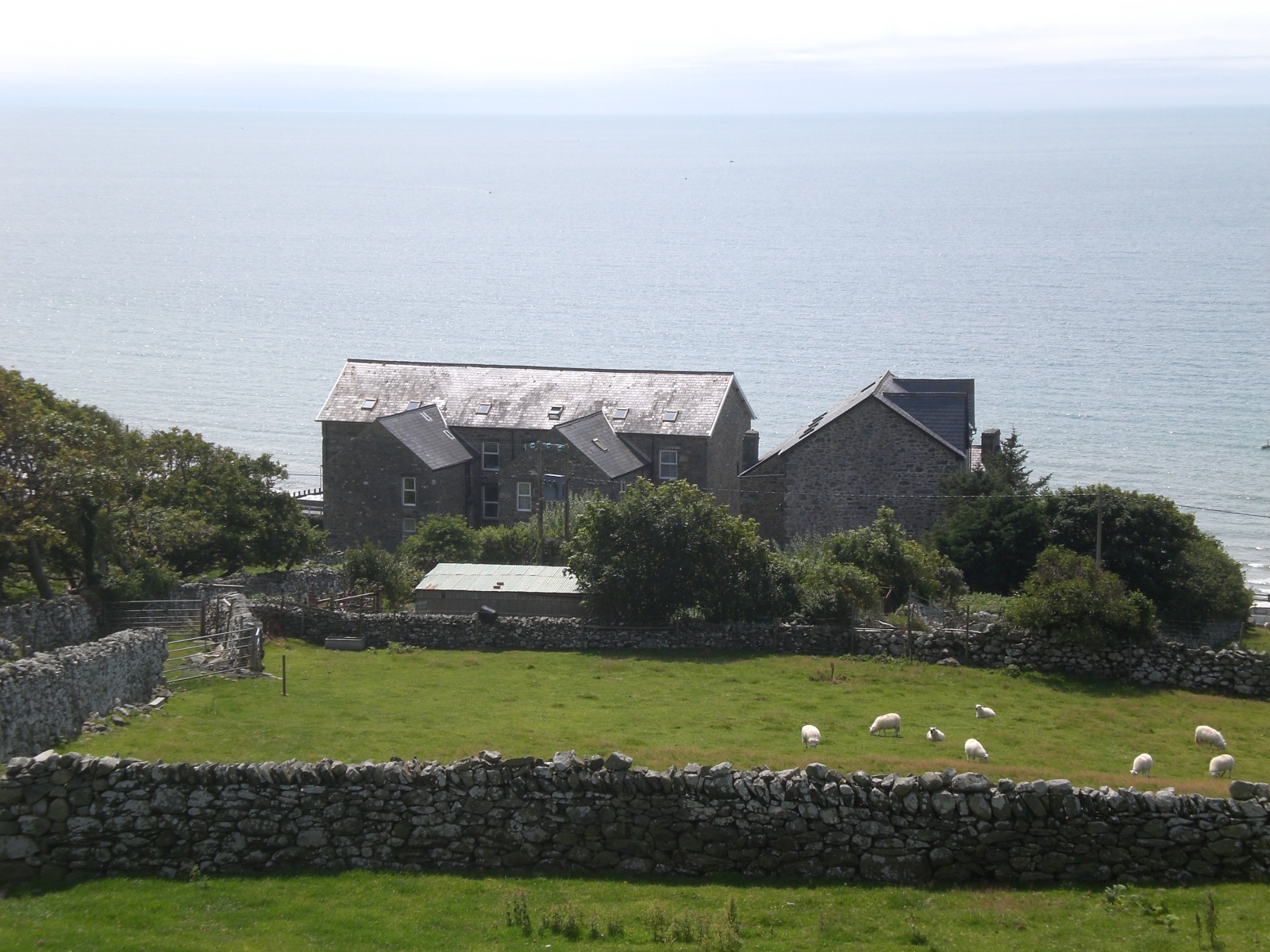
View overlooking Llanaber from nearby hill

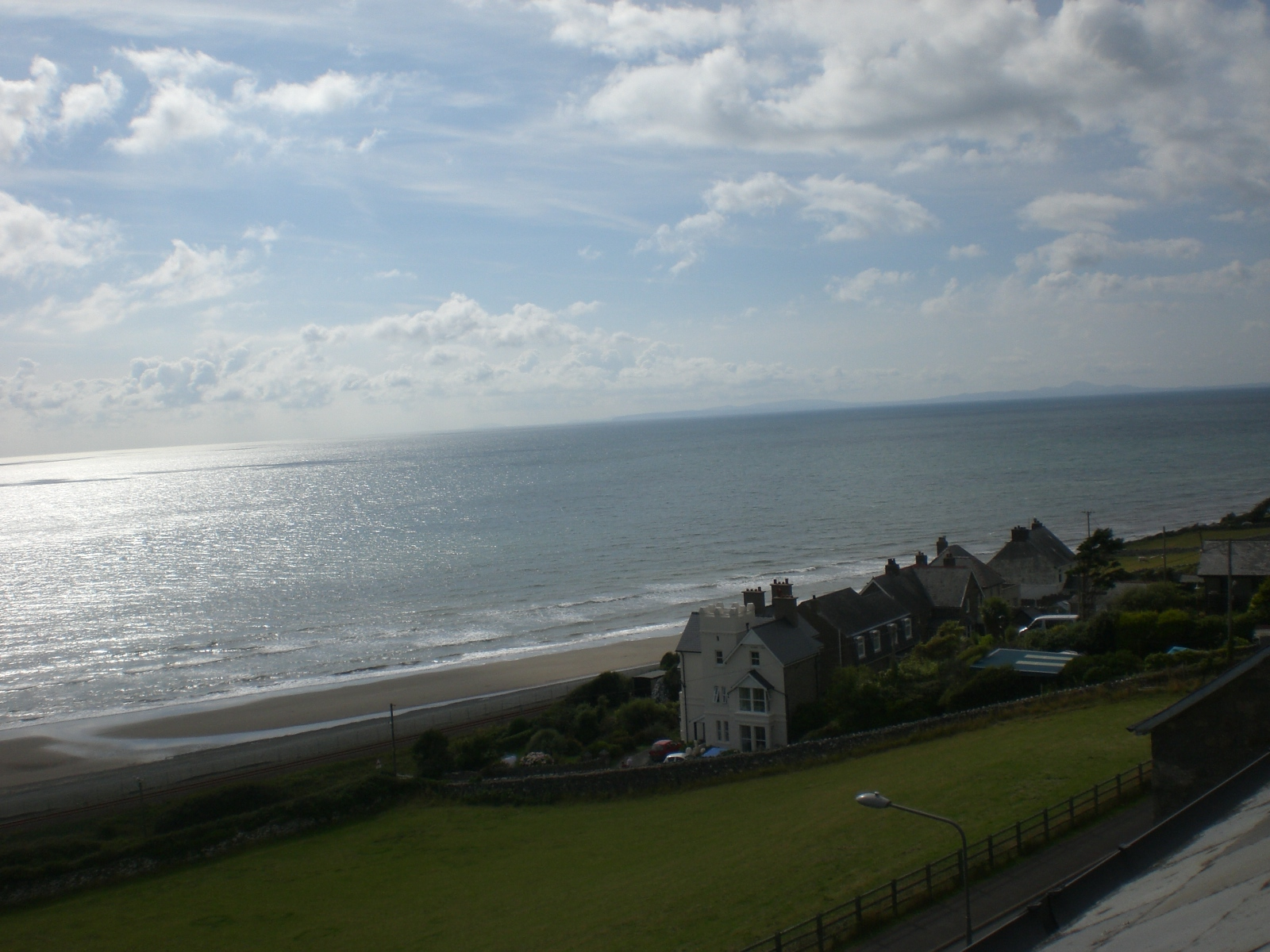
Llanaber coastline

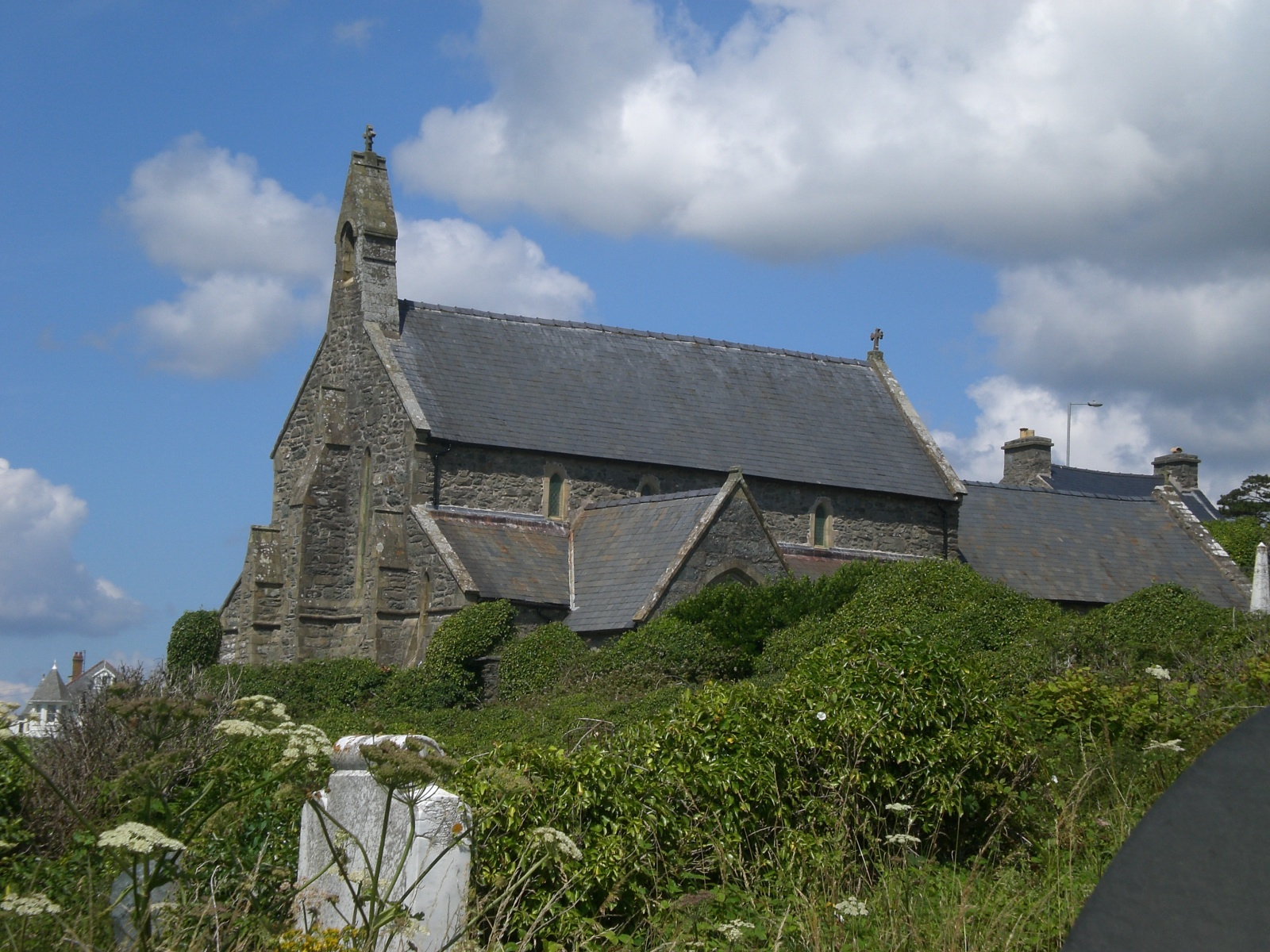
View of church the beach

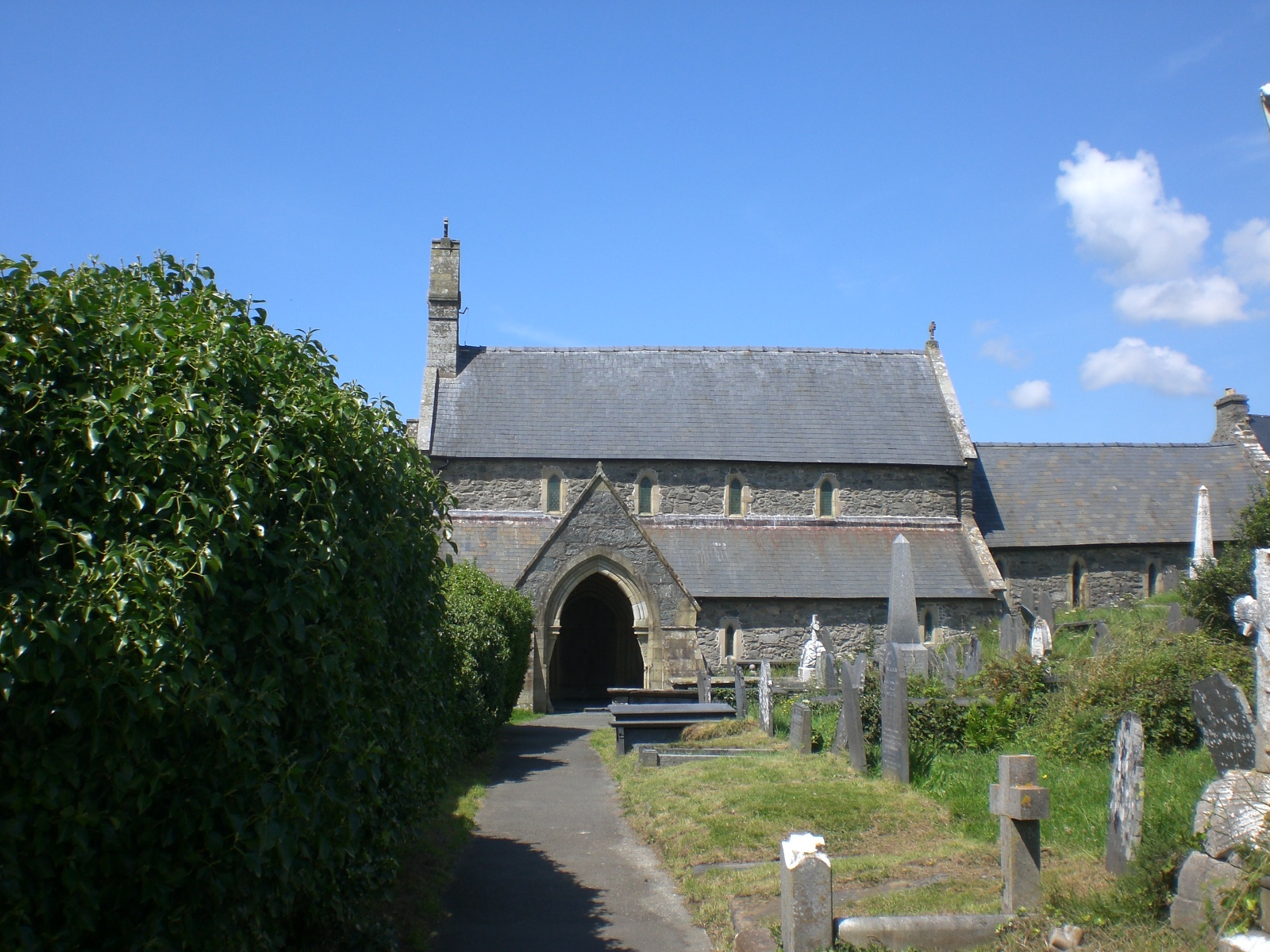
Church entrance
