= St David's Church, Barmouth =

Coordinates: 52.7199°N 4.0514°W

Church of Saint David
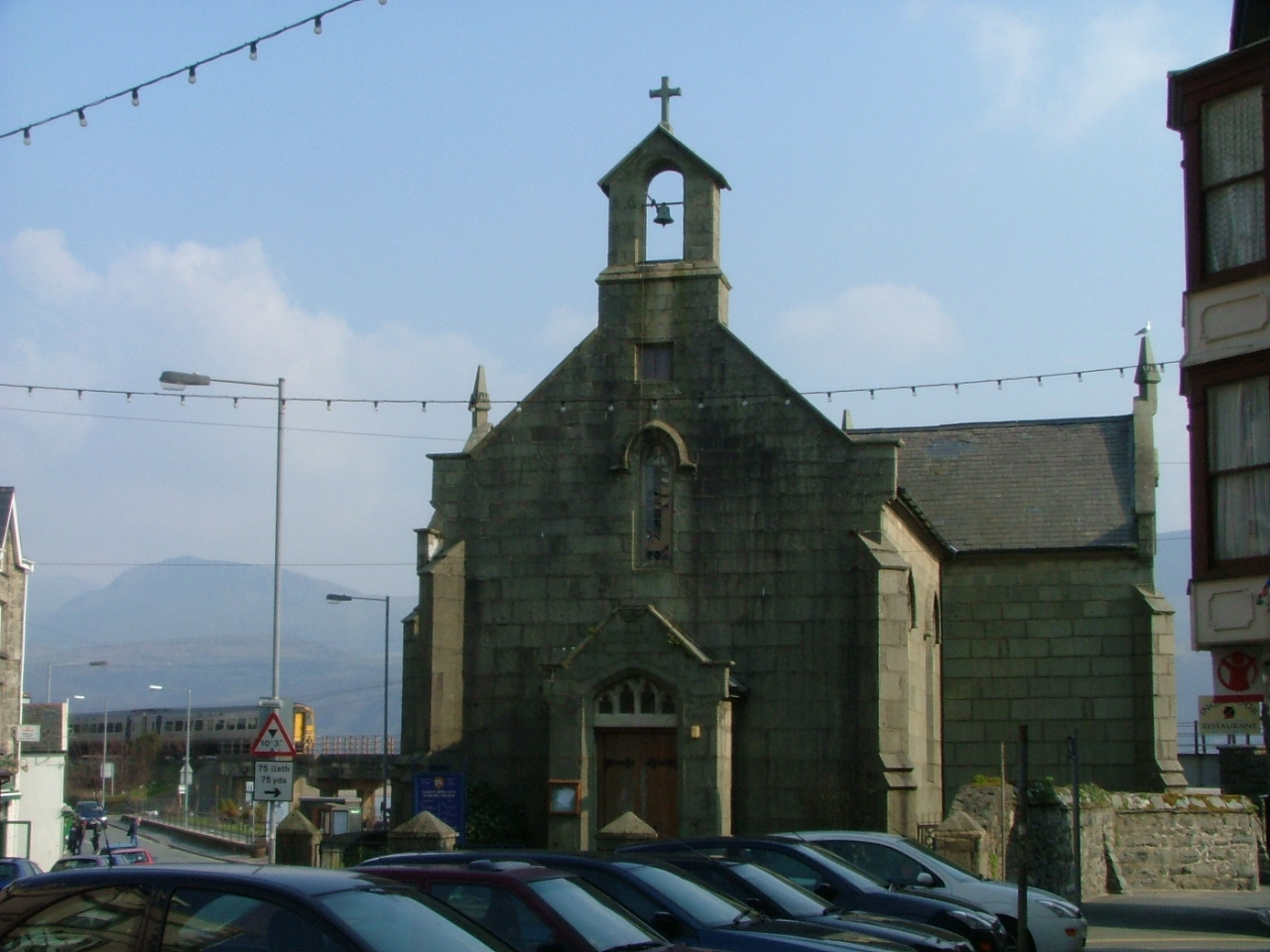
- Church entrance

- Location in Gwynedd
- Location: Barmouth, Gwynedd
- Country: Wales
- Denomination: Church in Wales
- Churchmanship: High Church

History
- Status: Active
- Founded: 1830
- Founder: Rev. T G Roberts
- Dedication: St David

Architecture
- Functional status: Chapel of ease
- Heritage designation: Grade II
- Designated: 4 February 1992
- Architect: Edward Haycock

Administration
- Diocese: Bangor
- Deanery: Meirionydd Synod
- Parish: Bro Ardudwy

Clergy
- Rector: Rev. Anthony Hodges

St David's Church is a Church in Wales church by the harbour of Barmouth, Gwynedd, west Wales. It is part of the Bro Ardudwy Ministry Area.

== History ==
=== Foundation ===
As late as 1824, the parish church, St Mary's, Llanaber was the only Anglican place of worship in the area. At that time, the numbers of tourists and visitors was increasing and the Rector, Rev. T G Roberts, saw the necessity of building a new church for the English worshippers. So, in 1824, he convened a vestry meeting of the Churchwardens and the most influential church people of the district to discuss the advisability of erecting a Chapel of Ease. It was resolved to apply to the Bishop of Bangor for his permission, but the bishop only gave his assent on the condition that the cost of the building should be defrayed by voluntary subscription. The rector accomplished this task having immediately commenced collecting necessary funds.

=== Construction ===
These efforts on behalf of the church were rewarded and on 4 December 1830 Reverend Roberts was able to submit a plan and particulars of the proposed sanctuary. The church designed by Edward Haycock of Shrewsbury is a neat Cruciform structure built in the later style of English architecture and contains accommodation for 470 people of which 230 places were to be free, in consideration of a grant of £300 from the Incorporated Society for Building and Repairing Churches and Chapels.

The church was built at the southern end of Barmouth, on a site that was formerly a ship building yard. At the time of the erection of the church there was a great deal of opposition to the site; the opposing faction contending that sand-drifts would make the approach practically inaccessible.

For some years after the erection of this church, sand-drifts did indeed prove a source of great annoyance to the worshippers. A resident of Barmouth, Mr Black (author of 'A Picturesque Tour') exclaimed that St David's Church was very badly situated. Over time, the effects of sand-drifts eased and then ceased altogether.

=== Support ===
Among the chief supporters of the Anglican church in Barmouth in the 1830s and 1840s were a family called Ricketts who lived in Aberamffa House now modernised into Orielton Hall. In 1845, the Rector received a magnificent silver Sacrament Cup with the inscription 'The Offering of M. A. Rth' from Mrs Ricketts. The donation was accompanied by the following letter:

"Dear Sir, Captain Barrow will deliver to you a case containing the Sacramental Cup which we were accustomed to lend to the Chapel at Barmouth, for the celebration of the Communion. It is my wish to make a gift of it in perpetuity and I shall be obliged to you to have it noted in the Parish Documents so that it belongs absolutely to the Church."

== Extensions ==
=== 19th century ===
As time progressed it became very desirous that alterations should be effected and at a vestry meeting held to discuss the matter on 25 November 1886, it was resolved to build a new vestry - to have a wooden floor, a new approach at the north east corner and to have sundry other small alterations made at a total cost not exceeding £100.

Further additions and alterations were made over the course of the coming decades. The current altar was built in 1880, a font formed of five stone centre columns, was donated by Margaret and Edmund Humphreys and family and was originally placed by the main entrance. Mr Alex R Gibbs of London created and installed a wonderful stained glass window at the east end behind the altar in the 1880s.

=== 20th century ===
During the 20th Century, a 2 manual Nicholson Organ was installed. It was done in 1910, when a new room was constructed to contain all of the new Organ's water pressure pumping equipment. In 1974, Lady Russon, the High Sheriff of Merionethshire, donated oil painting copies of cartoons drawn by Raphael depicting the lives of St Peter and St Paul. The originals are housed at the Victoria and Albert Museum in London.

== Services ==
From the time of its erection until the opening of St John's Church in 1895, English services were held in the morning and Welsh services at night. St David's is not currently open as a place of worship with all services taking place at St John's Church.

== Gallery ==
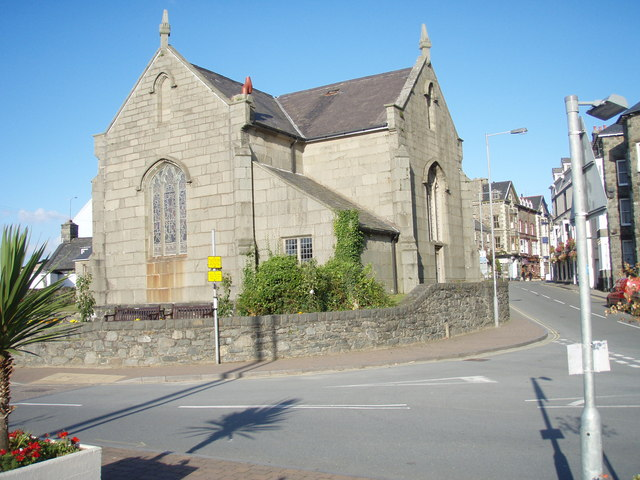
View from the corner of the road

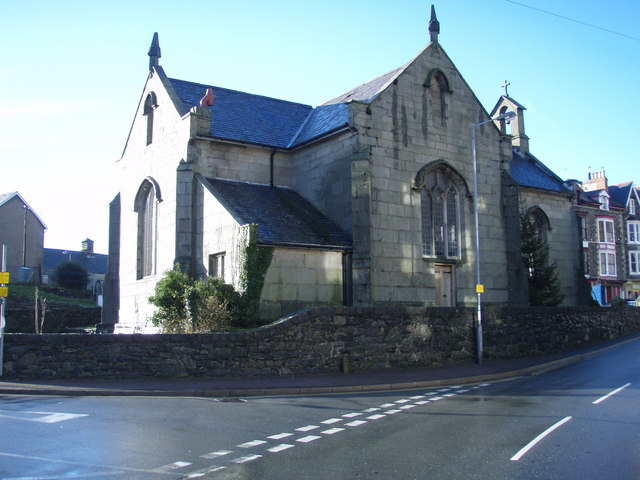
View from road junction

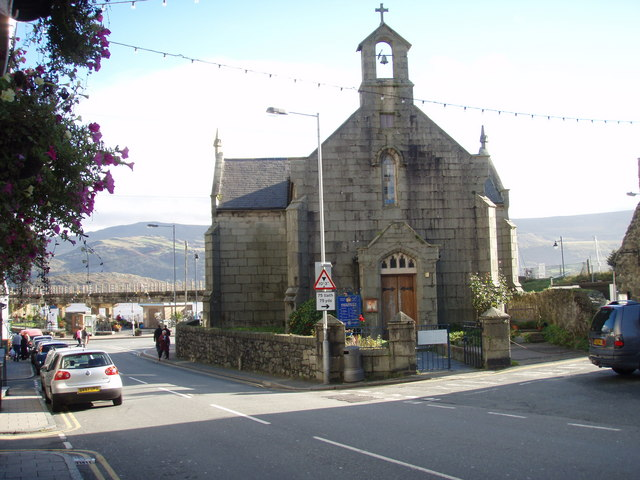
View from The Barmouth Hotel in High St.

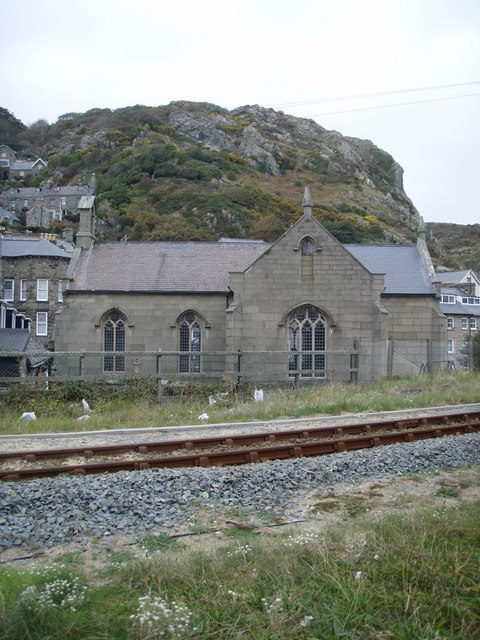
View from the west

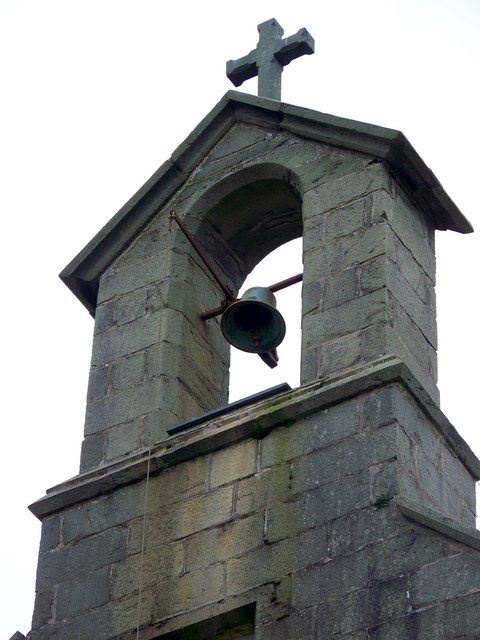
Bell cote

== See also ==
- Barmouth
- St John's Church, Barmouth
- St Mary and St Bodfan Church, Llanaber

== Sources ==
As of this edit, this article uses content from "Benefice of Llanaber with Barmouth and Caerdeon with Bontddu", which is licensed in a way that permits reuse under the Creative Commons Attribution-ShareAlike 3.0 Unported License, but not under the GFDL. All relevant terms must be followed.
