= St Mary and St Bodfan Church, Llanaber =

Coordinates: 52.7416°N 4.0763°W

St Mary's Church
- Church of Saint Mary and Saint Bodfan, Llanaber
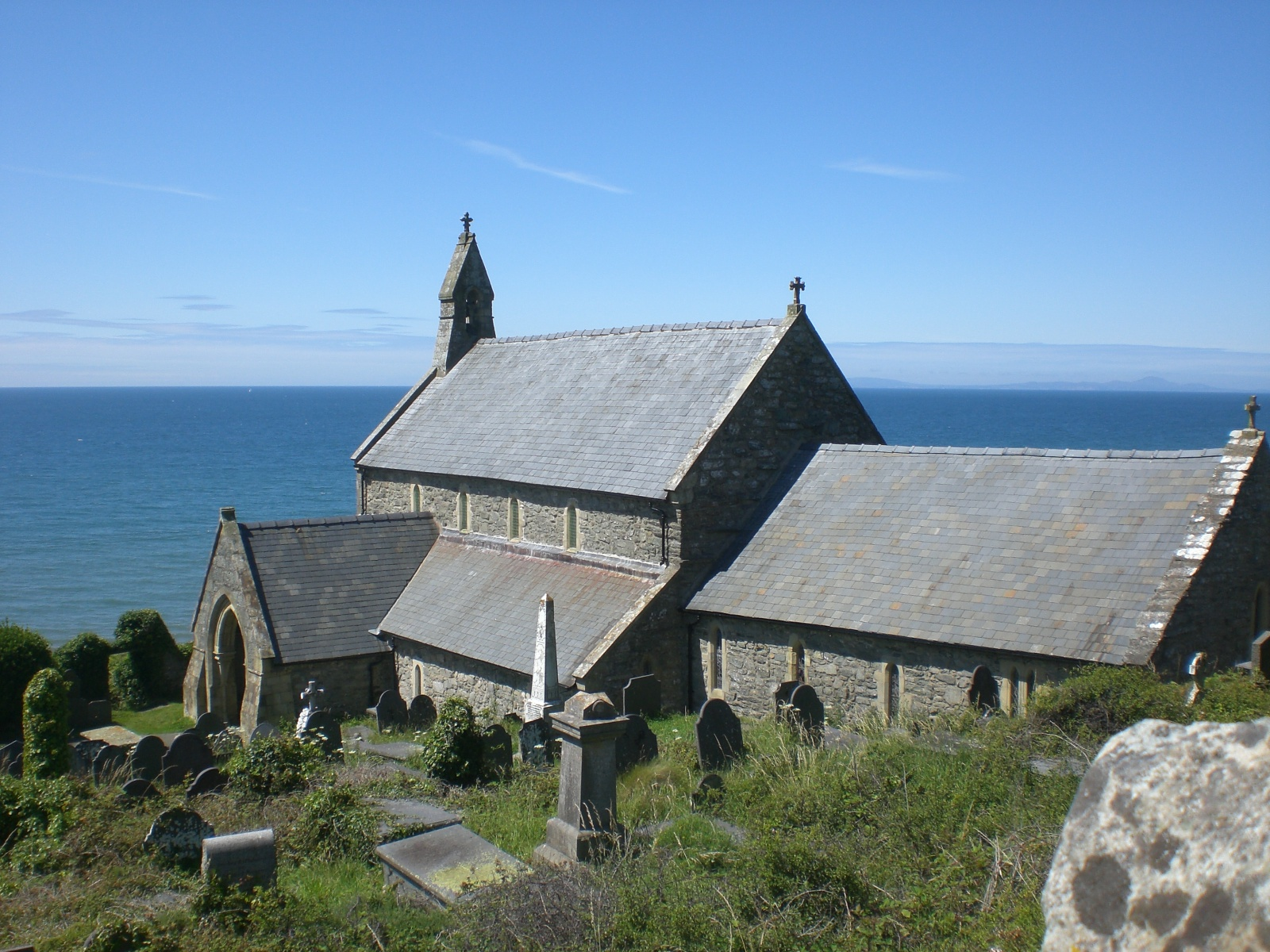
- View of the church from the beach

- Location in Gwynedd
- Location: Llanaber, Gwynedd
- Country: Wales
- Denomination: Church in Wales
- Churchmanship: High Church

History
- Status: Active
- Dedication: St Mary and St Bodfan

Architecture
- Functional status: Church building
- Heritage designation: Grade I
- Designated: 4 March 1951

Administration
- Diocese: Bangor
- Deanery: Meirionydd Synod
- Parish: Bro Ardudwy

Clergy
- Rector: Rev. Anthony Hodges

St Mary's Church or its full name St Mary and St Bodfan Church is a church located in the village of Llanaber in Wales. St Mary and Bodfan is a Grade I listed building, which despite substantial restoration work in 1860, is a well-preserved 13th-century building with lancet windows and arch-braced collar beams (16th-century) to the chancel roof.

Ancient maps refer to the church as St Bodfan's and an association with the saint is preserved in the name of the nearby Bodfan Farm, but the church is more popularly known as St Mary's.

== The current building ==
The present church dates from the early thirteenth century. One of its great benefactors was Hywel ap Meredydd ap Cynan, the Lord of Ardudwy, the commot which has given its name to the Rural Deanery of Ardudwy in which the Parish of Llanaber is situated. Hywel was a great grandson of Owain Gwynedd and a near relative of Llewelyn the Great.

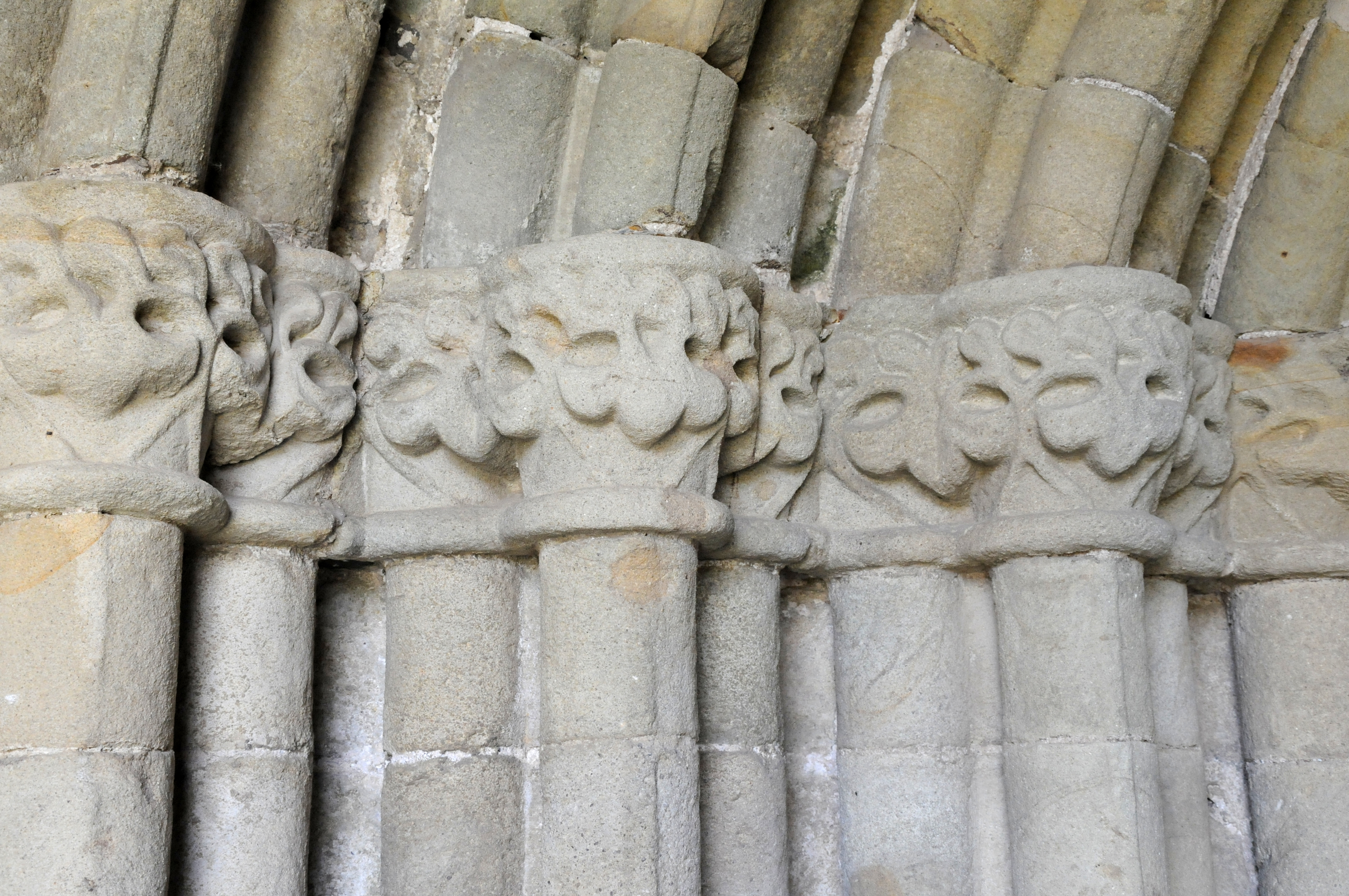
south porch

The plan of the church consists of a nave, with north and south aisles, and a long narrow chancel. Entering the church by the south porch, rebuilt in the nineteenth century, is the south doorway, a still-standing example of Early English architecture. This doorway, built of yellow sandstone, is deeply recessed and is composed of six shafts on either side. The north door opposite is much narrower and of simple design.

The nave is divided on either side into five arcades. They show the transition from Norman architecture to the Early English Style. The piers are Norman in character with foliated capitals from which spring pointed arches. The four clerestory windows on either side of the nave are examples of Early English lancets, whilst the two long lancets of the west wall are part of the nineteenth-century restoration.

The chancel, which is separated from the nave by an Early English arch, is approached by a flight of steps, necessitated by the sloping nature of the site on which the church is built. The east window is an example of a single Early English lancet with very wide splays and shafts in the inner arch.

The main roof timbers, both in the Nave and Chancel, date from the sixteenth century, whilst the ceiling above the sanctuary is panelled and its bosses and carvings picked out in gilt and colour.

The font is octagonal in shape. The bowl is modern and it stands on a very much older shaft.

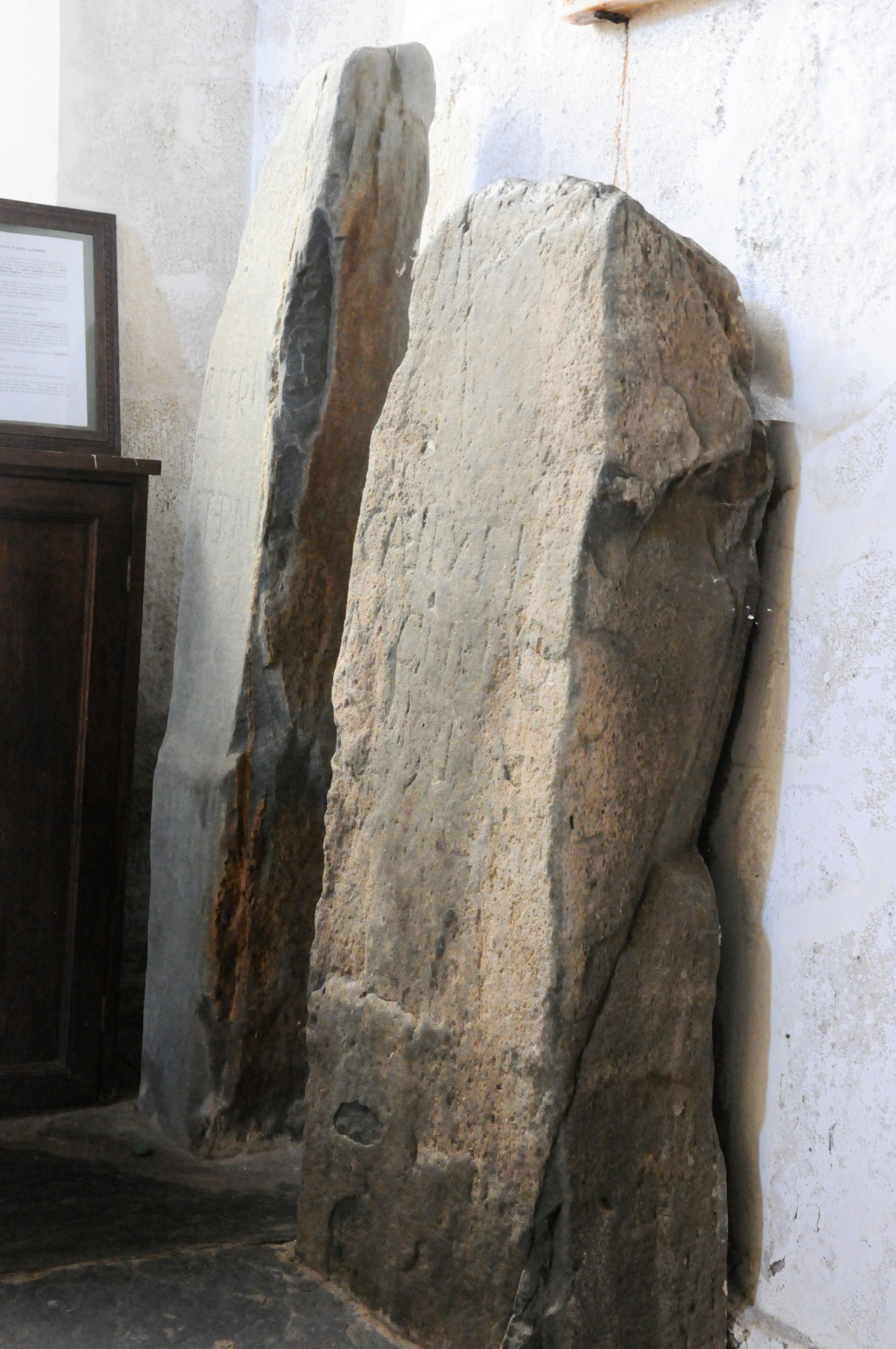
Calixtus Stones

=== The Calixtus Stones ===
In the north west corner of the church will be found two ancient stones. One is the Calixtus Stone, placed in the Church in the 19th century and having been previously used as a footbridge on a neighbouring farm. The inscription has been read as: CAELIXTUS MONEDO REGI, and is thought to mean Calixtus King of Mona.

=== Parish Registers ===
The parish registers date back to the year 1750. There are recorded relics in the church which comprise two wooden collection boxes with handles and dated 1756 and 1774 respectively, whilst near the south entrance may be seen an old church warden's chest, cut out of a single log of wood.

== Extensions ==
In 1860, extensive work of restoration was carried out. The bell turret was rebuilt as well as most of the west wall with its heavy buttresses. The small vestry adjoining the north side of the chancel was also constructed at the same time on the site of a previous building.

The glass in the windows dates from the latter part of the nineteenth century and is on the whole good with the design in the clerestory windows depicting angels with musical instruments. Most of the monuments date from the nineteenth century.

In 1969, the church was again extensively restored. The timbers of the roofs were treated against woodworm and new timbers inserted where necessary. The seating of the church was also renewed with surplus pews from St John's Church, Barmouth. The Compton Two Manual and Pedal Organ, a memorial gift, was dedicated by the Bishop of Bangor on 1 June 1969 (the eve of the feast of St Bodfan) at the time of the re-hallowing of the church after the restoration.

== Churchyard ==
The churchyard contains twelve Commonwealth war graves; from the First World War, six Royal Navy seamen (four of them unidentified), three Mercantile Marine seamen, a Royal Welsh Fusiliers officer and a Royal Engineers soldier, and from the Second, a Royal Artillery soldier.

== Gallery ==
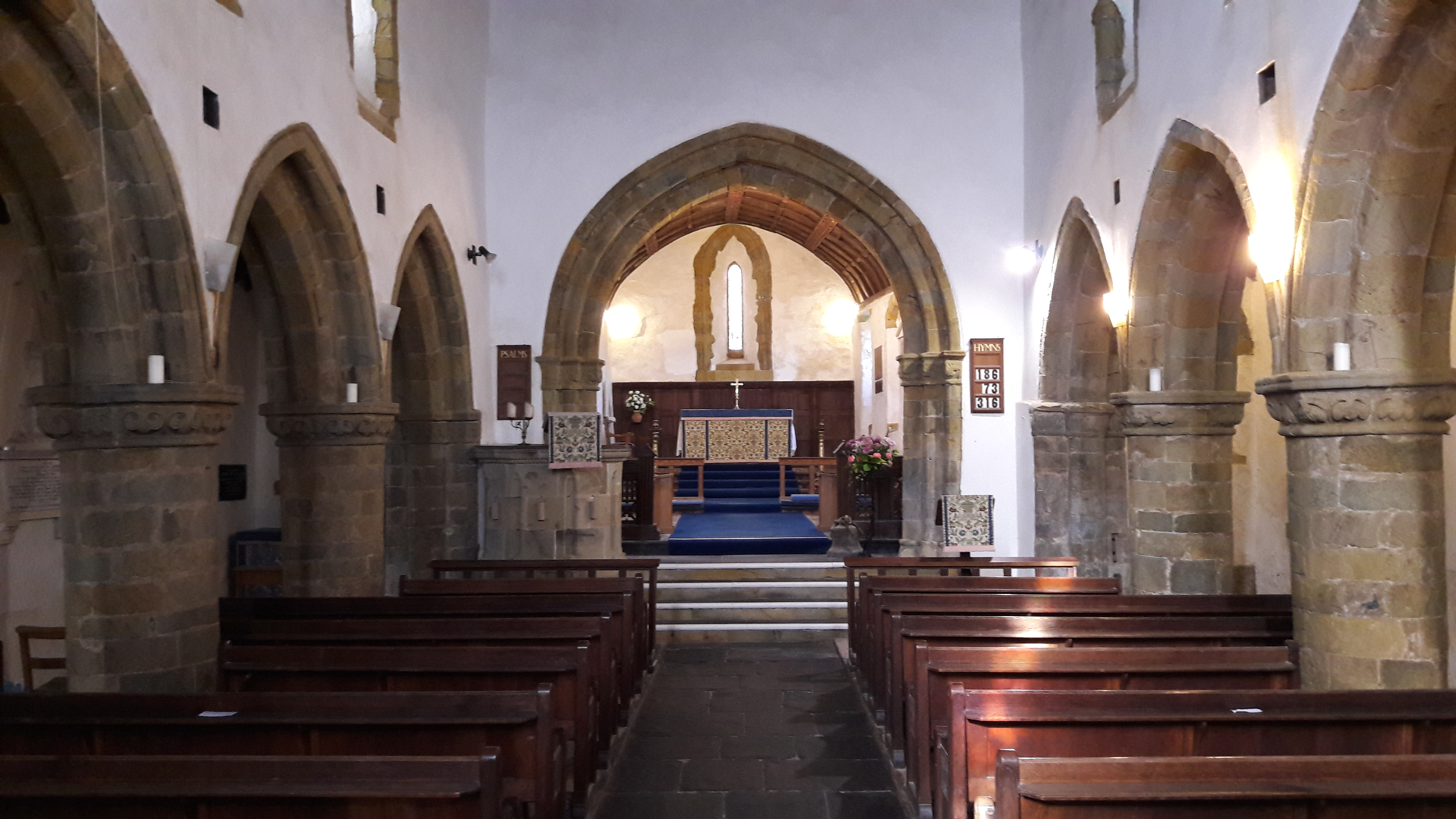
Church interior

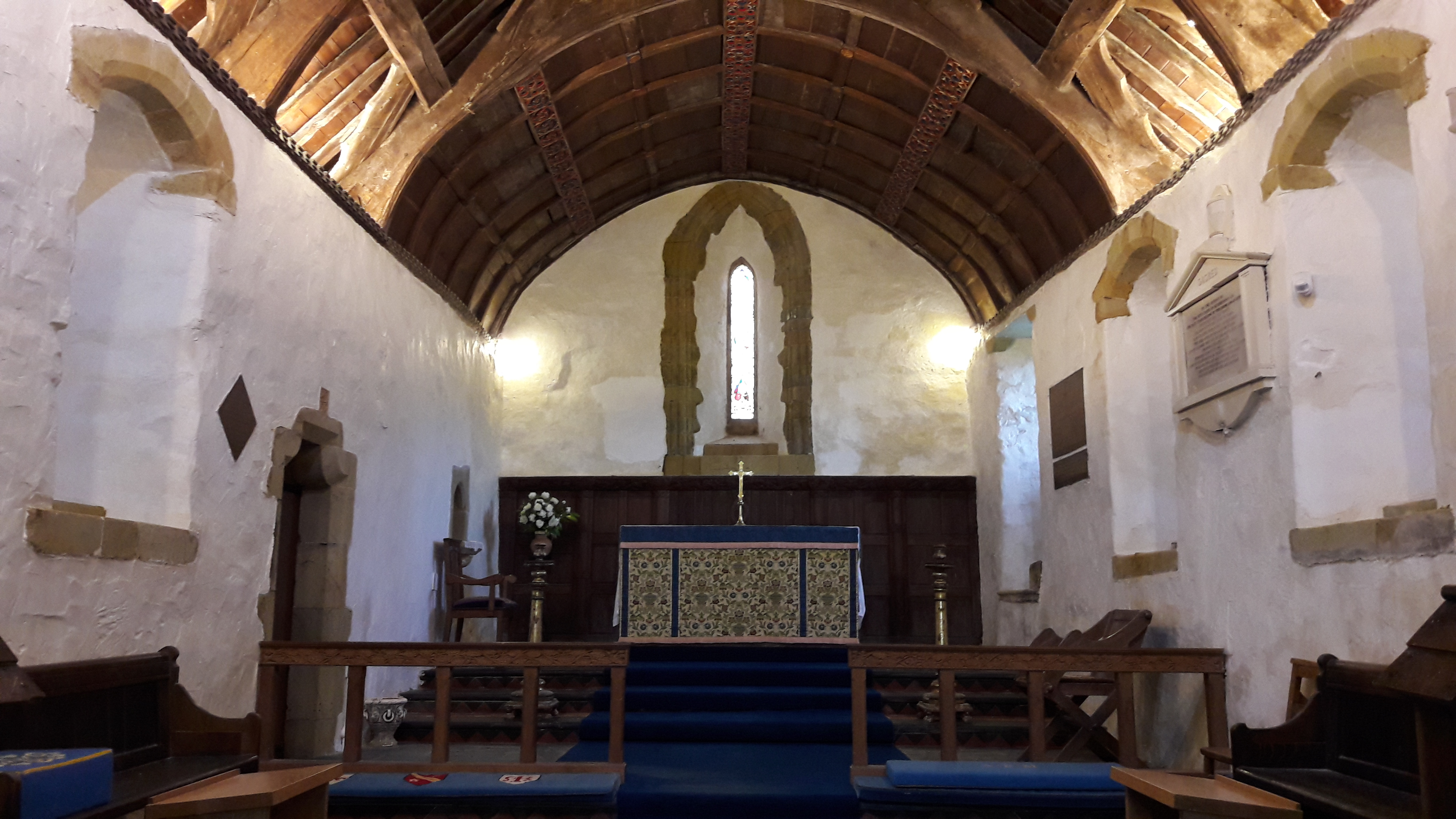
Church chancel

== See also ==
- Llanaber
- Barmouth
- St John's Church, Barmouth
- St David's Church, Barmouth

== Sources ==
As of this edit, this article uses content from "Benefice of Llanaber with Barmouth and Caerdeon with Bontddu", which is licensed in a way that permits reuse under the Creative Commons Attribution-ShareAlike 3.0 Unported License, but not under the GFDL. All relevant terms must be followed.
