= John Griffith (journalist) =

Welsh journalist

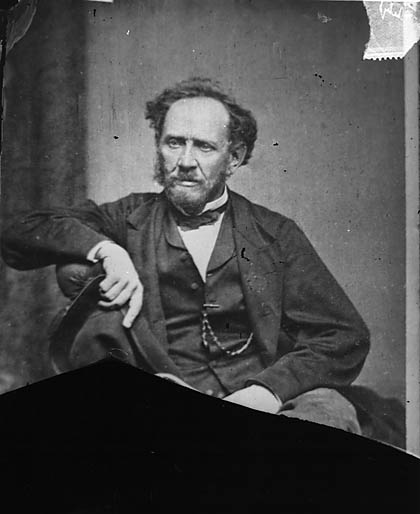
- Born: 16 December 1821; Barmouth, Wales
- Died: 13 December 1877 (aged 56); Liverpool, England

John Griffith (16 December 1821 - 13 December 1877) was a Welsh journalist based in London. He was known by his pen name "Y Gohebydd" (The Correspondent).

== Early life ==
John Griffith was born in Bodgwilym, Wales in 1821 to Griffith Griffith and Maria (née Roberts). He grew up in Barmouth, Merionethshire where he received an elementary education. Around 1836 he was apprenticed to William Owen; 'Grocer, Draper, and Druggist', with whom he remained until 1840. In 1847 Griffith was appointed to Sir Hugh Owen MP in connection with his work as secretary of the Welsh Education Society and went to live in London. They parted in 1849 and Griffith decided to remain in London where he opened a grocers, first in Greenwich and then in Walworth.

== Journalistic career ==
Griffith began contributing articles to the monthly Y Cronicl (The Chronicle) journal, established by his uncle Samuel Roberts (Llanbrynmair). He later joined the staff of Baner ac Amserau Cymru, the most popular Welsh-language newspaper at the time. He later became the London correspondent to the paper and wrote under the known at his pen name "Y Gohebydd" ("The Correspondent"). Like the paper's owner, Thomas Gee, Griffith was a keen libertarian and championed radical causes back in his homeland, including the defence of Nonconformist causes. He was one of those responsible for reviving the Honourable Society of Cymmrodorion in 1873. He also played his part in establishing the National Eisteddfod of Wales.

== Bibliography ==
- Davies, John; Jenkins, Nigel; Menna, Baines; Lynch, Peredur I.; et al., eds. (2008). The Welsh Academy Encyclopaedia of Wales. Cardiff: University of Wales Press. ISBN 978-0-7083-1953-6.
