= Tyn-y-Coed Farmhouse =

Farmhouse in Gwynedd, Wales

Coordinates: 52.7424°N 4.0021°W

Tyn-y-Coed Farmhouse is a Georgian farm house and grade II listed building in Caerdeon, Barmouth, Gwynedd, Wales. It was built in 1756 and later extended and altered in 1884. The property includes 8 bedrooms and 5 bathrooms; the outbuildings include a barn and an original horse stable. The house is surrounded by approximately 15 acres of land, with some trees dating back to the 16th century. The rubble-built farmhouse and slate roof was listed approximately in 1995.
