= St John's Church, Barmouth =

Church of Saint John the Evangelist
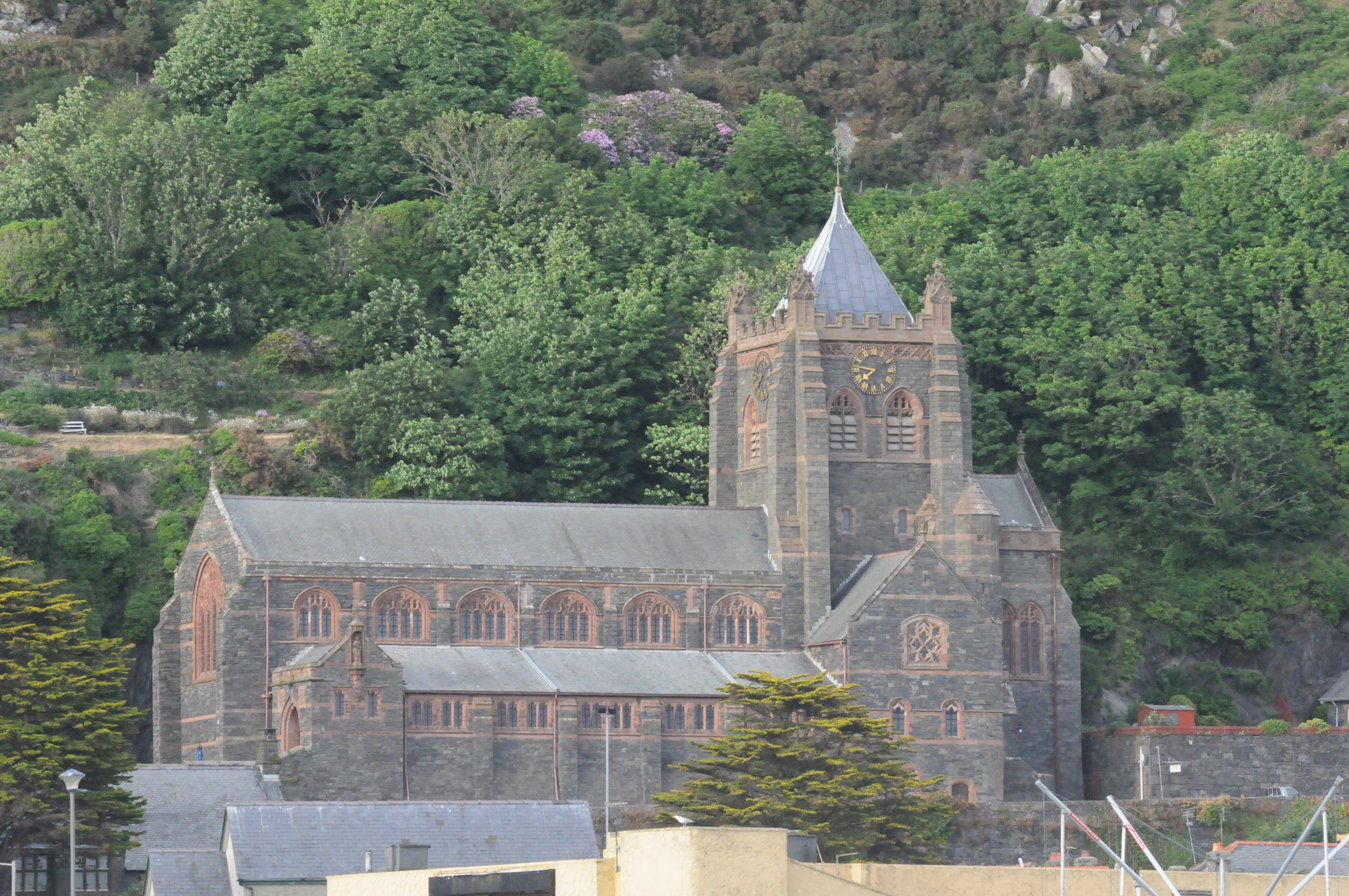
- Photo of St John's Church taken from Barmouth Beach
- Church of Saint John the Evangelist
- 52.7233°N 4.0548°W
- Denomination: Church in Wales
- Website: broardudwy.church/barmouth

History
- Status: Parish Church
- Founded: 1889
- Dedication: St John the Evangelist
- Consecrated: April 1895

Architecture
- Functional status: Active
- Heritage designation: II*
- Designated: 31 January 1995
- Architect(s): John Douglas & Daniel Fordham
- Style: Restrained Perpendicular
- Years built: 1889-1895
- Groundbreaking: August 1889
- Completed: April 1895
- Construction cost: £33,500

Specifications
- Capacity: 1,000 seated (reduced to 620)
- Materials: Local stone & Cheshire Sandstone

Administration
- Diocese: Bangor
- Deanery: Meirionydd Synod
- Parish: Bro Ardudwy

Clergy
- Rector: Rev. Anthony Hodges

St John's Church, Barmouth, Gwynedd, Wales was built between 1889 and 1895 and designed by the Chester architects Douglas and Fordham. The foundation stone was laid by Princess Beatrice of the United Kingdom. The bulk of the cost of construction was donated by Mrs Sarah Dyson Perrins in memory of her husband James Dyson Perrins (father of Charles William Dyson Perrins) of Lea & Perrins.

The church belongs to the Church in Wales. It is a grade II* listed building, and was given this status by Cadw on 31 January 1995. It is part of the Bro Ardudwy Ministry Area.

== History ==
In 1830, a new church was opened in Barmouth on the quayside dedicated to Saint David. This church was built to accommodate an increasing population since the ancient church in Llanaber is over 1 mile (1.6 km) away from the town centre.

During this period the railways had not reached this part of the Welsh coast, so Barmouth was still reliant on the maritime industry. This changed in the 1860s with the arrival of the railway resulting in a vast increase in the number of tourists.

Soon after Edward Hughes became rector of the parish of Llanaber and Barmouth in 1887 he realised that Barmouth needed a larger place of worship. Many trials were carried out in St David's to try and increase the seating capacity but these attempts proved fruitless. During 1887 Hughes proposed the idea of building a larger place of worship to the Churchwardens and the Parochial Church Council. They agreed and the work of finding a suitable location began.

With Barmouth's geographical location between the mountains and sea, building locations were limited. However a donation of a rocky precipice above the town was accepted as the final choice.

A design by architects Douglas and Fordham was chosen and fundraising efforts begun. An unexpected donation of £15,000 from Mrs Sarah Perrins, widow of James Dyson Perrins and mother of Charles William Dyson Perrins was gratefully received and provided funding for the chancel, central tower, lady chapel and vestry to be built as a memorial to her late husband. Mrs Sarah Perrins and her family owned a holiday home in Barmouth called Plas Mynach and would have been aware of the need to build a larger church.

St John's took seven years to build between the laying of the foundation stone in 1889 by Princess Beatrice of Battenberg to its consecration in November 1895 by Bishop Cambell of Bangor. There were some setbacks during the construction stages, most notably during the evening of September 11th 1891, on the same day that the local Catholic church, St Tudwal's was opened. During this stage the church was almost finished, the roofs had not yet been slated, the tower was almost completed. At some point during the evening the tower collapsed into the church destroying most of the un-slated roofs and most of the walls on the mountainside of the building. Douglas and Fordham blamed the collapse on blasting operations behind the church that were aimed at allowing more light into the building.

== Items of interest ==
=== Font ===
The font located at the back of the church is a free-copy of Danish sculptor Bertel Thorvaldsen's font in Copenhagen Cathedral and is sculpted out of pure marble.

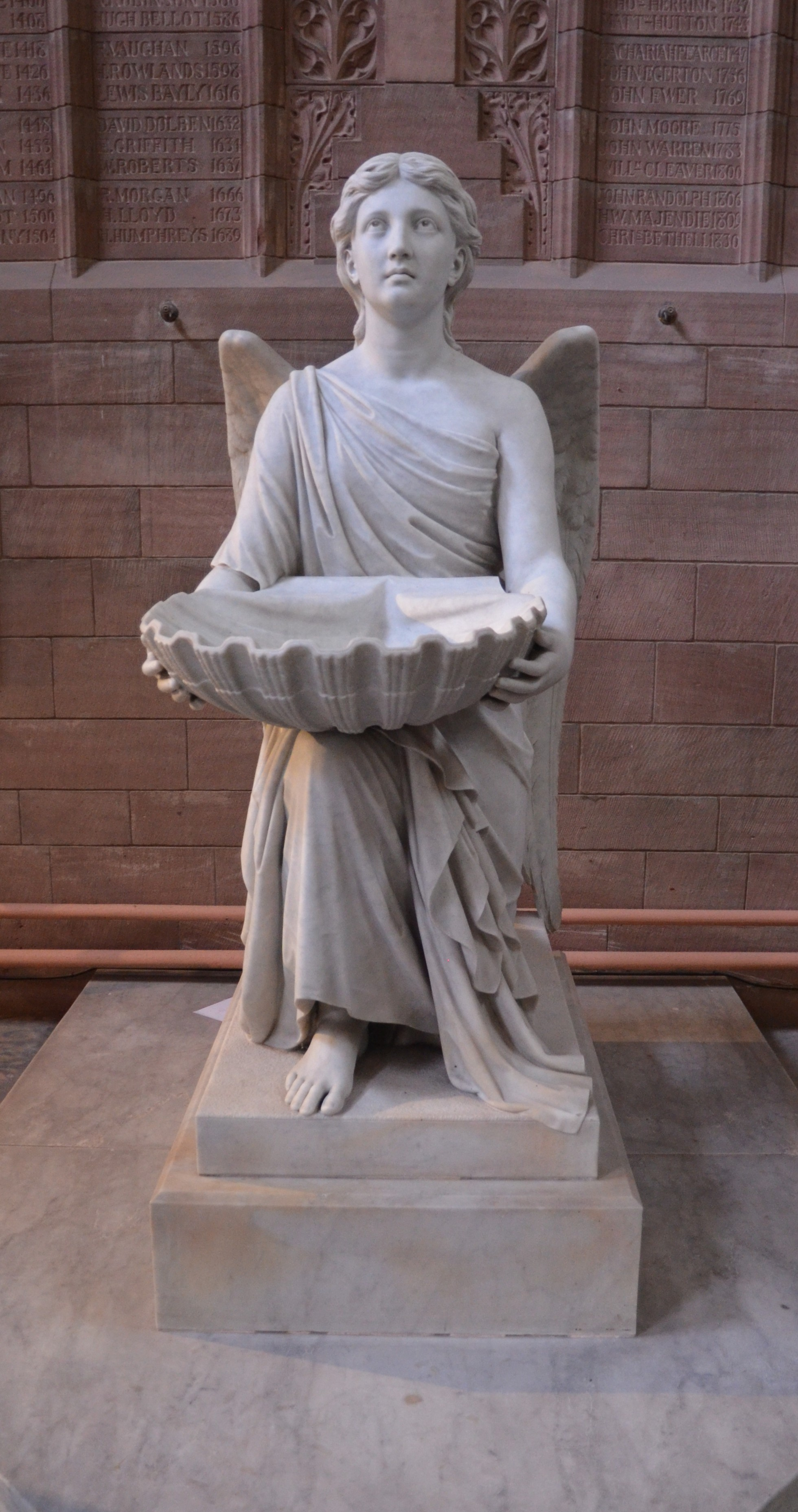
The church font

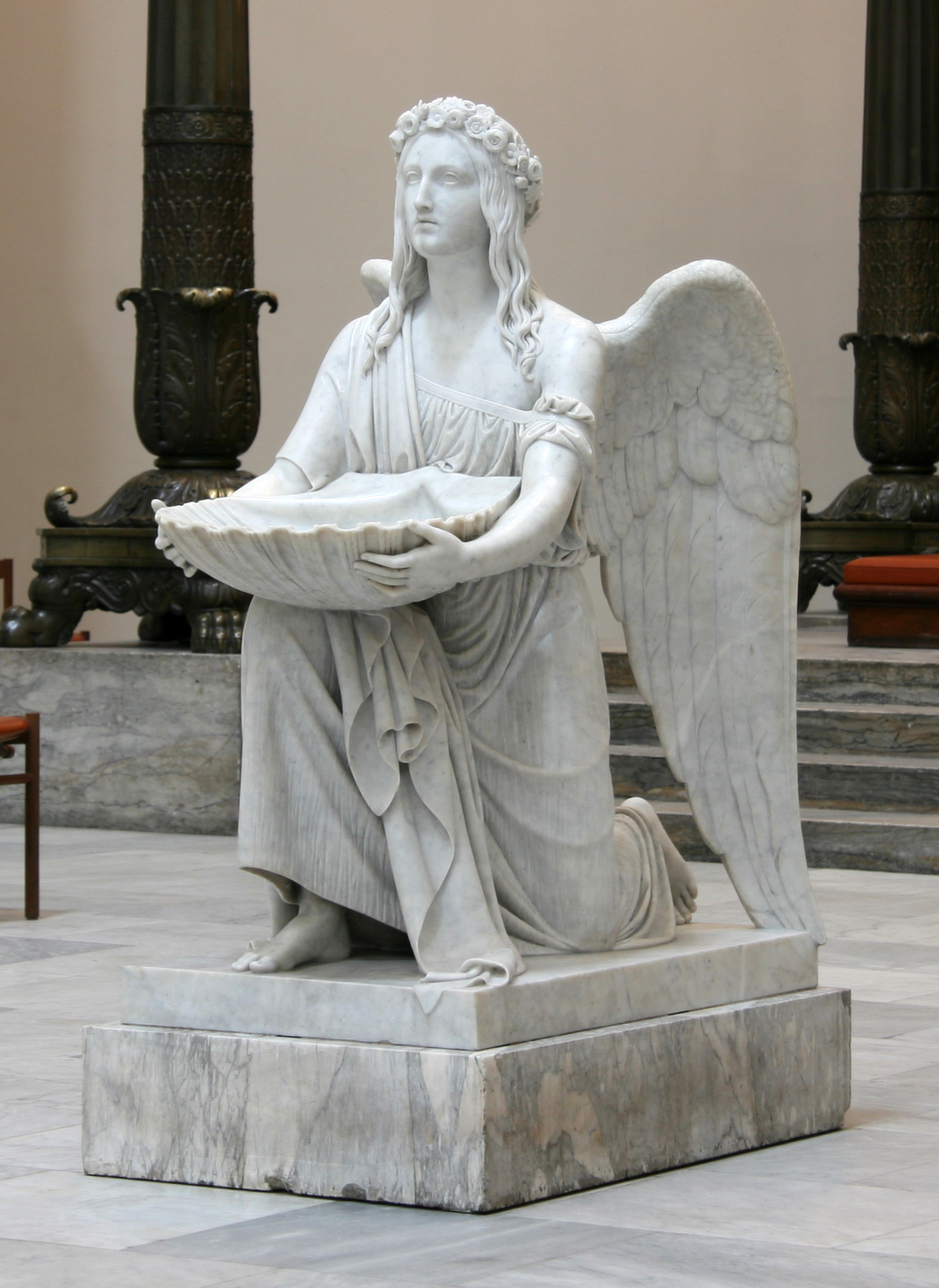
Thorwaldsen's Font in Copenhagen Cathedral

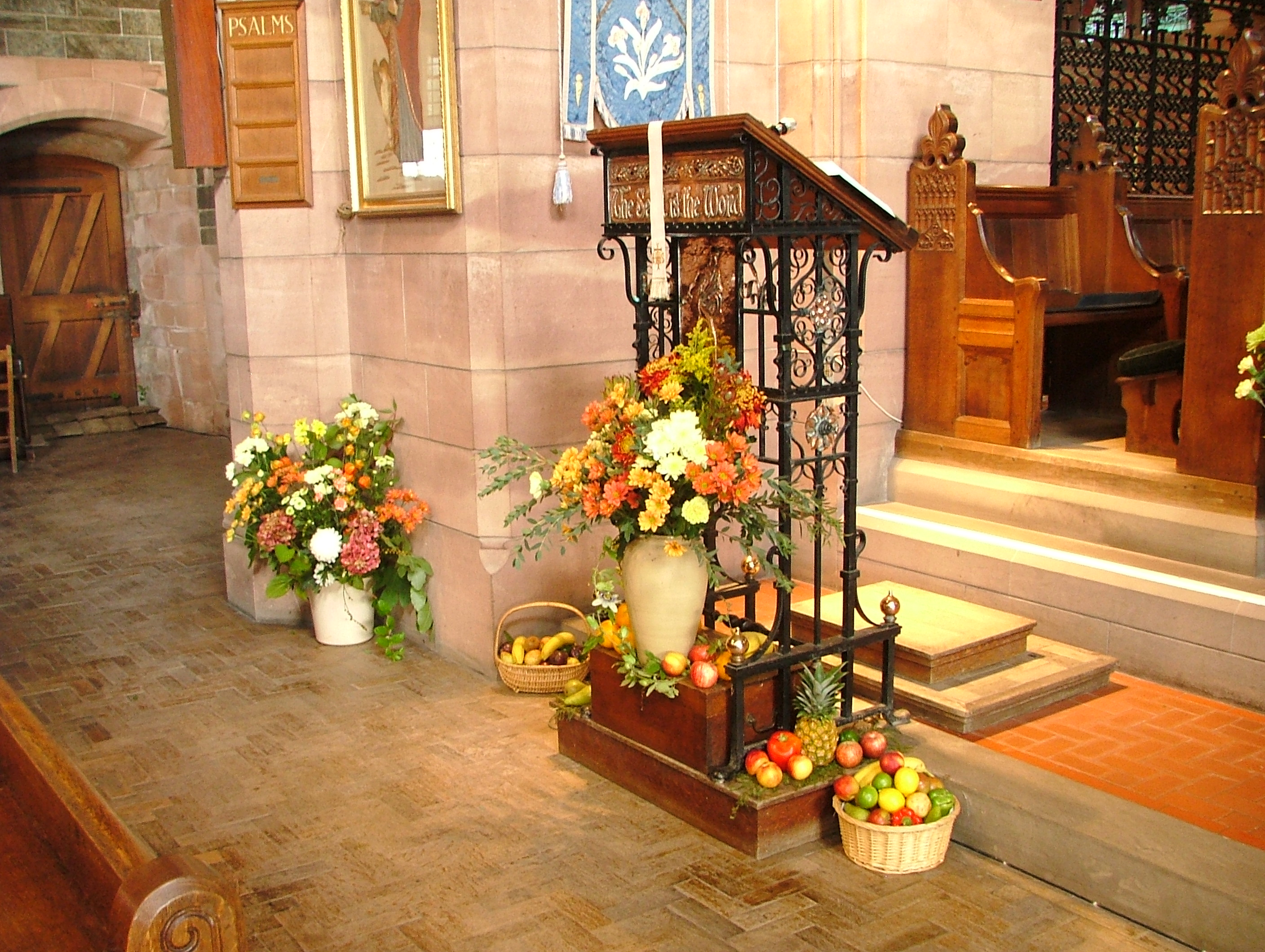
The lectern decorated for the 2007 Harvest Festival. "The Seed is the Word" on one of the copper plates can be made out

=== Lectern ===
The lectern was made in Frome. It is made of wrought iron and copper and represents the Sower and the Seed.

=== Bell tower ===
The tower contains 8 bells by Mear and Stainbank of Whitechapel in London. There is also a clock mechanism in the bell ringing chamber built in 1897, this mechanism also plays the Westminster Chimes using some of the eight bells.

=== Stained glass windows ===
St John's has nine stained glass windows by C. E. Kempe.

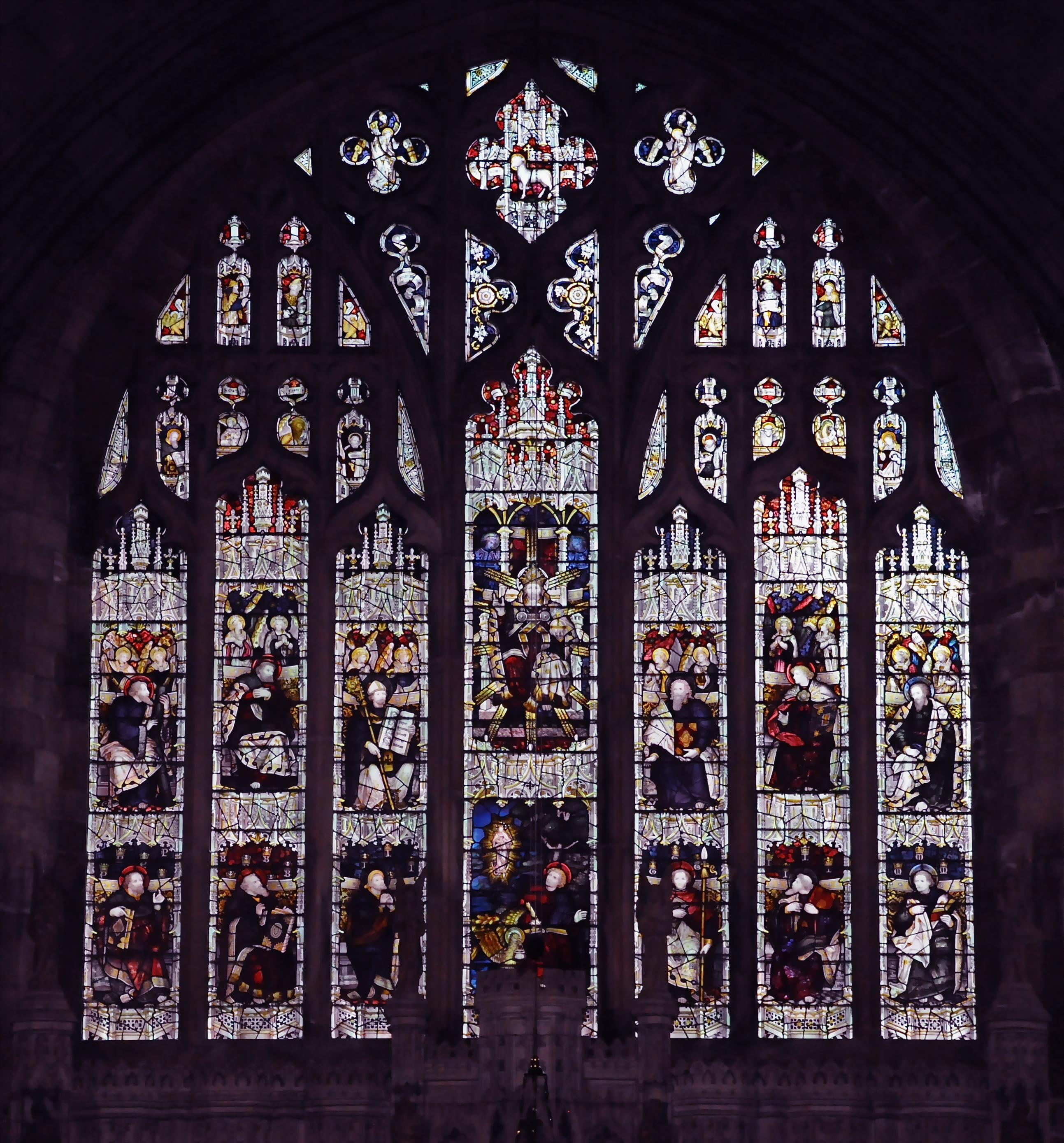
The East Window of St John's Church above the High Altar. The Window depicts Christ in His Majesty with his twelve Disciples and St John the Evangelist

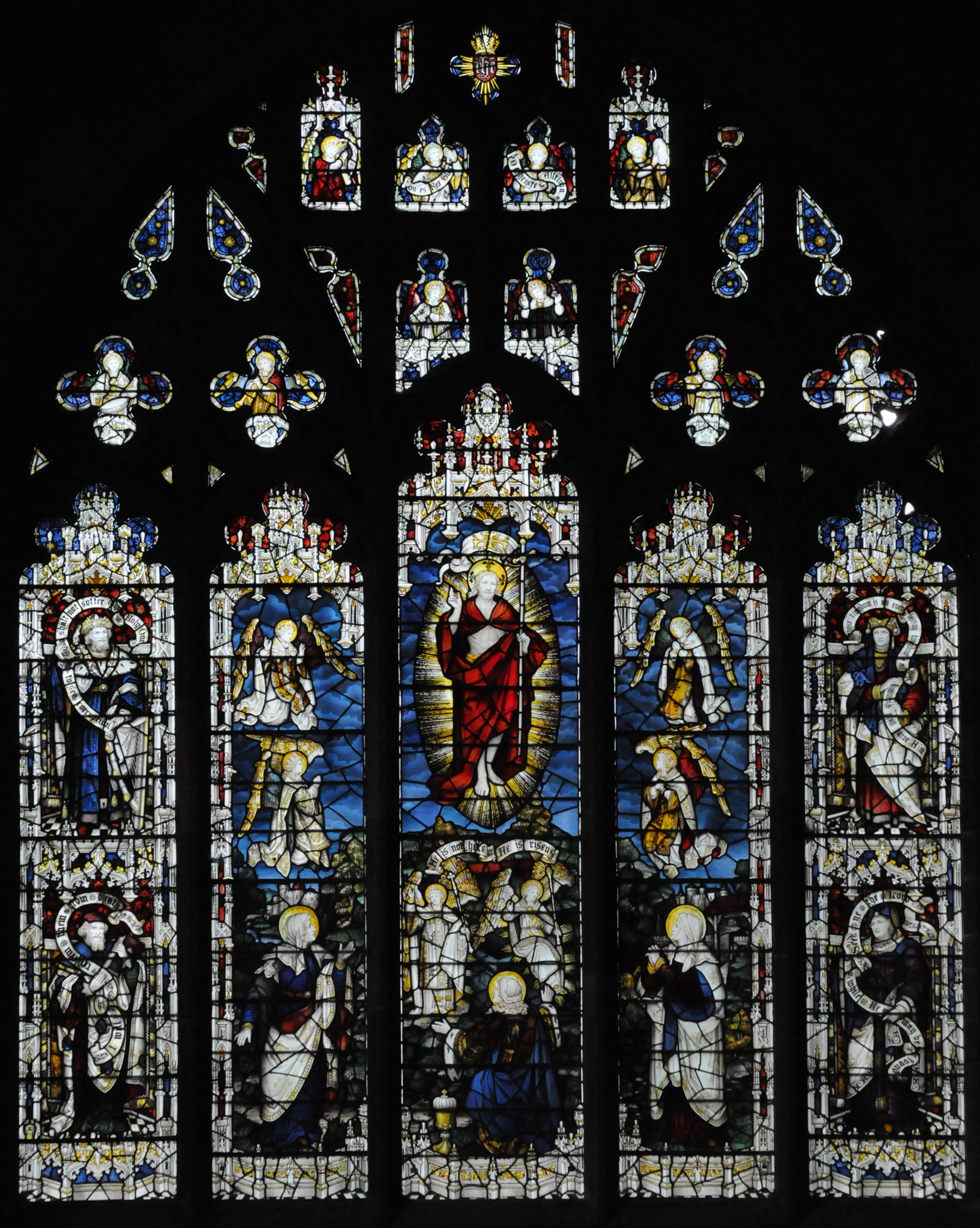
The West Window of St John's Church above the Font. The Window shows the Risen Christ and Angels.

The Main East Window shows Christ in His Majesty with disciples and St John the Evangelist. The West window depicts the Risen Christ with Angels. The side windows of the Sanctuary show various scenes of the resurrection: Easter Morning, Woman at the Tomb, Christ with Doubting Thomas and the Charge to St Peter. The three windows of the Lady Chapel show the Annunciation and the Nativity.

=== Organ ===
The architects' design incorporated a purpose built area for the organ. This makes all parts easily accessible without the need for large panels or pipework to be removed during tuning and maintenance. Funds were donated by Mrs Perrins' daughter Mrs Sarah Gertrude Potter. The family were from the Worcester area, and so Nicholson & Co of Worcester were a natural choice to build the instrument. The organ was transported to Barmouth by train.

It comprises three manuals and a pedal division, with a total of 34 stops.

Since it was installed in St Johns in 1895 the organ has not had a major overhaul and except for being cleaned in the 1970s and undergoing annual tuning and maintenance the only modification has been to incorporate a "Discus" electric blower system by Watkins and Watson in the basement sometime in the 1950s. The organ is in such an unaltered and original state that it can still be hand pumped by three volunteers when required.

Prior to 1895 organs in churches in the surrounding area were virtually unheard of. Dolgellau was the only church in the locality that had a barrel organ to accompany services. At the time of its construction, this organ was almost as big as the largest organ in North Wales which was located in Bangor Cathedral. It is still one of the largest in North Wales.

Over the following twenty years Nicholson & Co installed four other pipe organs in churches and chapels in Barmouth.

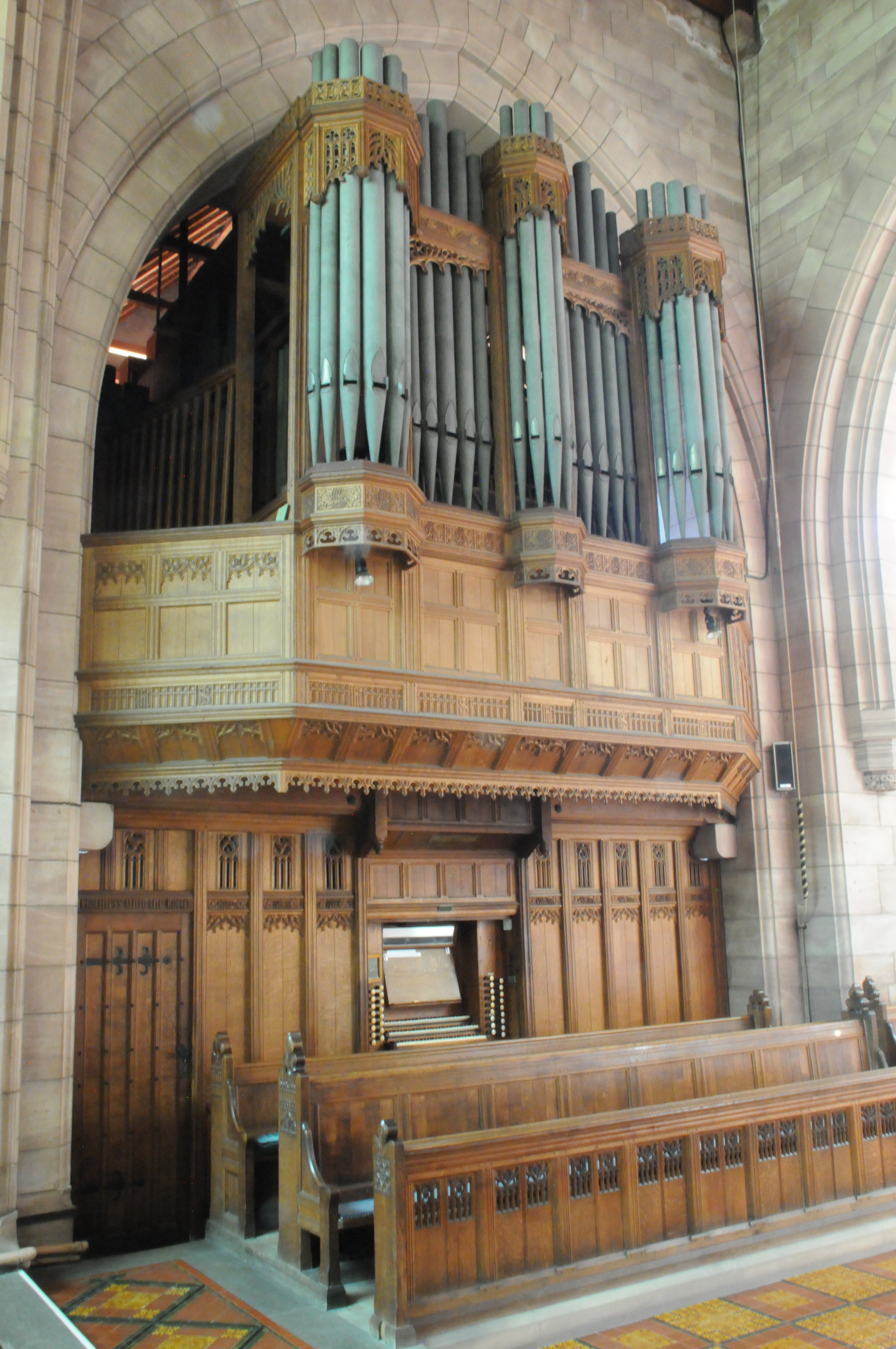
The Casework of the St John's Organ

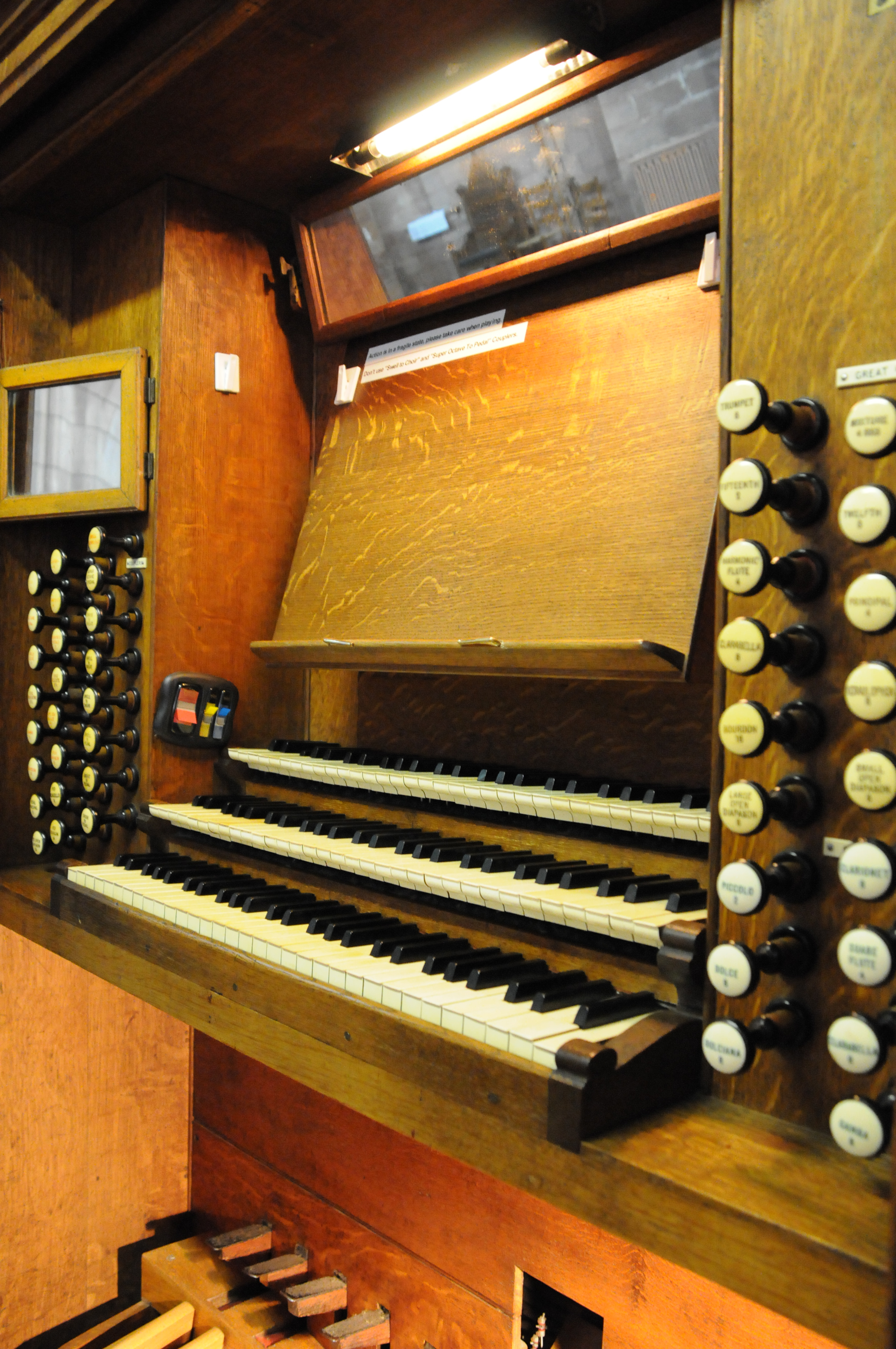
The three manual Console

== See also ==
- List of new churches by John Douglas
