= Bro Ardudwy =

Bro Ardudwy Ministry Area
- Bro Ardudwy logo
- Abbreviation: Bro Ardudwy
- Formation: 1 October 2011
- Type: Church in Wales Ministry Area
- Legal status: Registered charity 1146546
- Purpose: Worship God, Grow the Church, Love the World
- Headquarters: Dyffryn Ardudwy
- Location: Gwynedd, Wales
- Region served: Gwynedd
- Incumbent: Rev. Tony Hodges
- Parent organization: Church in Wales
- Affiliations: Diocese of Bangor
- Website: broardudwy.church

Bro Ardudwy is a Ministry Area of the Church in Wales which is part of the Diocese of Bangor. It is located within the Meirionydd Synod.

== Initial formation ==
Bro Ardudwy Uchaf was formed by a decree from the Bishop of Bangor on 1 October 2011. The decree dissolved the former Benefices and Parishes of:

- Harlech and Llanfair juxta Harlech
- Llanfihangel-y-Traethau and Llandecwyn
- LLanenddwyn (otherwise Dyffryn) with Llanddwywe
- Llanbedr with Llandanwg

The former Churches within Bro Ardudwy Uchaf were then raised to the status of Parish Churches within the area and consisted of:

- St Tanwg's Church, Harlech
- St Michael's Church, Ynys
- St Tecwyn's Church, Llandecwyn
- Christ Church, Talsarnau
- St Peter's Church, Llanbedr
- St Mary's Church, Llanfair
- St Tanwg's Church, Llandanwg
- St Enddwyn's Church, Dyffryn
- St Ddwywe's Church, Llanddwywe

The new Ministry Area was overseen by a Ministry Area Council that had the same powers as the former PCC's of the former Parishes.

== Enlargement ==
On 3 September 2015 the Bishop of Bangor signed another decree that formed Bro Ardudwy and removed the portion of 'Uchaf' from its name. The new area of Bro Ardudwy included all of the previous Churches but also included the Churches of the Benefice and Parishes of Llanaber with Barmouth and Caerdeon with Bontddu which were all raised to the status of Parish Churches. The Parishes of Llanaber with Barmouth and Caerdeon with Bontddu were disbanded at the same time as the decree that formed Bro Ardudwy.

The Churches that were added to Bro Ardudwy included:

- St Mary and St Bodfan Church, Llanaber
- St David's Church, Barmouth
- St John's Church, Barmouth
- St Philip's Church, Caerdeon

The Ministry Area Council was enlarged to include extra members from the extra Churches making up the extended area of Bro Ardudwy.

== Churches in the 2020s ==
In 2023, Bro Ardudwy parish includes the following churches;

- St David, Barmouth
- St Ddwywe, Talybont
- St John, Barmouth
- St Mary, Barmouth
- St Mary, Harlech
- St Michael, Ynys
- St Peter, Llanbedr
- St Tanwg, Harlech
- St Tanwg, Llandanwg
- St Tecwyn ( and Lychgate), Llandecwyn

== Administration ==
Bro Ardudwy is a registered charity run by a Ministry Area Council whose members are trustees of the Charity.
