= List of communities in Anglesey =

The communities of Anglesey in 2024.

The Isle of Anglesey is a county in the north-west of Wales. It is one of the 22 principal areas of Wales.

Communities are the lowest tier of local government in Wales. Unlike English counties, which often contain unparished areas, all Welsh principal areas are entirely divided into communities.

There are 40 communities in the Isle of Anglesey, with Llanddyfnan being the largest and Holyhead the most populated. All of them have a community council, with five calling themselves town councils in Amlwch, Beaumaris, Holyhead, Llangefni and Menai Bridge.

== List of communities in the Isle of Anglesey ==
Community		Population (2011)	Area (km^{2}, 2011)	Pre-1974 district	Remarks	Refs	Location map
English	Welsh	Population (2011)	Area (km^{2}, 2011)	Pre-1974 district	Remarks	Refs	Location map
Aberffraw	Aberffraw	620	29.54	Valley Rural District	Includes Tal-y-llyn.		
Amlwch	Amlwch	3,789	18.19	Amlwch Urban District	Town.		
Beaumaris	Biwmares	1,938	8.56	Beaumaris Borough	Town.		
Bodedern	Bodedern	1,051	19.32	Valley Rural District	Includes Llanllibio and Pen-llyn.		
Bodffordd	Bodffordd	960	25.3	Valley Rural District	Includes Bodwrog, Heneglwys and Trefor.		
Bodorgan	Bodorgan	921	25.25	Aethwy Rural District	Includes Bethel, Llangadwaladr and Malltraeth.		
Bryngwran	Bryngwran	894	16.92	Valley Rural District	Includes Capel Gwyn and Engedi.		
Cwm Cadnant	Cwm Cadnant	2,254	23.13	Aethwy Rural District	Includes Hen Bentref Llandegfan, Llandegfan and Llansadwrn.		
Cylch-y-Garn	Cylch-y-Garn	758	24.72	Twrcelyn and Valley Rural Districts	Includes Caerau, Cemlyn, Llanfair-yng-Nghornwy, Llanrhwydrys, Llanrhyddlad and Rhydwyn.		
Holyhead	Caergybi	11,431	6.69	Holyhead Urban District and Valley Rural District	Town.		
Llanbadrig	Cylch-y-Garn	1,357	13.73	Twrcelyn Rural District	Includes Cemaes.		
Llanddaniel Fab	Llanddaniel Fab	776	13.49	Aethwy Rural District			
Llanddona	Llanddona	691	13.49	Aethwy Rural District and Beaumaris Borough			
Llanddyfnan	Llanddyfnan	1,061	43.23	Twrcelyn Rural District	Includes Capel Coch, Llanfihangel Tre'r Beirdd, Llangwyllog, Maenaddwyn, Mynydd Bodafon and Talwrn.		
Llaneilian	Llaneilian	1,186	16.69	Twrcelyn Rural District	Includes Cerrig Man, Dulas, Gadfa, Nebo, Pengorffwysfa and Penysarn.		
Llaneugrad	Llaneugrad	254	11.41	Twrcelyn Rural District	Includes Marian-glas.		
Llanfachraeth	Llanfachraeth	589	8.44	Valley Rural District	Includes Llanfugail.		
Llanfaelog	Llanfaelog	1,758	12.11	Valley Rural District	Includes Bryn Du, Pencarnisiog and Rhosneigr.		
Llanfaethlu	Llanfaethlu	553	16.81	Valley Rural District	Includes Llanfwrog.		
Llanfair-Mathafarn-Eithaf	Llanfair-Mathafarn-Eithaf	3,382	15.13	Twrcelyn Rural District	Includes Benllech, Brynteg, Llanbedrgoch, Tyn-y-Gongl, and Red Wharf Bay.		
Llanfair Pwllgwyngyll	Llanfair Pwllgwyngyll	3,107	3.67	Aethwy Rural District			
Llanfair-yn-Neubwll	Llanfair-yn-Neubwll	1,874	16.06	Valley Rural District	Includes Caergeiliog and Llanfihangel yn Nhowyn.		
Llanfihangel Ysgeifiog	Llanfihangel Ysgeifiog	1,551	20.84	Aethwy Rural District	Includes Gaerwen and Pentre Berw.		
Llangefni	Llangefni	5,116	11.11	Llangefni Urban District	Town. Includes Rhosmeirch.		
Llangoed	Llangoed	1,229	9.26	Aethwy Rural District	Includes Caim, Glan-yr-afon and Penmon.		
Llangristiolus	Llangristiolus	1,357	25.41	Aethwy and Valley Rural Districts	Includes Rhostrehwfa.		
Llanidan	Llanidan	1,075	13.99	Aethwy Rural District	Includes Brynsiencyn.		
Llannerch-y-medd	Llannerch-y-medd	1,360	28.52	Twrcelyn and Valley Rural Districts			
Mechell	Mechell	1,293	23.52	Twrcelyn Rural District	Includes Bodewryd, Carreglefn, Llanfechell, Llanfflewyn, Mynydd Mechell, Rhosbeirio and Tregele.		
Menai Bridge	Porthaethwy	3,376	3.5	Menai Bridge Urban District	Town.		
Moelfre	Moelfre	1,064	13.9	Twrcelyn Rural District	Includes Brynrefail, Llanallgo and Mynydd Bodafon.		
Penmynydd	Penmynydd	465	13	Aethwy Rural District	Includes Castellior and Star.		
Pentraeth	Pentraeth	1,178	14.65	Aethwy Rural District			
Rhoscolyn	Rhoscolyn	542	9.25	Valley Rural District			
Rhosybol	Rhosybol	1,078	29.39	Twrcelyn Rural District	Includes Llandyfrydog, Rhosgoch, Penbol and Penygraigwen.		
Rhosyr	Rhosyr	2,226	40.47	Aethwy Rural District	Includes Dwyran, Llangeinwen, Llangaffo and Newborough.		
Trearddur	Trearddur	1,686	18.97	Valley Rural District	Includes Penrhosfeilw.		
Tref Alaw	Tref Alaw	581	35.42	Twrcelyn and Valley Rural Districts	Includes Elim, Llanbabo, Llanddeusant, Llantrisant and Llechgynfarwy.		
Trewalchmai	Trewalchmai	1,009	6.75	Valley Rural District			
Valley	Y Fali	2,361	8.71	Valley Rural District	Includes Llanynghenedl and part of Four Mile Bridge.		
