= List of windmills in Anglesey =

This is a list of windmills in Anglesey, Wales.

== Locations ==
There were 49 windmills in Anglesey.

Location	Name of mill and grid reference	Type	Maps	First mention or built	Last mention or demise	Photograph
Amlwch	Melin Adda; SH 440 921	Tower		1790s	Anglesey History - Windmills; Anglesey Windmills	
Amlwch	Melin y Borth; SH 448 935	tower		1816	Anglesey History - Windmills; Anglesey Windmills	
Amlwch	Melin Mynydd Parys; SH 444 906	Tower		1878	Anglesey History - Windmills; Anglesey Windmills	
Amlwch	Melin Eilian; SH 449 913			1850	Anglesey Windmills	
Bodffordd	Melin Frogwy; SH 426 773	Tower		Early 19th century	Anglesey History - Windmills; Anglesey Windmills	
Bodffordd	Melin Manaw; SH 359 795	Tower			Anglesey History - Windmills; Anglesey Windmills	
Bodffordd	Melin Newydd; SH 390 803	Tower		1833	Anglesey History - Windmills; Anglesey Windmills	
Bodorgan	Melin Hermon; SH 390 690	Tower		1743	Anglesey History - Windmills; Anglesey Windmills	
Capel Coch	Melin Llidiart; SH 457 820	Tower		Mid-18th century	Anglesey History - Windmills; Anglesey Windmills	
Carmel	Melin Geirn; SH 382 818	Tower		1873	Anglesey History - Windmills; Anglesey Windmills	
Cylch-y-Garn	Melin Drylliau; SH 305 887	Tower		Early 19th century	Anglesey History - Windmills; Anglesey Windmills	
Elim	Melin Hywel; SH 3507 8447					
Gaerwen	Melin Maengwyn; SH 485 720	Tower		1802	Anglesey History - Windmills; Anglesey Windmills	
Gaerwen	Melin Sguthan; Union Mill; SH 478 722	Tower			Anglesey History - Windmills; Anglesey Windmills	
Gwalchmai	Melin Gwlachmai; SH 385 759	Tower		Early 19th century	Anglesey History - Windmills; Anglesey Windmills	
Holyhead (Caergybi)	Melin Yr Ogaf; St. George's Mill; SH 248 811	Tower		1825	Anglesey History - Windmills; Anglesey Windmills	
Holyhead (Caergybi)	Melin Tan y Refail; SH 248 816				Anglesey Windmills	
Llanbadrig	Melin Cemaes; SH 365 925	Tower		1828	Anglesey History - Windmills; Anglesey Windmills	
Llanbedrgoch	Melin Llanddyfnan; SH 484 796	Tower		Before 1746	Anglesey History - Windmills; Anglesey Windmills	
Llanbedrgoch	Melin Pen y Bellaf; SH 484 787	Tower				
Llanddeusant	Melin Llynon; SH 3405 8523	Tower		1776	Anglesey History - Windmills; Anglesey Windmills	
Llandegfan	Twr y Felin; SH 5661 7401	Tower		1820s	Anglesey History - Windmills; Anglesey Windmills	
Llanerch-y-medd	Melin Gallt y Benddu; SH 426 838	Tower		1737	Anglesey History - Windmills; Anglesey Windmills	
Llanfaelog	Melin Maelgwyn; Melin Uchaf; SH 342 728	Tower		1789	Anglesey History - Windmills; Anglesey Windmills	
Llanfaelog	Melin y Bont; Melin Isaf; SH 3457 7255	Tower		1825	Anglesey History - Windmills; Anglesey Windmills	
Llanfair-Mathafarn-Eithaf	Melin Rhos Fawr; Mona Mill; SH 497 829	Tower		1757	Anglesey History - Windmills; Anglesey Windmills	
Llanfechell	Melin Cefn Coch; Caerdegog Uchaf; SH 342 914	Tower		Late 18th century	Anglesey History - Windmills; Anglesey Windmills	
Llangefni	Melin Wynt y Criaig; SH 465 757	Tower		Between 1828 and 1833	Anglesey History - Windmills; Anglesey Windmills	
Llangoed, Mariandyrys	Melin Llangoed; Felin Wynt; Tros y Marian; SH 608 812	Tower		1741	Anglesey History - Windmills; Anglesey Windmills	
Mechell	Melin Mechell; Melin Minffordd; Melin Maen Arthur; SH 362 902	Tower			Anglesey History - Windmills; Anglesey Windmills	
Mechell	Melin Pant y Gŵydd; SH 365 887	tower		Early 18th century	Anglesey History - Windmills; Anglesey Windmills	
Pentre Berw	Melin Berw; SH 474 723	tower		Late 18th century	Anglesey History - Windmills; Anglesey Windmills	
Porth Llechog	Melin y Pant; SH 416 943	Tower			Anglesey History - Windmills; Anglesey Windmills	
Rhoscefnhir	Melin Orsedd; SH 523 763	Tower			Anglesey History - Windmills; Anglesey Windmills	
Rhostrehwfa	Melin Pen Rhfw				Demolished August 1987; Anglesey History - Windmills; Anglesey Windmills	
Trearddur Bay	Stanley Mill; Melin y Gof; SH 2657 7887	Tower		1826	Anglesey History - Windmills; Anglesey Windmills	
Trearddur	SH 2513 8041	Tower				

== Notes ==
Mills in bold are still standing, known building dates are indicated in bold. Text in italics denotes indicates that the information is not confirmed, but is likely to be the case stated.
