= Mechell, Anglesey =

Community in Anglesey, Wales

Mechell
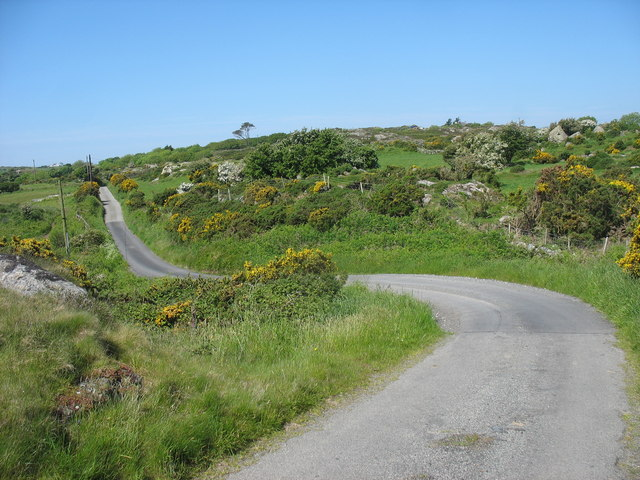
- The winding lane to Mynydd Mechell
- Population: 1,293 (2011 census)
- Community: Mechell
- Principal area: Anglesey
- Country: Wales
- Sovereign state: United Kingdom
- List of places UK Wales Anglesey Map of the community

Mechell is a community in the north of the Isle of Anglesey, Wales. Llanfechell is the largest village within the community area. Tregele, Llanfflewyn, Mynydd Mechell, Bodewryd, Rhosbeirio and Carreglefn have a more dispersed settlement pattern. The antiquity of these settlements is shown by the presence of 6 medieval (or older) churches and some 16 more ancient sites dating back into prehistory.

The population of the community in 2011 was 1,293.

== Situation ==
Mechell's settlements are all on inland situations, although a narrow strip of land reaches up as far as the north coast of the island, east of Cemaes Bay, in Llanbadrig Community. To the east is Cylch-y-Garn Community, and to the south is Tref Alaw and Rhosybol.

There are three wards within the Mechell community council area, with a total of 10 councillors representing Llanfechell, Mynydd Mechell and Carreglefn, plus a chairperson.

Prior to the 2012 Anglesey electoral boundary changes Mechell was an electoral ward for the county council. It is now part of a new Talybolion ward.

== History ==
Settlements within the local government Community of Mechell, Anglesey.

The oldest of the settlements appears to be Llanfechell, named, as is the larger community, after the 6th century saint Mechell, reputedly a Breton missionary. Tradition has it that he is buried in Llanfechell. The large number of prehistoric sites attest to human habitation across the Community since well before that.

There is a very detailed account of daily life in the Mechell area during the 18th century, within the diaries of William Bulkeley, (1691-1760). He lived at Brynddu, a house on the edge of Llanfechell, and kept a daily record of Anglesey life from 1734 to 1760.

== Economy ==
The land of Mechell Community is a settled agricultural landscape, with a network of small farms. The longstanding importance of arable agriculture is shown by the remains of four watermills and three windmills in the Mechell area: Meddanen Water Mill and Melin Mechell Windmill (also known as Minffordd Mill and Melin Maen Arthur) are close together so could have been worked by the same miller, utilising water and wind as available. Further south is Pant y Gŵydd, the second windmill. To the west, along the Afon Cafnan, was a series of mills, including the Cefn Coch Water Mill and Windmill, the Pandy Cefn Coch (a fulling mill), and Cafnan Water Mill at the mouth of the river.

Wylfa Nuclear Power Station, close to the Community boundary's northern tip, was the only substantial employer in the immediate neighbourhood, on the coast, 3 kilometres (1.9 miles) northwest of Llanfechell. It was the only Nuclear Power Station in Wales after Trawsfynedd shut down. The site produced electricity from 1971, and ceased at the end of 2015. Proposals from Horizon Nuclear Power to build 'Wylfa Newydd' are under consideration.

== Mechell Churches: Church in Wales ==
Mechell Community has 4 Church in Wales buildings in the Bangor Diocese and Bro Padrig Deanery,

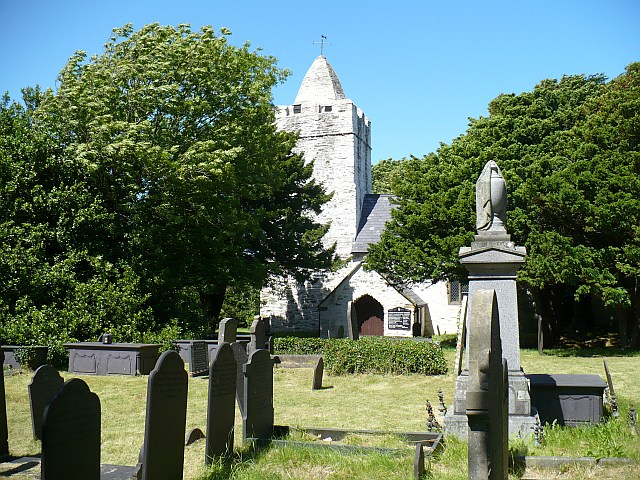
Llanfechell Parish Church

St Mechell's Church, Llanfechell
(Grade II* listed). 12th century church with 19th century rebuild. SH369913 53.3930°N 4.4536°W.

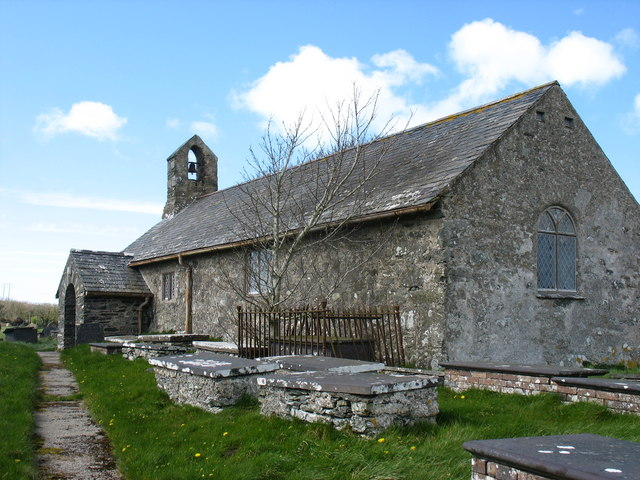
St Fflewin Church, Mynydd Mechell

St Fflewin's Church, Llanfflewin
(Grade II listed) in Mynydd Mechell. Documentary records from 1254, but the oldest extant fabric appears to be 18th century, extensively restored in the 1930s. SH350890 53.3724°N 4.4822°W.

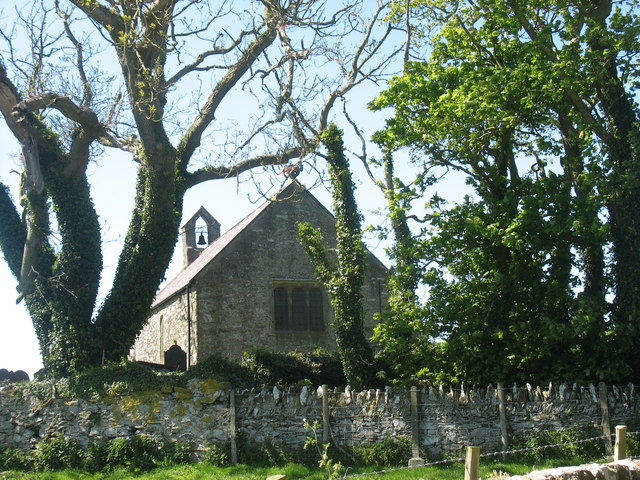
St Mary's Church, Bodewryd

St Mary's Church, Bodewryd
(Grade II listed). The present structure is from the 16th century or earlier, and on a much earlier site. The original dedication was to St Gewryd. SH400906, 53.3878°N 4.4071°W.

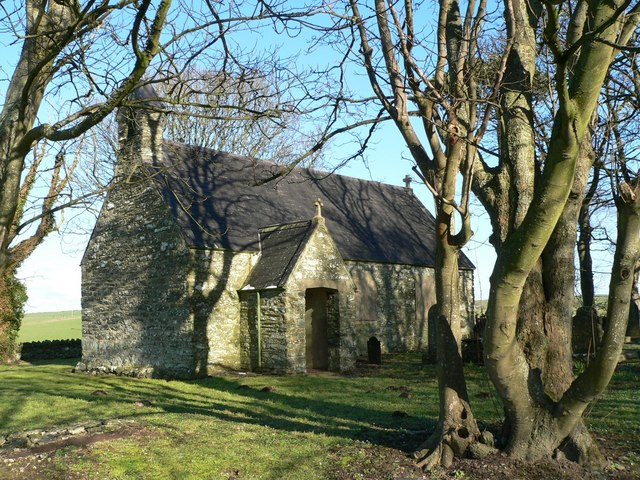
St. Peirio's Church

St Peirio's Church, Rhosbeirio
Grade II listed, now disused. SH391917. 53.3980°N 4.4213°W.

Capel Anhunedd-y-Pran
There is a redundant (or decayed) medieval chapel at Clegyrog. By 1796 it was in use as a cowhouse. SH388903, Coordinates:53.3849°N 4.4252°W.

Capel Newsaint
An unlocated medieval chapel stood somewhere in Mynydd Mechell. SH3590. 53.381°N 4.4821°W.

== Mechell non-conformist Chapels ==
There have been least nine non=conformist Chapels in the Mechell area, dating to the nineteenth and early 20th centuries:-

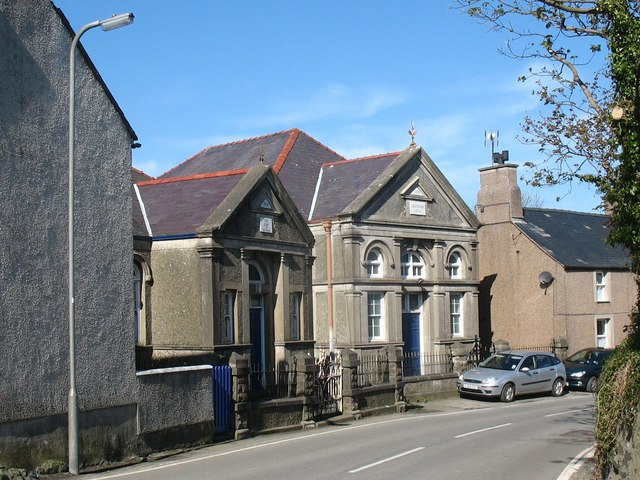
Libanus Chapel, Llanfechell

Libanus Chapel, Llanfechell
Methodistiaid Calfinaidd, Welsh Calvanistic Methodist Chapel on the village square. Founded in 1832, rebuilt in 1903. SH369912. 53.3927°N 4.4542°W

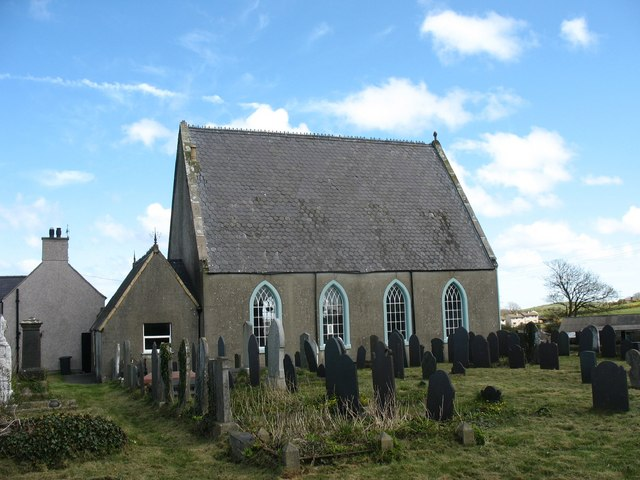
Ebenezer Chapel, Llanfechell

Ebenezer Chapel, Llanfechell
Welsh Independent chapel near the School, on Mountain Road. Built 1862, replacing a Chapel built soon after 1800. SH365909, 53.3896°N 4.4598°W

Calfaria Chapel, Mynydd Mechell
Welsh Baptist chapel built in 1897 to replace an earlier building of 1815. SH361900 53.38113°N 4.4663°W

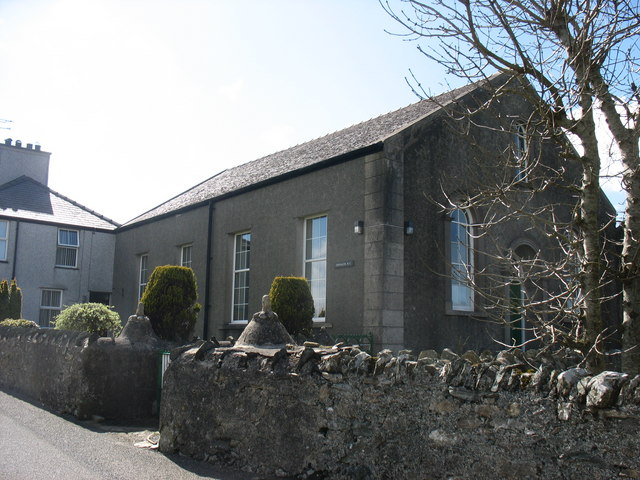
Jerusalem Chapel, Mynydd Mechell

Jerusalem Chapel, Mynydd Mechell
Methodistiaid Calfinaidd, Welsh Calvanistic Methodist chapek. SH358897, 53.3783°N 4.4709°W

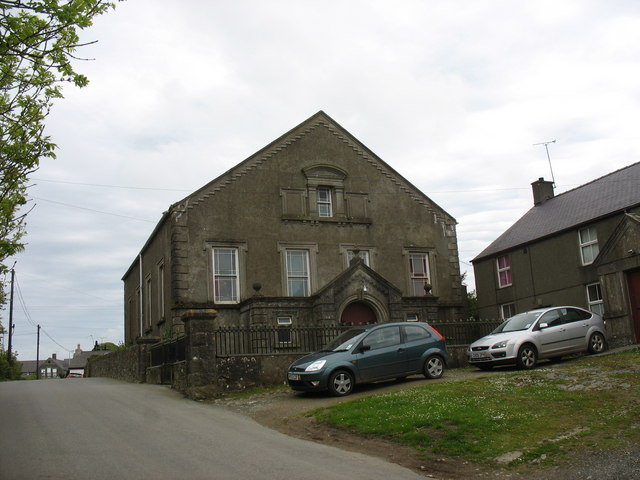
Bethlehem Chapel, Carreglefn

Bethlehem Chapel, Carreglefn
Welsh Calvinistic Methodist chapel. SH383891, 53.3744°N 4.4318°W

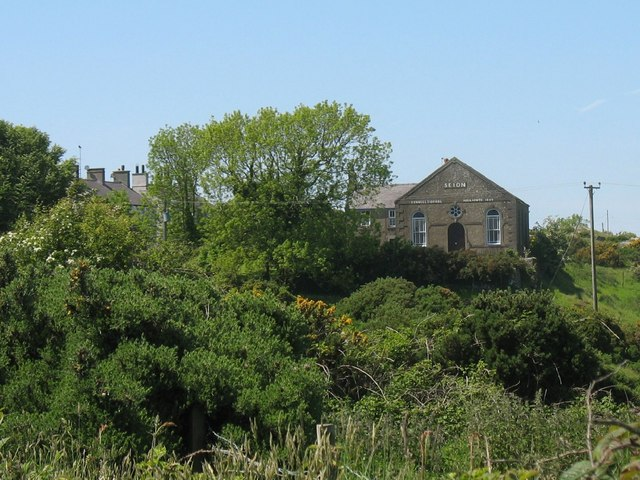
Seion Chapel, Carreglefn

Seion Chapel, Carreglefn
Independent Chapel. SH394895,53.3778°N 4.4164°W

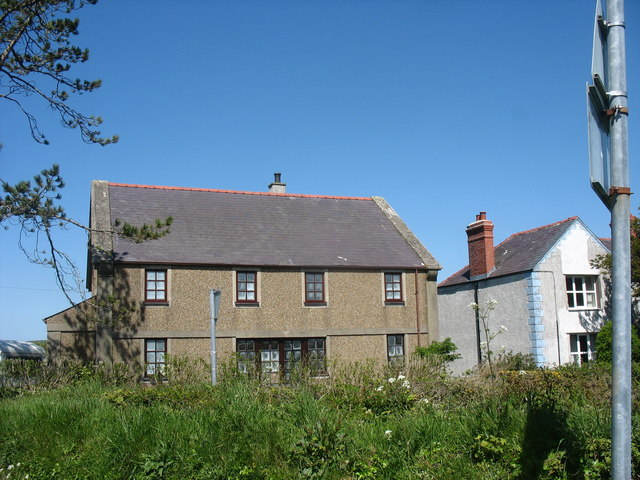
The former Capel Hephsiba, Rhosbeirio

Hephsibah Chapel, Rhosbeirio
Former Welsh Calvinistic Methodist Chapel, converted into a house in 1985. SH394913, 53.3943°N 4.4164°W

Capel Bethania, Tregele
The Calvinistic Methodist cause at Tregele began in 1810. The Chapel was rebuilt in 1906 and closed in 1973 and is now a house.

== Mechell notable buildings ==
All four extant medieval churches above are given the legal protection of Listed Building status. Below are the other listed buildings within the community, plus some other notable buildings and structures:-

=== Bodewryd ===
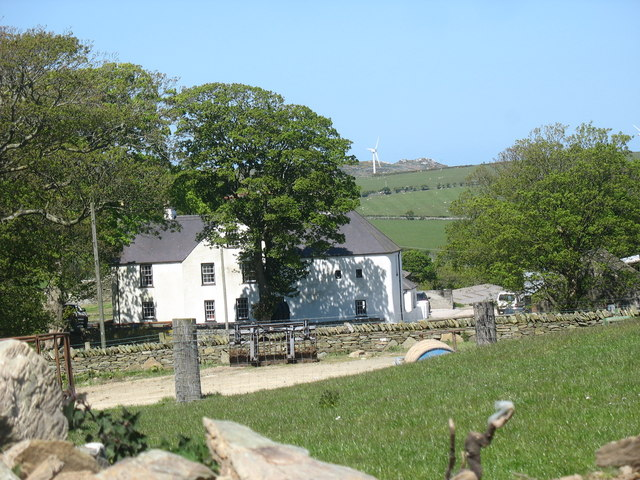
Plas Bodewryd

Plas Bodewryd
(Grade II* listed mansion). A 15th/16th century Hall house at Bodewryd, with substantial additions in every century following. SH40019082, 53.3899°N 4.4073°W.

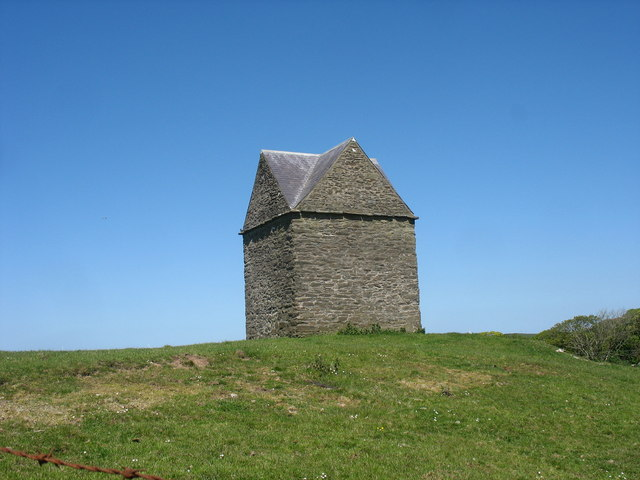
Colomendy Bodewryd Dovecot

Bodewryd Colomendy or Dovecote, Bodewryd
Grade II listed late 17th C. dovecote in the grounds of Plas Bodewryd. Stone walls incorporate around 400 nests. SH40019082, 53.3899°N 4.4073°W.

Lychgate at Church of St Mary, Bodewryd
Grade II listed building. SH40119057, 53.3877°N 4.4057°W.

=== Llanfechell ===
Brynddu, Llanfechell
Grade II listed 18th Century larger Anglesey house. Home of the Bulkeley Family. SH37329119 53.3924°N 4.4479°W.

Pont-y-Plas, Llanfechell
Road Bridge with square headed arches and steps to water. SH36889135||53.3937°N 4.4546°W.

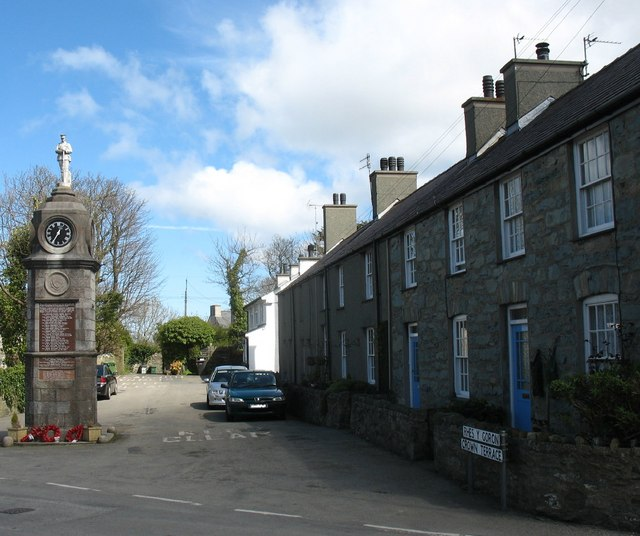
Crown Terrace facing the square at Llanfechell

Crown Terrace, including Crown House, Llanfechell
Grade II listed row of three terraced buildings with a shop/bank. SH369912, 53.3924°N 4.4542°W.

Old Rectory, Llanfechell
Grade II listed, 17th Century Rectory, with 18th C additions. SH36989128, 53.3931°N 4.4531°W

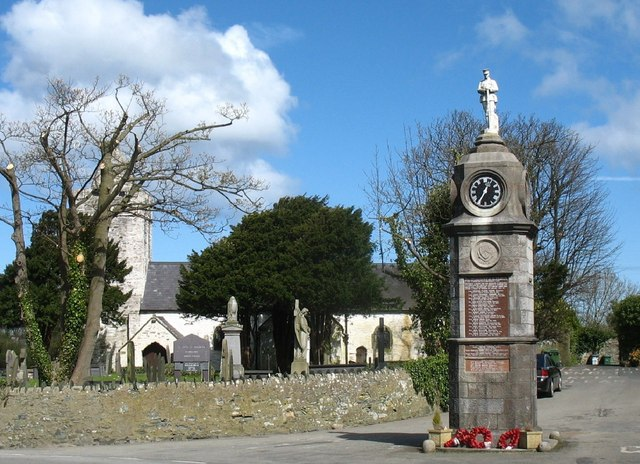
War Memorial at Llanfechell

War Memorial, Llanfechell
Grade II listed memorial to the fallen of the Great War, in the village square and incorporates a clock. SH37029120||53.3924°N 4.4525°W

=== Mynydd Mechell ===
Ffynnon Ddygfael, Mynydd Mechell
Well shaft close to a pool. SH35119050||53.3855°N 4.4808°W.

Llanddygfael-groes, Mynydd Mechell
Grade II listed building. SH35149059||53.3863°N 4.4804°W.

=== Tregele ===
Cae Mawr, Tregele
Grade II listed late 18th century farmhouse. SH34929088||53.3889°N 4.4838°W.

Cefn-Coch, Tregele
Grade II listed ||17th century central hall type house, with pointed internal doorways and 17th C. balusters. SH34259072 53.3872°N 4.4938°W.

Groesfechan, Tregele
Medieval domestic remains. SH351917||53.3963°N 4.4815°W

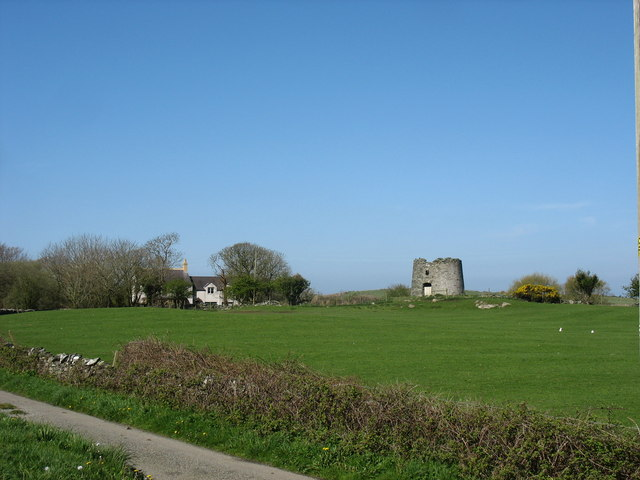
Ty'n y Felin old wind mill

Melin Cefn Coch (Ty'n y Felin), Tregele
Grade II listed building. SH34319139, 53.3933°N 4.4932°W.

=== Carreglefn ===
Cottage at Pant-y-Gist, Carreglefn
Grade II Listed Building, SH39358967, 53.3794°N 4.4167°W.

Hen Bont, Carreglefn
Grade II listed building. SH38408907||53.3737°N 4.4306°W.

Pant-y-cryntach, Carreglefn
Grade II listed building. SH38808967, 53.3792°N 4.4249°W

Ty Newydd, Carreglefn
Grade II listed building. SH38408907, 53.3737°N 4.4306°W.

Y Stryd, Carreglefn
Grade II listed building. SH38398906, 53.3736°N 4.4307°W

=== Llanfflewyn, near Mynydd Mechell ===
Twll-y-clawdd, Llanfflewyn
Grade II listed building. SH35638861, 53.3687°N 4.4719°W.

== Archaeological sites ==
There are five Scheduled monuments within the community area, all of them dating to prehistory, and a further 10 sites are also listed by the Royal Commission on the Ancient and Historical Monuments of Wales. All the sites are in open country within the community aea, so cannot be said to be in any one of the settlements. The 'settlement' column is there to give a guide as to which part of Mechell Community it is in.

Picture	Monument Name	settlement	Site type	Period	Purpose	Grid Reference & Coordinates
Bodewryd Standing Stone	Bodewryd Standing Stone	Bodewryd	Standing stone	Prehistoric	Religious, Ritual and Funerary	SH406902, 53.3847°N 4.3978°W
	Llifad enclosure	Carreglefn	Enclosure	Prehistoric	Possible defended settlement.	SH384910, 53.3915°N 4.4302°W
	Pen-y-Morwyd Round Barrow	Pen-y-Morwyd	Round barrow	Prehistoric	Religious, Ritual and Funerary	SH384912, 53.3933°N 4.4306°W
Standing stone east of Llanfechell	Standing Stone North of Llanfechell Church (Baron Hill Maen Hir)	Llanfechell	Standing stone	Prehistoric	Religious, Ritual and Funerary. Cup and ring mark found on one of the packing stones.	SH369916, 53.3964°N 4.4531°W
The Llanfechell Triangle	The Llanfechell Triangle Standing Stones	Llanfechell	Standing stone	Prehistoric	Religious, Ritual and Funerary	SH363916, 53.3966°N 4.46204°W

Other Archaeological sites in Mechell:-

Monument Name	settlement	Site details	Grid Reference & Coordinates
Barrow between Rhosbeirio and Yr Efail	Rhosbeirio	Bronze Age or later Round barrow	SH395911, 53.3922°N 4.4154°W
Burial Chamber at Foel Fawr, or Stones near Cromlech Farm	Llanfechell	It may just be a 'suggestive natural feature'.	SH360920, 53.3993°N 4.4675°W
Clegyrog Blas, Cropmark Enclosure	Carreglefn	Cropmarks of a concentric ditched enclosure.	SH386907, 53.3887°N 4.4284°W
Maen-Y-Goges; Maen-Y-Eoges (the Cook's stone)	Carreglefn	Maen y Goges - a glacial erratic Natural feature with legendary associations, from which Carreglefn is named.	SH395895, 53.3778°N 4.4141°W
Mynydd Groes Earthwork	Llanfechell	Field enclosure earthworks, largely cleared.	SH351915, 53.3940°N 4.4818°W
Pen-y-Morwydd Barrow	Llanfechell	Field enclosure earthworks, largely cleared.	SH385913, 53.3933°N 4.4306°W
Pen-y-Morwydd Pillow Mound	Llanfechell	Constructed rabbit warren. Up to 7 mounds recorded at this site, most no longer visible.	SH385912, 53.3927°N 4.4304°W
Enclosure north-west of Llanfechell	Llanfechell	roughly square enclosure 15m across.	SH364917, 53.3967°N 4.4622°W
Hilltop enclosure at Carog	Llanfechell	Neolithic settlement evidence with circular defensive ditch dated to 800BC. Also 800-900AD house and domestic artifacts. Excavated 2010.	SH373922, 53.4012°N 4.4491°W
Tai Hen Cropmark Enclosure	Llanfechell	Irregular rectilinear enclosure some 46m across	SH384915, 53.3957°N 4.4325°W

== See also ==
- List of Scheduled Monuments in Anglesey
