= Twrcelyn Rural District =

Former local government area in the UK

Coordinates: 53.330°N 4.377°W

Twrcelyn
- Area
  - 1901: 53,869 acres (218.00 km^{2})
  - 1961: 53,865 acres (217.98 km^{2})
- Population
  - 1901: 9,512
  - 1971: 9,752
- History
  - Created: 1894
  - Abolished: 1974
  - Succeeded by: Ynys Môn - Isle of Anglesey
- Status: Rural District
  - HQ: Llanerchymedd

Twrcelyn was a rural district in the administrative county of Anglesey, Wales, from 1894 to 1974. The district took its name from Twrcelyn, one of the ancient cwmwds or medieval subdivisions of the island.

The district was formed by the Local Government Act 1894 as successor to the Anglesey Rural Sanitary District. The district consisted of the following civil parishes:

- Bodewryd
- Coedana
- Carreglefn
- Llanallgo
- Llanbabo
- Llanbadrig
- Llanbedrgoch
- Llanddyfnan
- Llandyfrydog
- Llaneilian
- Llanerchymedd
- Llaneugrad
- Llanfflewyn
- Llanfihangel Tre'r-beirdd
- Llanfair Mathafarn Eithaf
- Llanfechell
- Llangwyllog
- Llanwenllwyfo
- Llechcynfarwydd
- Penrhoslligwy
- Rhodogeidio
- Rhosybol
- Tregaian

The district initially also included Amlwch, until it became a separate urban district in 1901. The rural district was abolished in 1974, when the Local Government Act 1972 amalgamated Twrcelyn with the other local authorities on the island to become the district of Ynys Môn - Isle of Anglesey.
