= Morris Williams (writer) =

Welsh writer ("Nicander"; 1809–1874)

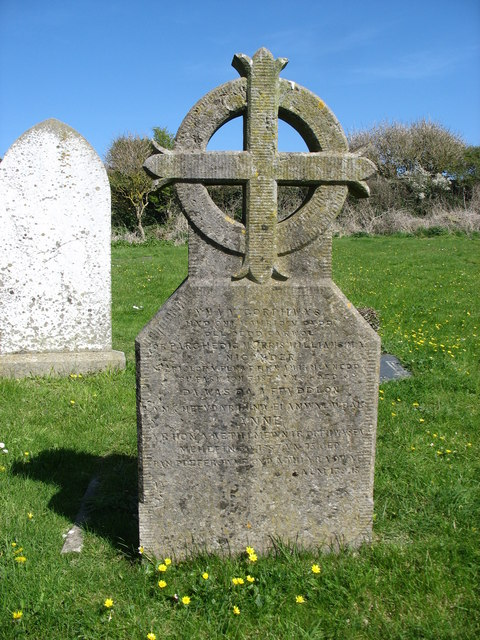
Morris Williams's gravestone at St Rhuddlad's Church, Anglesey

Morris Williams (20 August 1809 – 3 January 1874) was a Welsh clergyman and writer, commonly known by his bardic name Nicander. He worked on the Welsh Prayer Book of 1841 and himself produced a metrical Welsh Psalms of David.

== Early life ==
Williams was born at Caernarfon, the son of William Morris. His mother, Sarah, was the sister of Peter Jones (Pedr Fardd). The family moved to Coed Cae Bach, Llangybi and he went to school at Llanystumdwy. He was then apprenticed to a carpenter.

Once his talent for poetry had been recognised, he was able to attend the King's School, Chester, followed by Jesus College, Oxford. He was ordained as an Anglican clergyman in 1836, and appointed Curate of Holywell, later of Bangor and Pentir, and eventually of Amlwch in Anglesey.

In 1840, Williams married Ann Jones of Denbigh. They had eight children.

== Bardic chair and rectory ==
At the Aberffraw Eisteddfod of 1849, Williams won the bardic chair for an awdl on the Creation. In 1859 he became the Rector of Llanrhuddlad, with Llanfflewyn and the isolated St Rhwydrus's Church, Llanrhwydrus, in Anglesey. He won the bardic chair again in 1861 at Aberdare.

== Theological literature ==
Williams in his theological beliefs was a follower of the Oxford Movement. Whilst serving at Holywell, he was one of four commissioners who prepared the revised edition of the Welsh Prayer Book of 1841. Later, while pastor at Amlwch on Anglesey, he translated the Book of Psalms into Welsh metre, entitling it Y Psallwyr, neu Psalmau Dafydd (The Psalter, or the Psalms of David).

He wanted to make psalm singing more popular by using a wider variety of metres than Prys had done. He completed his psalter in 1850 and dedicated it to the Marquis of Lansdowne. In 1851 he began editing the new folio edition of the Welsh Bible for SPCK.

== Works ==
- Y Flwyddyn Eglwysig (1843)

=== Translations ===
- Disce Vivere (1847)
- Disce Mori (1848)
- Y Psallwyr Metrical version of the Psalter (Llundain: H. Hughes; 1850)

=== Edited ===
- Llyfr yr Homiliau (1847)
- Works of Dafydd Ionawr (1851)
