= St Mechell's Church, Llanfechell =

Coordinates: 53.3930°N 4.4536°W

St Mechell's Church
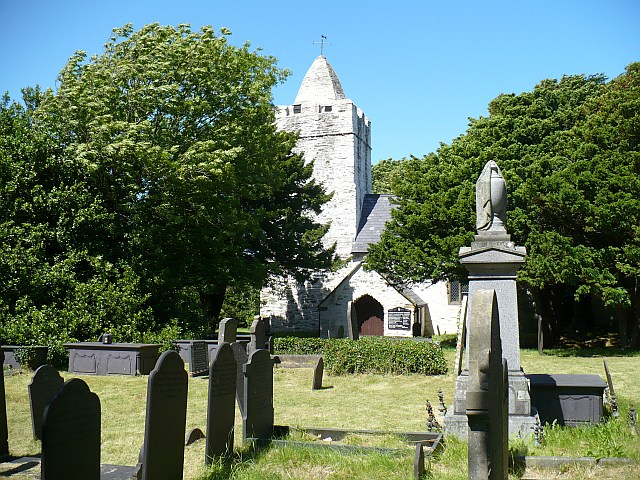
- St Mechell's Church
- Country: Wales
- Denomination: Church in Wales

Architecture
- Heritage designation: Grade II*
- Designated: 5 December 1970
- Architectural type: Church
- Style: Medieval

St Mechell's Church is a medieval church in the village of Llanfechell, Anglesey, Wales. The building dates from the 12th century and was rebuilt in the mid to late 19th century. It also underwent some renovations in the 1990s. It was designated a Grade II*-listed building on 5 December 1970.

== History and architecture ==
St Mechell's Church is dedicated to Saint Mechell. The church is in a rural and scarcely populated part of the Isle of Anglesey, located at the north side of the crossroads in the centre of Llanfechell. The church was first mentioned in the Norwich Taxation of 1254. The oldest parts of the structure are the nave and western parts of the chancel, which both date from the 12th century. The chancel was possibly lengthened in the 13th century, however its current length suggests that the chancel is an "unusually long" structure from the 12th century. The south transept was added in the 14th century, whereas the north transept is of an uncertain date and has since been modernised.

The church tower is contemporary; the western tower dates from the 16th century with an added 18th-century spire. Although modernised, the porch is most likely medieval. It has been suggested that the original 12th century church had a central tower. Factors supporting this assertion include irregularities and joints in the walls near the central crossing. The church underwent significant renovation work in 1840, 1870 and in the late 1990s. It was designated a Grade II*-listed building on 5 December 1970.
