= St Ceidio's Church, Rhodogeidio =

Coordinates: 53.342260°N 4.387570°W

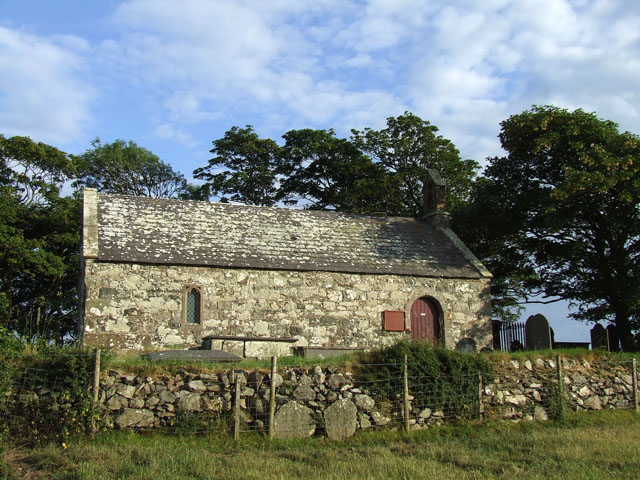
- The north side of the church

- Location in Anglesey
- Location: Rhodogeidio, near Llannerch-y-medd, Anglesey
- Country: Wales

History
- Status: Church
- Founded: 7th century (first church); Present structure 1845, on the site of a 14th-century church
- Dedication: St Ceidio

Architecture
- Functional status: Disused
- Heritage designation: Grade II
- Designated: 12 May 1970

Specifications
- Materials: Rubble masonry, slate roof

St Ceidio's Church, Rhodogeidio is a rural 19th-century church near Llannerch-y-medd, in Anglesey, north Wales. It was built using materials from the 14th-century church that previously stood on the site, which has been used for Christian worship since some time in the 7th century. The present building, which contains an east window dating from the 14th century and a 15th-century font, is no longer used for services, but has been looked after by local people.

It is a Grade II listed building, a national designation given to "buildings of special interest, which warrant every effort being made to preserve them", in particular because it is "unusual in being built closely to the form and detail of its Medieval predecessor." Two 19th-century writers thought that the church was in a "dreary spot", but a 2006 guide to Anglesey churches describes it as being in a pleasant location with good views.

== History and location ==
The church is dedicated to St Ceidio, a 6th-century British saint who established a number of churches in Wales. Geraint Jones, writing a guide to Anglesey churches in 2006, said that the site of the church dates from the 7th century, and the 19th-century antiquarian Angharad Llwyd wrote in her history of Anglesey that a church was thought to have been at this location since 630. A 14th-century church here was rebuilt in 1845 under the supervision of the then rector, Hugh Wynne Jones. The 19th-century church reuses the foundations and materials of its predecessor.

At one time, the church on this site was used as a chapel of ease to Llantrisant church. In the 15th century, St Mary's Church, Rhodogeidio, was built to serve as a chapel of ease for St Ceidio's. In 2006, one author noted that St Ceidio's had not been regularly used for some years, but restoration work had been carried out by local people. St Mary's, which is about 0.75 miles (1.25 km) to the west, is no longer used for services either, but is in ruins.

St Ceidio's is by the side of a road in the countryside about 1 mile (1.6 km) to the northwest of Llannerch-y-medd, and is set within a raised circular churchyard, known in Welsh as a llan. The area takes its name from the church: "Rhod-" is thought to be an abbreviation of Rhodwydd ("defended mound") and "-geidio" is a modified form of the saint's name; i.e., "the defended mound of Ceidio".

== Architecture and fittings ==
St Ceidio's is constructed of rubble masonry, dressed with freestone. The roof is made of slate, and there is a stone 19th-century bellcote at the west end. The roof trusses can be seen from the inside. Entrance is through a round-headed doorway in the north wall at the west end. Cadw (the Welsh Assembly Government body responsible for the built heritage of Wales) says that this doorway is from the 14th century, but a 2009 guide to the buildings of north-west Wales says that it may date from the 17th century. Inside, there is no internal structural division between the nave and the chancel apart from a single step. There are four windows, all with clear leaded glass: the east window is the oldest, dating from the 14th century. It has a single light (section of window) with some tracery at the top and an external hoodmould. The two windows in the south wall and the window in the north wall date from the 19th century, and are set in rectangular frames; the windows are topped with trefoils.

The pews and the elevated pulpit date from the 19th century. The church has some marble memorials on the walls, dating from the 18th century, and a 15th-century octagonal font. A 1937 survey by the Royal Commission on Ancient and Historical Monuments in Wales and Monmouthshire noted a bier from 1746, an oak communion table from about 1700, and an inscribed Elizabethan silver cup. Paraffin lamps are used to light the church, since there is no electricity connection.

== Assessment ==
The east end of the church

The church has national recognition and statutory protection from alteration as it has been designated as a Grade II listed building – the lowest of the three grades of listing, designating "buildings of special interest, which warrant every effort being made to preserve them". It was given this status on 12 May 1970, and has been listed because it is a "simple mid-19th century church, unusual in being built closely to the form and detail of its Medieval predecessor." Cadw, which is responsible for the inclusion of Welsh buildings on the statutory lists, says that this means that St Ceidio's retains "strong vernacular character."

Angharad Llwyd, writing before St Ceidio's was rebuilt, referred to it as a "small edifice" in a "dreary spot". The 19th-century writer Samuel Lewis, describing the rebuilt church, was more complimentary: "The expense of the re-edification was very moderate; the ancient foundations were preserved, the same stones were used, and though the present building is a much better one than the former, its style is strictly the same." However, he too thought that the church was in a "dreary spot". The Welsh politician and church historian Sir Stephen Glynne visited the church in 1851. He said that the rebuilding of the church had been done "on the whole in a neat style", with the inside "very fairly arranged".

A 2009 guide to the buildings of the region says that it is a "tiny church in a raised llan in a hilltop circle of trees", and calls this "the epitome of ancient siting". The authors note that the east window is comparable to that in another Anglesey church, St Caean's Church, Tregaean (a comparison also made in the Royal Commission's 1937 report). A 2006 guide to the churches of Anglesey describes St Ceidio's as standing "in a pleasant, quiet rural location", with "good views in all directions".
