= Bryn Hafod =

Coordinates: 53.33689°N 4.372408°W

- Location within Anglesey
- OS grid reference: SH 4213 8484
  - Cardiff: 137.8 mi (221.8 km)
  - London: 219 mi (352 km)
- Community: Llannerch-y-medd
- Principal area: Anglesey
- Country: Wales
- Sovereign state: United Kingdom
- Post town: Llannerch-y-medd
- Police: North Wales
- Fire: North Wales
- Ambulance: Welsh
- UK Parliament: Ynys Môn
- Senedd Cymru – Welsh Parliament: Ynys Môn

Bryn Hafod is an area in the community of Llannerch-y-medd, Anglesey, Wales, which is 137.8 miles (221.8 km) from Cardiff and 219 miles (352.4 km) from London. Bryn Hafod is represented in the Senedd by Rhun ap Iorwerth (Plaid Cymru) and is part of the Ynys Môn constituency in the House of Commons.

== See also ==
- List of localities in Wales by population
