= Penmorwdd =

Coordinates: 53.393696°N 4.429829°W

- Location within Anglesey
- OS grid reference: SH 3853 9129
  - Cardiff: 142.4 mi (229.2 km)
  - London: 223.1 mi (359.0 km)
- Community: Mechell
- Principal area: Anglesey
- Country: Wales
- Sovereign state: United Kingdom
- Post town: Rhosgoch
- Police: North Wales
- Fire: North Wales
- Ambulance: Welsh
- UK Parliament: Ynys Môn
- Senedd Cymru – Welsh Parliament: Ynys Môn

Penmorwdd is a hamlet in the community of Mechell, Anglesey, Wales, which is 142.4 miles (229.1 km) from Cardiff and 223.1 miles (359.1 km) from London.

The place is known for the Pen-y-Morwyd Round Barrel burial monument.

== See also ==
- List of localities in Wales by population
