= Menai Bach, Rhydwyn =

Coordinates: 53.3700°N 4.5322°W

Menai Bach is a Grade II listed building in Rhydwyn, rural north west Anglesey, Wales. It is a C19 terraced house. A date stone offset to the left of the doorway to an adjacent house reads AD 1869.
