= Carmel, Wales =

Carmel, Wales could refer to:

- Carmel, Anglesey
- Carmel, Carmarthenshire
- Carmel, Flintshire
- Carmel, Gwynedd
- Carmel, Powys
