= St Mary's Church, Llanfair-yng-Nghornwy =

Coordinates: 53.388096°N 4.517068°W

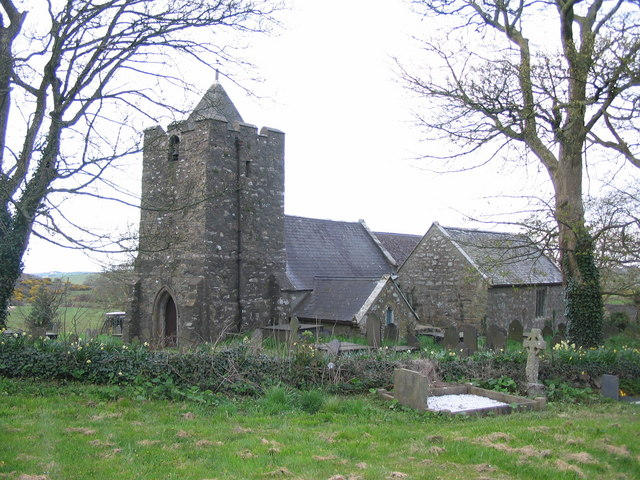
- The church from the south-west

- Location in Anglesey
- Location: Llanfair-yng-Nghornwy, Anglesey
- Country: Wales
- Denomination: Church in Wales

History
- Status: Parish church
- Founded: 11th or 12th century
- Dedication: St Mary

Architecture
- Functional status: Active
- Heritage designation: Grade I
- Designated: 12 May 1970
- Architect(s): Weightman and Hadfield, Sheffield (1847 restoration); Harold Hughes (1931 repairs)
- Architectural type: Church
- Style: Medieval with Perpendicular details

Specifications
- Length: Nave: 27 ft 9 in (8.5 m)
- Materials: Rubble masonry dressed with freestone; slate roof

Administration
- Province: Province of Wales
- Diocese: Diocese of Bangor
- Archdeaconry: Bangor
- Deanery: Llifon and Talybolion
- Parish: Bodedern with Llanfaethlu

Clergy
- Vicar: Vacant

St Mary's Church, Llanfair-yng-Nghornwy is a medieval parish church in the north-west of Anglesey, north Wales. The date of foundation of the church, which is in the village of Llanfair-yng-Nghornwy, is unknown, but the oldest parts date from the 11th or 12th century. It has twice been enlarged: in the 15th century, when the chancel was rebuilt, and in the 16th century, when a chapel was added to the south of the chancel, separated by three arches. The tower at the west end is from the 17th century. A south porch of unknown date has been converted into a vestry, and the church is now entered through the tower.

St Mary's is a Grade I listed building, a national designation given to buildings of "exceptional, usually national, interest", in particular because it is regarded as "a fine rural parish church, incorporating significant early Medieval fabric". Writers in the 19th century commented on the "lofty square tower", the "very good" east window, and the "many elegant monuments"; the clergyman and antiquarian Harry Longueville Jones called St Mary's "one of the best specimens of an old parish church in the island". In the 21st century, one writer has noted the "impressive lychgate" and a guide to the buildings of the region calls it "the most important church in north west Anglesey".

The church is still used for worship by the Church in Wales, one of nine in a combined parish, although as of 2013 there has not been an incumbent priest since September 2009. People associated with the church include James Williams, a 19th-century rector who was awarded a gold medal for his efforts to save lives at sea, and his great-grandson, the artist Sir Kyffin Williams. Both are buried in the churchyard.

== History and location ==
St Mary's Church is the parish church for the village of Llanfair-yng-Nghornwy in the north-west of Anglesey, north Wales. It is set in a churchyard at the side of a minor road, in the south-east of the village. The area is near the coast, about 8 miles (13 km) from the port town of Holyhead. Llanfair-yng-Nghornwy takes its name in part from the church: the Welsh word llan originally meant "enclosure" and then "church", and "-fair" is a modified form of the saint's name (Mair being Welsh for "Mary"). The parish's coastal position is reflected in its full name, which means "St Mary's in the promontory", or "St Mary in the angle of the waters".

It is uncertain when the first church was constructed on the site. There was a church in Llanfair-yng-Nghornwy before 1254, mentioned in the Norwich Taxation of that year. The oldest parts of the present structure are the nave walls and the arch between the nave and the chancel (to the east of the nave); these date from the 11th or 12th century. In the 15th century, the chancel was reconstructed and enlarged; in the following century, a chapel was added to the south of the chancel, separated by an arcade of three arches. In her 1833 history of Anglesey, Angharad Llwyd said that the south chapel "belongs exclusively" to one of the local landed estates, and the chancel belonged to another.

A tower was added at the west end in the 17th century, perhaps in 1660 according to a 2009 guide to the buildings of the region. At some stage, a porch was added to the south-west corner of the nave, but it has "no datable features". In the middle of the 19th century the porch entrance was blocked off and replaced by a window, and since then access to the church has been through a door on the west side of the tower. Some restoration work was carried out in 1847 by the Sheffield-based architects Weightman and Hadfield. Their plans included a proposal to add a chapel to the north side, but this did not happen. Further work was undertaken in 1860, and some repairs were carried out in the chancel and south chapel in the 1930s under the architect and historian Harold Hughes.

St Mary's is still used for worship by the Church in Wales. It is one of nine churches in the combined benefice of Bodedern with Llanfaethlu. It is within the deanery of Llifion and Talybolion, the archdeaconry of Bangor and the Diocese of Bangor. As of 2013, there is no incumbent priest at the church, and there has not been one since September 2009.

James Williams, rector of St Mary's from 1821 to 1872, helped to establish the Anglesey Association for the Preservation of Lives from Shipwreck in 1828, in the wake of a storm that caused a boat to sink with 140 deaths. He was awarded a gold medal by the Royal National Institute for the Preservation of Life from Shipwreck (later renamed the Royal National Lifeboat Institution) in 1835, for his efforts in the rescue of a boat during a gale. Angharad Llwyd, writing when Williams was at St Mary's, noted that "this benevolent gentleman, aided by his lady, ever alert in the cause of humanity, are generally among the first on the shore, in case of accident, well supplied with restoratives, and other necessaries, to comfort and protect the suffering mariners." The artist Sir Kyffin Williams (1918–2006) was a great-grandson of James and his wife Frances. At his request, a memorial to them was put up on the south wall of the chapel. James, Frances and Kyffin are buried in the churchyard. The churchyard also contains the Commonwealth war graves of a Royal Navy sailor of World War I and another from World War II.

== Architecture and fittings ==
=== Structure ===
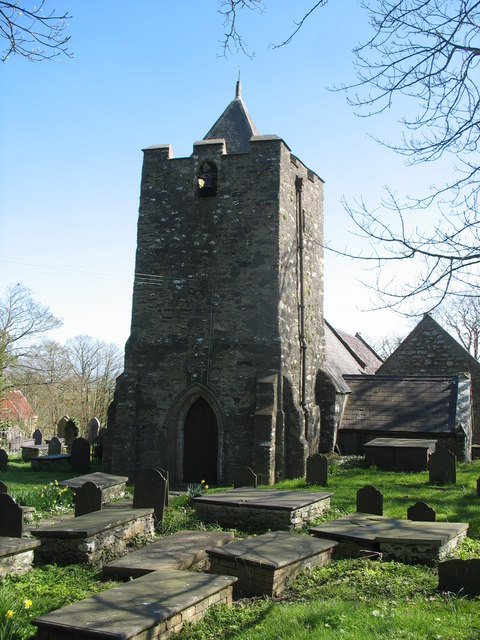
The 17th-century tower

St Mary's is a medieval church, built using rubble masonry dressed with freestone and displaying Perpendicular details. The roof is made of slate with stone copings. Internally, the timbers of the roofs of the nave, chancel and chapel are exposed. The beams running the length of the nave are decorated at intervals by painted plaster shield designs. The chancel roof is from the late 15th century, and the chapel roof is from the early part of the following century.

=== Interior ===
The church is entered through the door at the west side of the tower, with modern double doors between the tower and the nave set into a plain square doorway dating from the 17th or 18th century. The nave is 27 feet 9 inches by 13 feet 8 inches (8.5 by 4.2 m). Between the nave and the chancel there is a plain round arch, from the 11th or 12th century, a step up, and a rail. At the east end of the chancel, there is a further step up from the chapel into the sanctuary, which has some 18th-century gravestones set into it. The late 15th-century chancel, which measures 32 feet 6 inches by 14 feet (9.9 by 4.3 m), has some memorials from the 18th and early 19th centuries. One is to a bonesetter called Evan Thomas (died 1814), erected by Thomas Bulkeley, 7th Viscount Bulkeley; another, to Emma Viscountess Bulkeley Williams, is made from ornately decorated marble.

The three arches between the chancel and chapel rest on octagonal columns. One of the arches has inscribed upon it, in early 16th-century lettering, SCA MARIA ORA PRO ME DAVID A JACO ("Saint Mary pray for me David ap Iago"); another has a stone with a roughly carved face. There was once a rood screen across the chancel, as shown by markings on the north wall and on the westernmost of the arches. It was still in position in 1867, when one visitor mentioned it in his notes on the church. Panelling has been fixed to the east and south walls of the sanctuary in the chapel as a reredos. The chapel measures 32 feet 6 inches by 14 feet 6 inches (9.9 by 4.4 m).

The font is at the rear of the nave on the north side. It is octagonal on the outside, with a circular bowl inside. A survey of church plate within the Bangor diocese in 1906 recorded: a large silver chalice, inscribed with the donor's name and the year 1713; a plain silver paten, dated 1724–25; and a pewter flagon, from about 1710.

=== Windows ===
The nave has two windows. The south window, to the east of the vestry, is from the 14th century. It has two lights (sections of window separated by mullions) with flat tops and is decorated with stone tracery. A survey of the church in 1937 by the Royal Commission on Ancient and Historical Monuments in Wales and Monmouthshire noted the window's "crude workmanship and design." The window on the north nave wall has three lights with rounded tops. It too has been dated to the 14th century, but other sources say that it is from the 16th century. A 2009 guide to buildings of north-west Wales says that the window is "typically 16th-century".

The 15th-century window at the east end of the chancel has three lights topped with cinquefoils (a pattern of five joined circles). The lights are decorated with tracery, and set in a pointed arch frame with a hood mould. Stained glass from 1850 depicts (from north to south) Christ with children, Christ at a table, and the cross. The north window in the chancel is a 19th-century copy of the north nave window. There are two windows in the chapel, each with three lights; one in the east wall from the 16th century set in an arch with a hood mould, the other in the south wall set in a flat-headed frame.

=== Tower and porch ===
The tower has external buttresses and the door on the west side is set in a pointed arch frame with a hood mould. The buttresses and door were added to the tower after it was built; the 1937 Royal Commission survey described them as "modern". There are two stages (levels) to the tower; the tall upper stage is slightly narrower than the base, which measures 8 feet 6 inches by 8 feet 9 inches (26 by 2.7 m). The tower has simple rectangular openings in the north, east and south walls. There is a 17th-century bell in the west wall of the tower in a plain arch opening; the top of the wall is crenellated. Behind the parapet at the top of the tower, there is a short spire in the shape of a pyramid, made from wood and covered in slates.

The south porch has been described as "unusually long"; it measures 11 feet 6 inches by 8 feet 9 inches (3.5 by 2.7 m) and has been used as a vestry since the external doorway was blocked off and converted into a window. The 14th-century doorway from the nave into the vestry has a pointed head in a square frame, and was described in the 1937 survey as having an "unusual design". The porch roof may be from the late medieval period.

== Assessment ==
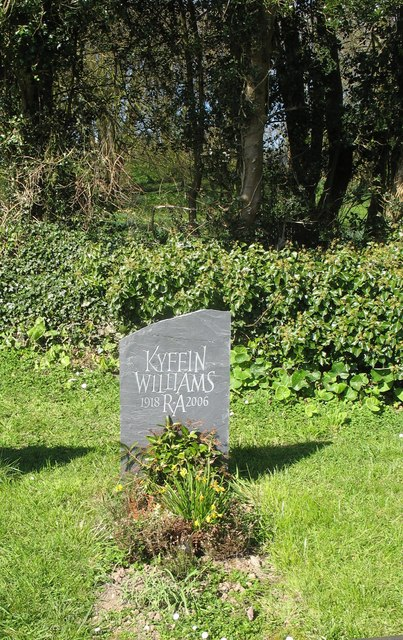
The grave of the artist Sir Kyffin Williams

St Mary's has national recognition and statutory protection from alteration as it has been designated as a Grade I listed building – the highest grade of listing, designating " exceptional, usually national, interest"; fewer than 2 per cent of the listed buildings in Wales are in this category. It was given this status on 12 May 1970, as "a fine rural parish church, incorporating significant early Medieval fabric, including a 12th-century chancel arch". Cadw (the Welsh Government body responsible for the built heritage of Wales and the inclusion of Welsh buildings on the statutory lists) also notes the "good late Medieval additions, including a fine 16th-century arcaded chapel", and says that St Mary's is of "special interest" because of its early date, "and for the quality of its later detail".

Writing in 1833, before the restoration of 1847, Angharad Llwyd described the church as "a spacious ancient structure, partly in the Norman style, with a lofty square tower, of rude architecture". She noted the "massive circular pillars and arches" in the chancel, and the "peculiar good taste" of the architecture of the recently rebuilt rectory. The 19th-century writer Samuel Lewis remarked upon the "many elegant monuments" in the church.

Writing in 1862, the clergyman and antiquarian Harry Longueville Jones said that it was "one of the largest churches in this division of Anglesey" He said that it had recently been "judiciously repaired and restored" by James Williams and was "now one of the best specimens of an old parish church in the island", adding that the east window was "good in detail and in execution".

The Welsh politician and church historian Sir Stephen Glynne visited the church in 1867. He said that the east window was "a very good Perpendicular one of three lights, early in the style." He described the churchyard as "secluded, and shaded by fine trees" and the tower as "rude and plain", noting that the "open bell arch" on the west side was comparable to the one at St Mary's Church, Llanerchymedd.

A 2006 guide to the churches of Anglesey describes the "fairly large church" as standing in a "quiet wooded location". It also comments upon the "impressive lychgate" at the entrance to the churchyard and the "squat pyramidal structure" on top of the tower. A 2009 guide to the buildings of the former county of Gwynedd calls St Mary's "the most important church of north-west Anglesey" and says that it has "an unusual plan".
