= Gwredog =

Coordinates: 53.3486°N 4.3991°W

- Location within Anglesey
- OS grid reference: SH404862
  - Cardiff: 139 mi (224 km)
  - London: 220 mi (350 km)
- Community: Llannerch-y-medd
- Principal area: Anglesey
- Country: Wales
- Sovereign state: United Kingdom
- Post town: Llannerch-y-medd
- Police: North Wales
- Fire: North Wales
- Ambulance: Welsh
- UK Parliament: Ynys Môn
- Senedd Cymru – Welsh Parliament: Bangor Conwy Môn

Gwredog is a village in the community of Llannerch-y-medd, Anglesey, Wales.

In 1883 it was noted as a chapelry of only two farms, part of the parish of Llantrisant. The chapel was dedicated to St Mary.

== See also ==
- List of localities in Wales by population
- St Mary's Church, Rhodogeidio, located in the village
