= Bachau =

Hamlet in Anglesey, Wales

Coordinates: 53.32°N 04.35°W

- Location within Anglesey
- OS grid reference: SH4383
- Principal area: Anglesey
- Country: Wales
- Sovereign state: United Kingdom
- Police: North Wales
- Fire: North Wales
- Ambulance: Welsh

Bachau (Welsh pronunciation) is a small rural hamlet of about a dozen dwellings in Anglesey, North West Wales. Bachau is represented in the Senedd by Rhun ap Iorwerth (Plaid Cymru). In the House of Commons it is part of the Ynys Môn constituency. It lies in the community of Llanerchymedd.
