= Dwyran Rural District =

Former local government area in the UK

Coordinates: 53.168°N 4.332°W

Dwyran
- Area
  - 1901: 15,544 acres (62.90 km^{2})
  - 1931: 15,463 acres (62.58 km^{2})
- Population
  - 1901: 3,055
  - 1931: 2,747
- History
  - Created: 1894
  - Abolished: 1933
  - Succeeded by: Aethwy Rural District
- Status: Rural District

Dwyran was a rural district in the administrative county of Anglesey, Wales from 1894 to 1933.

The rural district was formed by the Local Government Act 1894 from the part of Carnarvon Rural Sanitary District in Anglesey. It took its name from the village of Dwyran, which lay at its centre.

The district consisted of five civil parishes:

- Llanfair Cwmmwd
- Llangaffo
- Llangeinwen
- Llanidan
- Newborough

The rural district was abolished in 1933, when a county review order amalgamated it into an enlarged Aethwy Rural District.
