= St Mary's Church, Rhodogeidio =

Coordinates: 53.342582°N 4.406474°W

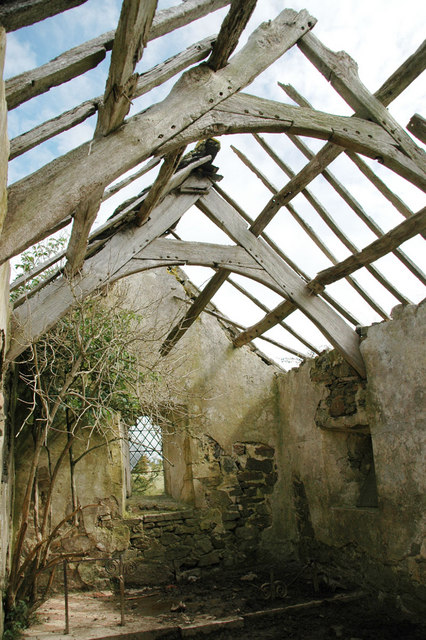
- Inside the ruined church, looking towards the east window

- Location in Anglesey
- Location: Rhodogeidio, near Llannerch-y-medd, Anglesey
- Country: Wales

History
- Status: Chapel of ease
- Founded: 15th century
- Dedication: St Mary

Architecture
- Functional status: Disused and in ruins
- Heritage designation: Grade II
- Designated: 12 May 1970
- Architectural type: Church
- Style: Late medieval

Specifications
- Length: 30 ft (9.1 m)
- Width: 12 ft 3 in (3.7 m)
- Materials: Rubble masonry

St Mary's Church, Rhodogeidio is a small medieval church, dating from the 15th century, near Llannerch-y-medd, in Anglesey, north Wales. It served as a chapel of ease to another church in the area, St Ceidio's. Some restoration work was carried out in the 19th century, but St Mary's has since fallen into disuse and is now largely in ruins.

It is a Grade II listed building, a national designation given to "buildings of special interest, which warrant every effort being made to preserve them", in particular because it is "a late Medieval church of exceptionally simple character", and is virtually unaltered despite its poor condition. One writer has said that St Mary's "has the distinction of probably being the most isolated church in Anglesey".

== History and location ==
St Mary's Church is in the countryside in Rhodogeidio, in Anglesey, north Wales. It is about 1.5 miles (2.4 km) north of Llannerch-y-medd, towards the north of Anglesey. It is reached by a footpath from a farm – it is only accessible on foot – and is surrounded by a churchyard. The surrounding area is known as Gwredog.

It was built in the 15th century as a chapel of ease to serve St Ceidio's Church, Rhodogeidio, about 0.75 miles (1.25 km) to the east. Restoration work was carried out in the 19th century, but the church later fell into disuse. It has been in ruins since sometime between 1937, when the survey by the Royal Commission on Ancient and Historical Monuments in Wales and Monmouthshire recorded its condition as "fair", and 1970, when it was given listed building status and its "very poor" condition noted.

== Architecture and fittings ==
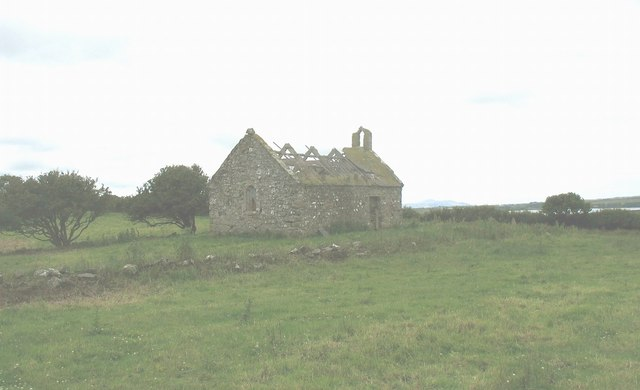
A 2008 view of the ruins from the north

St Mary's is a small church, measuring 30 feet by 12 feet 3 inches (about 9.1 by 3.7 m). It dates from the late medieval period, and was constructed using rubble masonry and large stones. It had a slate roof, although most of the roof has now gone, and there is a bellcote at the west end, which may be original rather than a later addition. There is no physical division between the nave and the chancel, although one account in the 19th century said that there had originally been a screen separating them, and some traces of it still remained at that time.

Entrance to the church was through a doorway with a square head, in the north wall at the west end; this dates from the 19th century. An inscribed stone near the doorway has the date 1798 and some initials, and it has been suggested that this marked the date of some renovation work. There are two windows on the south wall, one fully blocked and one partially blocked. The small window at the east end of the church dates from the latter part of the 15th century.

Inside, little remains, but the ruins still have most of the original roof trusses (one, at the west end of the church, is a replacement). There are some slate memorial tablets on the walls, dating from the middle of the 19th century, and a plain 12th-century circular font. The 1937 survey noted a bell dating from 1717 and some portions of 17th-century panelled seating near the pulpit; these were not recorded when the church was given listed status in 1970.

== Assessment ==
St Mary's has national recognition and statutory protection from alteration as it has been designated as a Grade II listed building – the lowest of the three grades of listing, designating "buildings of special interest, which warrant every effort being made to preserve them". It was given this status on 12 May 1970 and has been listed because it is "a late Medieval church of exceptionally simple character". Cadw (the Welsh Government body responsible for the built heritage of Wales and the inclusion of Welsh buildings on the statutory lists) also notes that despite its "very poor condition", St Mary's "is a virtually unaltered late Medieval building (even retaining the original roof trusses) and in its isolation, is characteristic of many churches on the island."

Writing in 1859, the clergyman and antiquarian Harry Longueville Jones called it a "small, plain, single-aisled chapel", and said that one of the small south windows was "a good specimen of its kind." A 2006 guide to the churches of Anglesey says that the "roofless ruin" of St Mary's "has the distinction of probably being the most isolated church in Anglesey".
