= Valley Rural District =

Former local government area in the UK

Coordinates: 53.284°N 4.565°W

Valley
- Area
  - 1901: 58,813 acres (238.01 km^{2})
  - 1961: 58,784 acres (237.89 km^{2})
- Population
  - 1901: 10,472
  - 1971: 15,055
- History
  - Created: 1894
  - Abolished: 1974
  - Succeeded by: Ynys Môn – Isle of Anglesey
- Status: Rural District

Valley was a rural district part of the administrative county of Anglesey, Wales from 1894 to 1974.

The district was formed by the Local Government Act 1894 as the successor to Holyhead Rural Sanitary District. It took its name from the village of Valley which lay at the district centre.

The rural district was abolished in 1974, when the Local Government Act 1972 amalgamated all local authorities on the island into the single district of Ynys Môn – Isle of Anglesey.

== List of civil parishes ==
- Aberffraw
- Bodedern
- Bodwrog
- Ceirchiog
- Cerrigceinwen
- Henegwlys
- Llanddeusant
- Llandrygan
- Llanfaelog
- Llanfaethlu
- Llanfair yn Neubwll
- Llanfwrog
- Llangwyfan
- Llanfihangel yn Nhowyn
- Llanllibio
- Llanrhuddlad
- Llantrisant
- Llanynghenedl
- Llechylched
- Rhoscolyn
- Trewalchmai
