= Rhwydrys =

Welsh saint

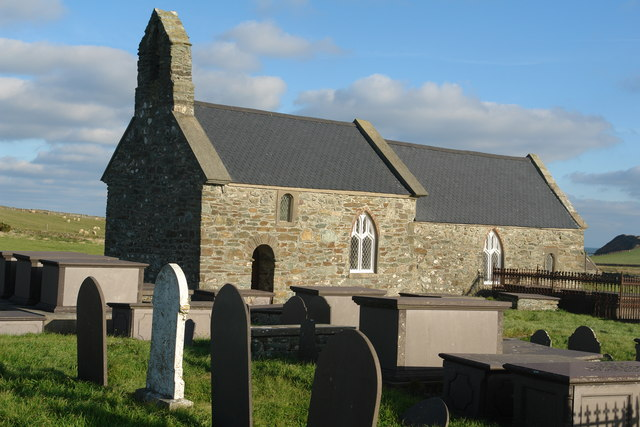
St Rhwydrys's Church, Llanrhwydrys

Rhwydrys is a 6th-century Irish pre-Congregational saint of Wales. His feast day is on 1 November.

The medieval Welsh genealogical tract, Bonedd y Saint, lists Rhwydrys as the son of Rodrem, king of Connacht in Ireland. Rhwydrys is believed to have built a chapel in Llanrhwydrys on Anglesey in around 570 AD.

St Rhwydrys's Church in Llanrhwydrys is dedicated to him. This church was built in the 12th century on or near his former chapel.
