= Llwydiarth-Esgob =

Coordinates: 53.333576°N 4.350965°W

- Farm buildings at Llwydiarth-Esgob

- Location within Anglesey
- OS grid reference: SH 4355 8443
  - Cardiff: 137.3 mi (221.0 km)
  - London: 218.1 mi (351.0 km)
- Community: Rhosybol
- Principal area: Anglesey
- Country: Wales
- Sovereign state: United Kingdom
- Post town: Llannerch-y-medd
- Police: North Wales
- Fire: North Wales
- Ambulance: Welsh
- UK Parliament: Ynys Môn
- Senedd Cymru – Welsh Parliament: Ynys Môn

Llwydiarth-Esgob is an area in the community of Rhosybol, Anglesey, Wales, which is 137.3 miles (220.9 km) from Cardiff and 218.1 miles (350.9 km) from London. In the 18th century the poet Hugh Hughes lived on his estate here.

== See also ==
- List of localities in Wales by population
