= Hugh Hughes (poet) =

Welsh poet

Hugh Hughes (Y Bardd Coch) (22 March 1693 – 6 April 1776), also referred to as Huw ap Huw or Huw Huws, was a Welsh poet.

== Life ==
Born on 22 March 1693, he was son of Gruffydd Hughes, who claimed lineage, according to the Welsh genealogies, from Tegeryn ab Carwed, the lord of Twrcelyn. He was mainly self-educated, and generally lived on his estate at Llwydiarth Esgob, near Llanerchymedd, Anglesey. He died on 6 April 1776, and was buried in Holyhead churchyard.

== Legacy ==
Hughes left manuscripts containing poems, translations, tales, and biographies. Most of these came into the possession of his son, who succeeded to the estate, and of those some have since been lost; but some went the British Museum.

== Works ==
Hughes was a disciple of Lewis Morris, and practically ceased to write poetry after Morris's death. His verses were esteemed by Goronwy Owen.

He is one of the three Anglesey poets whose works are found in the Diddanwch Teuluaidd neu waith Beirdd Mon (London, 1763; 2nd edition, Carnarvon, 1817; 3rd edition, Liverpool, 1879). Other poems by him occur in the Blodeugerdd, Diddanwch i'w Feddianydd (Dublin, 1773), and Dewisol Ganiadau.

Hughes also published translations from English works:

- Deial Ahaz, wedi ei hysprydoli (1773) from The Dial of Ahaz Spiritualized by David Tucker;
- Deddfau Moesoldeb, copies not known to be extant; and
- Rheolau Bywyd Dynol (Dublin, 1774) from The Oeconomy of Human Life by Robert Dodsley and Philip Dormer Stanhope.

== Notes ==
Attribution

This article incorporates text from a publication now in the public domain: Lee, Sidney, ed. (1891). "Hughes, Hugh (1693-1776)". Dictionary of National Biography. Vol. 28. London: Smith, Elder & Co.
