= Melin Adda =

Windmill in Anglesey, Wales

Coordinates: 53.4030°N 4.3484°W

Melin Adda, Amlwch

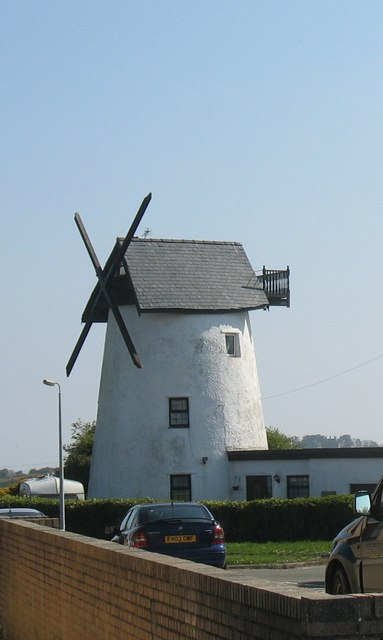

Melin Adda is a windmill near Amlwch, Anglesey, (OS reference: SH 440921) which was built in the 1790s and closed down in 1912. The mill was turned into a house in the 1970s. Nearby stood another mill, which was water driven, a much older mill, dating back to 1352.

In 1851 it is recorded that Owen Hughes the miller at the time was killed after being struck by the sail's boom.

== Nearby windmills in the Amlwch area ==
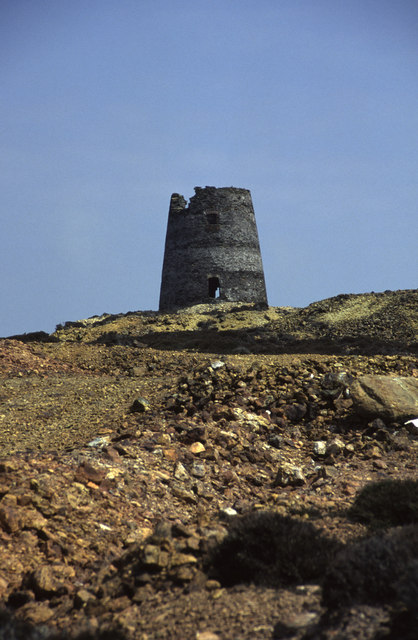
Melin Mynydd Parys

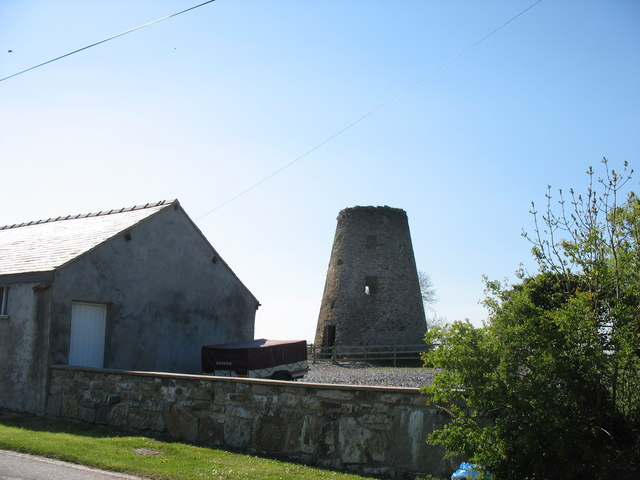
Melin Llidiart

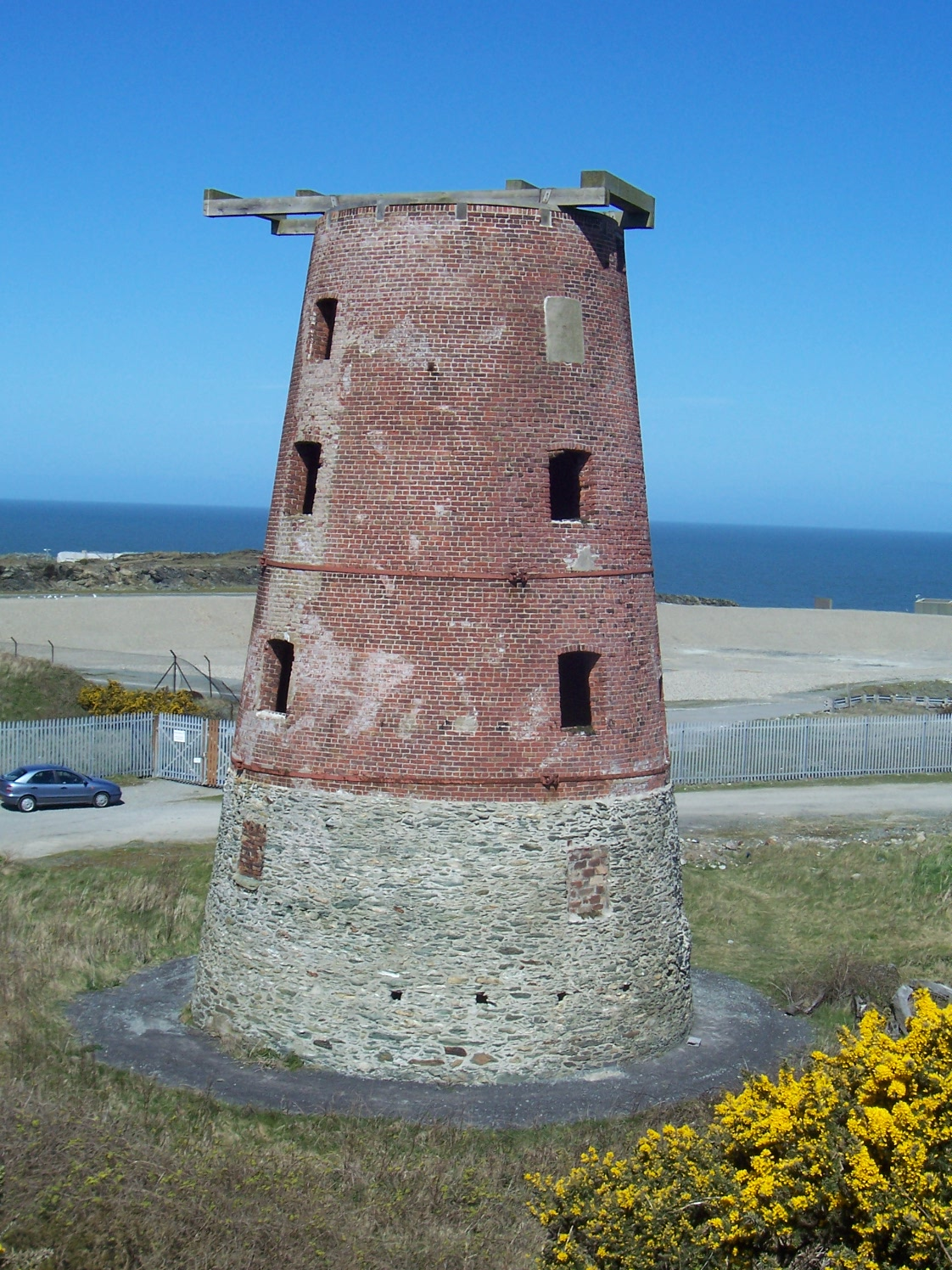
Melin y Borth, Amlwch
