= Penbol =

Hamlet in Anglesey, Wales

Coordinates: 53.36514°N 4.401293°W

- Location within Anglesey
- OS grid reference: SH 4032 8805
  - Cardiff: 140.1 mi (225.5 km)
  - London: 221.1 mi (355.8 km)
- Community: Rhosybol
- Principal area: Anglesey
- Country: Wales
- Sovereign state: United Kingdom
- Post town: Rhosgoch
- Police: North Wales
- Fire: North Wales
- Ambulance: Welsh
- UK Parliament: Ynys Môn
- Senedd Cymru – Welsh Parliament: Ynys Môn

Penbol is a hamlet in the community of Rhosybol, Anglesey, Wales, which is 140.1 miles (225.5 km) from Cardiff and 221.1 miles (355.7 km) from London.

== See also ==
- List of localities in Wales by population
