= Cylch-y-Garn =

Community in Anglesey, Wales

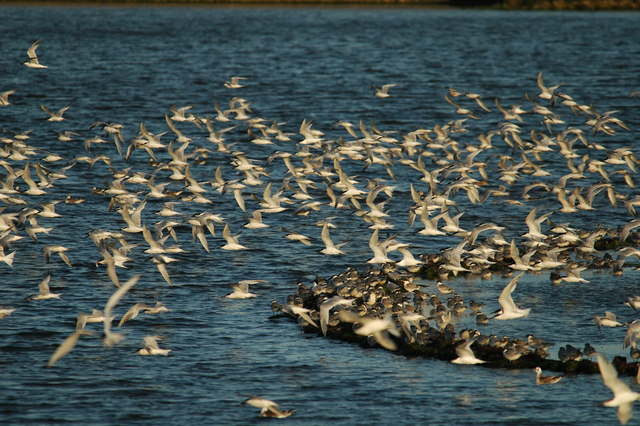
- Terns at Cemlyn Bay

- Location within Anglesey
- Population: 758 (2011)
- OS grid reference: SH3290
- Community: Cylch-y-Garn
- Principal area: Anglesey
- Preserved county: Gwynedd
- Country: Wales
- Sovereign state: United Kingdom
- Post town: HOLYHEAD
- Postcode district: LL65
- Dialling code: 01407
- Police: North Wales
- Fire: North Wales
- Ambulance: Welsh
- UK Parliament: Ynys Môn
- Senedd Cymru – Welsh Parliament: Ynys Môn
- List of places UK Wales Anglesey 53.385°N 4.520°W Map of the community

Cylch-y-Garn is a community in Anglesey, Wales, located on the north west coast of the county, 9.0 miles (14.5 km) west of Amlwch, 12.5 miles (20.1 km) north east of Holyhead and 15.0 miles (24.1 km) north west of Llangefni. It includes the villages of Llanfair-yng-Nghornwy, Llanrhyddlad and Rhydwyn, plus Llanrhwydrys, Caerau and Cemlyn. the north west tip of the island at Carmel Head, and the offshore islands of the Skerries and West Mouse. At the 2001 census the community had a population of 675, increasing to 758 at the 2011 census.

St Mary's Church at Llanfair-yng-Nghornwy is of early medieval origin and has a chancel arch dating from the 11th or 12th century. It is mentioned in the Norwich Taxation of 1254. The chancel was lengthened in the 15th century, and a south chapel added in the 16th. The west tower was added in the 17th century, and the church was restored in 1847, and again in both 1860 and the 1930s. Cadw considers it to be "a fine rural parish church, incorporating significant early medieval fabric", and claims that it is "of special interest, therefore, both for its early origins and for the quality of its later detail," and it is Grade I listed.

Saint Rhwydrus's Church, near Cemlyn Bay, was also built in the 12th century, but only the nave survives, although of particular interest is a doorway to the nave dating from that period. It is Grade II* listed, as is Caerau, a late 17th-century house in Llanfair-yng-Nghornwy which contains original panelling.

Cemlyn Bay is located in the north east of the community, and is owned by the National Trust. It is the site of a nature reserve managed by the North Wales Wildlife Trust, which includes a lagoon separated from the sea by Esgair Gemlyn, a shingle ridge formed by longshore drift. Islands in the lagoon provide nesting sites for common and Arctic terns, and for one of the United Kingdom's largest breeding populations of Sandwich terns.

Offshore, the Skerries lie north west of Carmel Head at the end of a submerged reef which lies directly in the path of shipping traveling between Liverpool and Ireland. In 1714 Queen Anne granted William Trench the right to build a lighthouse on the rocks, and to levy dues on passing ships. The light came into operation in 1717, but ship owners evaded payment, and Trench died in 1729, heavily in debt. The lighthouse was eventually bought by Trinity House in 1841, the last privately owned lighthouse in the British Isles purchased by the organisation. The coal grate was replaced by an oil lamp in 1804, and converted to electric operation in 1927. Since 1987 it has been unmanned, and controlled automatically from Harwich.
