= Brynhyfryd =

Brynhyfryd may refer to:

- Brynhyfryd, Aberdare
- Brynhyfryd, Bargoed
- Brynhyfryd, Caerphilly
- Brynhyfryd, Cwmbran
- Brynhyfryd, Llanelli
- Brynhyfryd, Neath
- Brynhyfryd, Swansea
- Brynhyfryd, Wrexham

See also: Ysgol Brynhyfryd secondary school, Denbighshire
