= Rhosgoch =

Village in Anglesey, Wales

Coordinates: 53.375°N 4.392°W

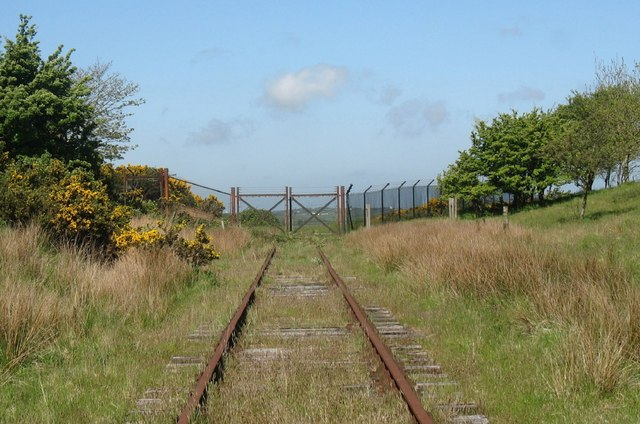
- Entrance gate on the railway spur at the former Rhosgoch oil terminal

- Location within Anglesey
- Community: Rhosybol
- Principal area: Isle of Anglesey
- Country: Wales
- Sovereign state: United Kingdom
- Police: North Wales
- Fire: North Wales
- Ambulance: Welsh

Rhosgoch (Welsh pronunciation; meaning: 'red moor') is a small village in the community of Rhosybol, in the north of the island of Anglesey, Wales, about 3.5 miles (5.6 km) to the south-west of Amlwch.

A short distance to the west of the village is the small lake Llyn Hafodol and a mile to the south is Anglesey's largest body of water: the reservoir Llyn Alaw (Water Lily Lake).

The village once had a station on the Anglesey Central Railway. Although the tracks still exist, no train has run on them since 1993. Also connected to the railway was a short south-west facing spur that led to an oil terminal. This was linked to a floating dock in the sea off Amlwch, where super-tankers could dock in all tides and feed oil via Rhosgoch and a pipeline to Stanlow oil refinery. This operation lasted for 16 years between 1974 and 1990.

The first tornado of the record-breaking 1981 United Kingdom tornado outbreak, an F1/T2 tornado, touched down close to Rhosgoch at around 10:19 local time on 23 November 1981.
