= Penygraigwen =

Coordinates: 53.365672°N 4.336427°W

- Location within Anglesey
- OS grid reference: SH 4463 8797
  - Cardiff: 138.9 mi (223.5 km)
  - London: 218.5 mi (351.6 km)
- Community: Rhosybol
- Principal area: Anglesey
- Country: Wales
- Sovereign state: United Kingdom
- Post town: Penysarn
- Police: North Wales
- Fire: North Wales
- Ambulance: Welsh
- UK Parliament: Ynys Môn
- Senedd Cymru – Welsh Parliament: Ynys Môn

Penygraigwen is a village in the community of Rhosybol, Anglesey, Wales, which is 138.9 miles (223.6 km) from Cardiff and 218.5 miles (351.6 km) from London.

== See also ==
- List of localities in Wales by population
