= Tregele =

Village in Anglesey, Wales

Coordinates: 53.404°N 4.474°W

Tregele is a small village located in Llanbadrig community, in north Anglesey, Wales. Located about a mile south-west of the larger coastal village of Cemaes, it is also close to the Wylfa Nuclear Power Station now decommissioning on Wylfa Head. Despite its small size Tregele has a well stocked store and off licence incorporating a post office and petrol station. One kilometre south of the village is a cromlech (ancient burial chamber) named Llanfechell Cromlech.
