= Aethwy Rural District =

Rural district in the administrative county of Anglesey, Wales, from 1894 to 1974

Coordinates: 53.168°N 4.332°W

Aethwy
- Area
  - 1911: 36,551 acres (147.92 km^{2})
  - 1961: 52,352 acres (211.86 km^{2})
- Population
  - 1901: 8,717
  - 1971: 12,011
- History
  - Created: 1894
  - Abolished: 1974
  - Succeeded by: Ynys Môn - Isle of Anglesey
- Status: Rural District
  - HQ: Llanfairpwllgwyngyll

Aethwy was a rural district in the administrative county of Anglesey, Wales, from 1894 to 1974.

It was created under the Local Government Act 1894 from the part of the Bangor rural sanitary district which was on Anglesey.

In 1933 it was expanded by a county review order, taking in all of the abolished Dwyran Rural District.

The district was abolished under the Local Government Act 1972, becoming part of a single Ynys Môn - Isle of Anglesey district.

== Civil parishes ==
Over its existence the rural district contained the following civil parishes:

- Llandegfan
- Llanddaniel
- Llanddona
- Llanfair Pwllgwyngyll
- Llanfihangel Ysgeifiog
- Llangadwaladr
- Llangaffo†
- Llangeinwen†
- Llangoed
- Llangristiolus
- Llaniestyn Rural
- Llannidan†
- Llansadwrn
- Newborough†
- Penmynydd
- Pentraeth
- Trefdraeth

†In Dwyran RD until 1933.
