= St Mary's Church, Llannerch-y-medd =

Coordinates: 53.33003°N 4.37747°W

St Mary's Church
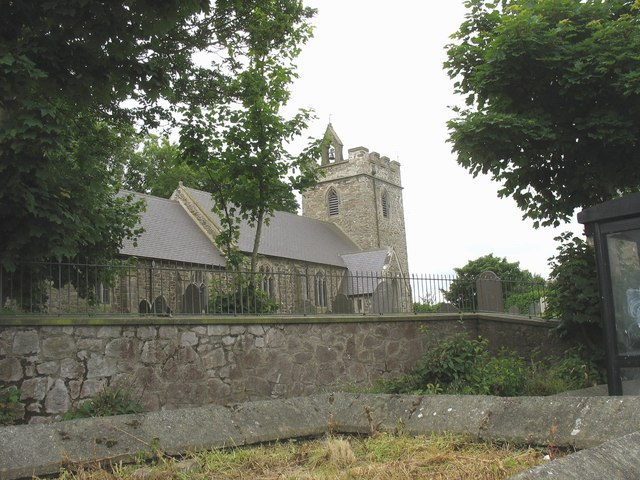
- St Mary's Church
- Country: Wales
- Denomination: Church in Wales

Architecture
- Heritage designation: Grade II
- Designated: 5 December 1970
- Architectural type: Church
- Style: Medieval

St Mary's Church is a medieval church in the town of Llannerch-y-medd, Anglesey, Wales. St Mary's Church is dedicated to Saint Mary. The east doorway in the tower and other parts of the tower probably date to the 12th century. It was extensively rebuilt in 1850 by the architect Henry Kennedy of Bangor. It was designated a Grade II-listed building on 5 December 1970.

By 2003 the church had closed as a result of being unable to afford repairs to the building, however as of 2026 the church holds services twice a month.
