= St Rhwydrys's Church, Llanrhwydrys =

Church in Anglesey, Wales

Coordinates: 53.4091°N 4.5258°W

St Rhwydrys's Church
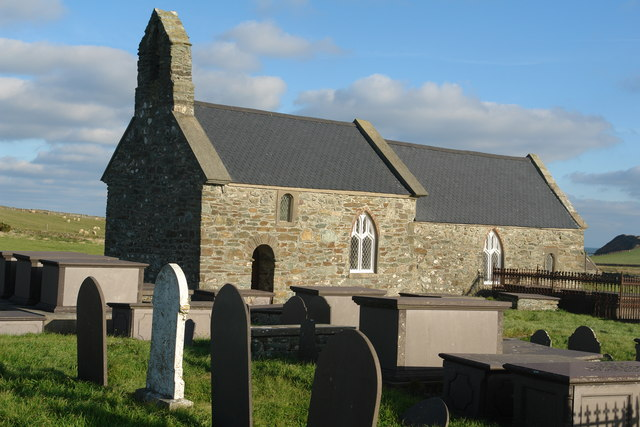
- St Rhwydrys's Church
- Country: Wales
- Denomination: Church in Wales

History
- Dedication: Rhwydrys

Architecture
- Heritage designation: Grade II*
- Designated: 12 May 1970
- Architectural type: Church
- Style: Medieval

St Rhwydrys's Church is a medieval church near the village of Cemlyn on the Isle of Anglesey in Wales. The building dates from the mid-12th century and underwent renovations in the 19th century. It was designated a Grade II*-listed building on 12 May 1970.

== History and location ==
Dedicated to Saint Rhwydrys, the church is situated in an isolated location near Cemlyn. It was first mentioned in the Norwich Taxation of 1254. The oldest part of the structure dates from the 12th century, which consists of the nave and rounded doorway. It was granted Grade II*-listed status on 12 May 1970.
