= Llanrhuddlad =

Hamlet in Anglesey, Wales

Coordinates: 53.371691°N 4.508771°W

Llanrhuddlad: Llanrhyddlad
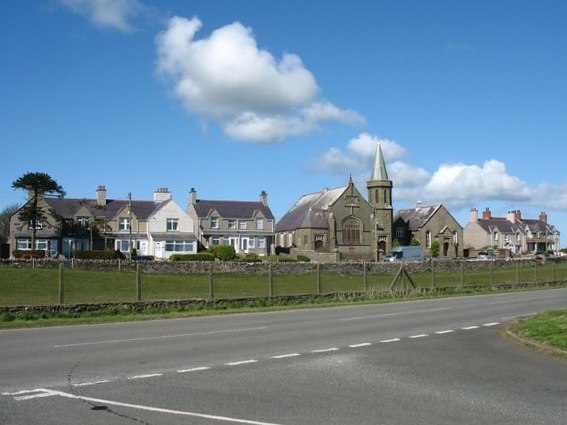

- Location within Anglesey
- OS grid reference: SH 3319 8903
  - Cardiff: 142.2 mi (228.8 km)
  - London: 225 mi (362 km)
- Community: Cylch-y-Garn
- Principal area: Anglesey
- Preserved county: Gwynedd
- Country: Wales
- Sovereign state: United Kingdom
- Post town: Holyhead
- Police: North Wales
- Fire: North Wales
- Ambulance: Welsh
- UK Parliament: Ynys Môn
- Senedd Cymru – Welsh Parliament: Bangor Conwy Môn

Llanrhuddlad, also spelled Llanrhyddlad, is a hamlet in Anglesey, in north-west Wales. It is located in the community of Cylch-y-Garn, 5 miles (8.0 km) from Holyhead, 142 miles (229 km) from Cardiff and 225 miles (362 km) from London. Until 1984, Llanrhuddlad was a community itself.

== Geography ==
Llyn Llygeirian, 1 1/2 miles (2.4 km) to the south-east, abounds in flora and fringing marshland. The Anglesey Coastal Path passes nearby.

== Notable resident ==
Morris Williams, a poet in Welsh and a theologian, served as Llanrhuddlad's Anglican rector from 1859 until his death on 3 January 1874. He completed a Welsh metrical version of the Psalms (Y Psallwyr, neu Psalmau Dafydd) in 1850.

== See also ==
- List of localities in Wales by population
