= Carmel, Anglesey =

Hamlet in Anglesey, Wales

Coordinates: 53.313622°N 4.421012°W

Carmel
- Location within Anglesey
- OS grid reference: SH 3881 8236
  - Cardiff: 137.1 mi (220.6 km)
  - London: 219.8 mi (353.7 km)
- Community: Llannerch-y-medd
- Principal area: Anglesey
- Country: Wales
- Sovereign state: United Kingdom
- Post town: Llannerch-y-medd
- Police: North Wales
- Fire: North Wales
- Ambulance: Welsh
- UK Parliament: Ynys Môn
- Senedd Cymru – Welsh Parliament: Ynys Môn

Carmel is a hamlet in Anglesey, Wales, located 8 miles east of Holyhead and 2 miles south-west of Llannerch-y-medd. It is served by the route 63 bus from Llannerch-y-medd to Bangor.

== See also ==
- List of localities in Wales by population
