= Cemlyn =

Hamlet in Anglesey, Wales

Coordinates: 53.405629°N 4.512765°W

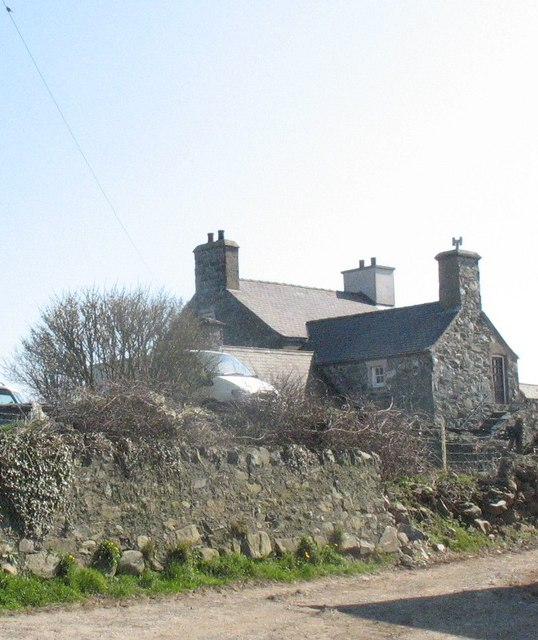

- Location within Anglesey
- Principal area: Anglesey
- Preserved county: Gwynedd
- Country: Wales
- Sovereign state: United Kingdom
- Police: North Wales
- Fire: North Wales
- Ambulance: Welsh
- UK Parliament: Ynys Môn
- Senedd Cymru – Welsh Parliament: Bangor Conwy Môn

Cemlyn is a hamlet in Anglesey, in north-west Wales. It lies near Cemlyn Bay. It is in the community of Cylch-y-Garn.
