= Rhydwyn =

Village in Anglesey, Wales

Coordinates: 53.370°N 4.534°W

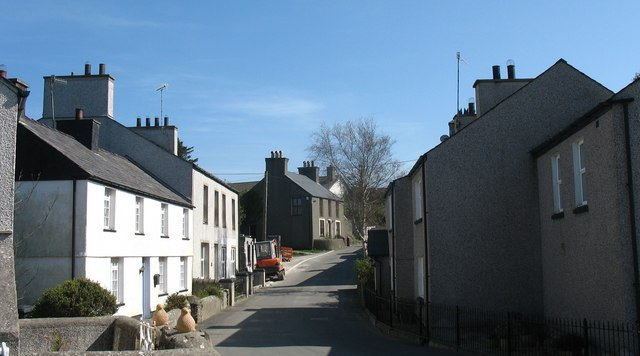
- village centre

- Location within Anglesey
- OS grid reference: SH 31517 88968
  - Cardiff: 142.5 mi (229.3 km)
  - London: 225.7 mi (363.2 km)
- Community: Cylch-y-Garn
- Principal area: Anglesey
- Country: Wales
- Sovereign state: United Kingdom
- Post town: Holyhead
- Postcode district: LL65
- Police: North Wales
- Fire: North Wales
- Ambulance: Welsh
- UK Parliament: Ynys Môn
- Senedd Cymru – Welsh Parliament: Bangor Conwy Môn

Rhydwyn (Welsh pronunciation; Rhyd-Wyn) is a village in the community of Cylch-y-Garn, in the north west of Anglesey, Wales. Rhydwyn is named after a little stream that once crossed the centre of the village. "Rhyd" meaning Ford and "Wyn" white. It now runs through a culvert under the road.
