= Mynydd Mechell =

Coordinates: 53.378974°N 4.474957°W

- Location within Anglesey
- OS grid reference: SH 3547 8976
  - Cardiff: 141.9 mi (228.4 km)
  - London: 223.8 mi (360.2 km)
- Community: Mechell
- Principal area: Anglesey
- Country: Wales
- Sovereign state: United Kingdom
- Post town: Amlwch
- Police: North Wales
- Fire: North Wales
- Ambulance: Welsh
- UK Parliament: Ynys Môn
- Senedd Cymru – Welsh Parliament: Ynys Môn

Mynydd Mechell is an area in the community of Mechell, Anglesey, Wales, which is 141.9 miles (228.4 km) from Cardiff and 223.8 miles (360.2 km) from London.

== See also ==
- List of localities in Wales by population
