= Rhosybol =

Village and community in Anglesey, Wales

Coordinates: 53.368°N 4.368°W

- Village and community
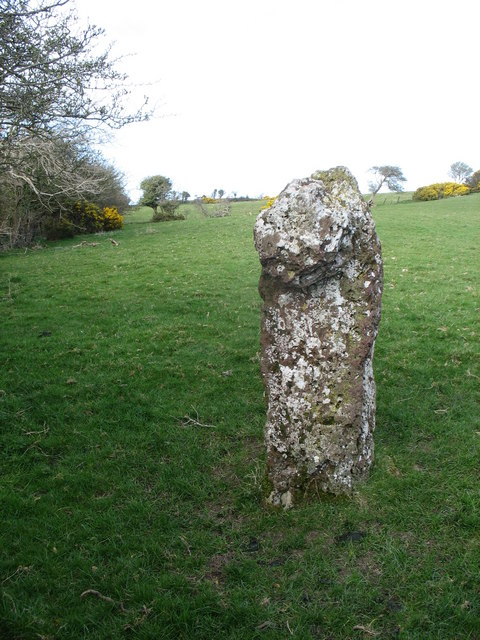

- Location within Anglesey
- Principal area: Isle of Anglesey
- Country: Wales
- Sovereign state: United Kingdom
- Police: North Wales
- Fire: North Wales
- Ambulance: Welsh
- List of places UK Wales Anglesey Map of the community

Rhosybol (Welsh for 'moor in the hollow') is a village and community in Anglesey, Wales. The community population at the 2011 census was 1,078. Located 2.5 miles (4.0 km) south of the town of Amlwch, the village is close to both Llyn Alaw, the largest body of water on the island, and Parys Mountain, the site of the historic copper mines which lies just to the north. It is to the mines that the village owes its existence as it was one of several built to house the miners. During the 1960s noted painter Kyffin Williams produced an oil painting of the village.

Rhosybol lies on the B5111 road from Amlwch to Llannerch-y-medd. Just to the east of the village is the Trysglwyn Wind Farm. This site covers an area of about 100 hectares (250 acres) and is operated by RWE Innogy International. Much of the land is pasture where livestock can graze to the foot of the turbines. A pond has been provided and patches of woodland have been planted to enhance the wildlife value of the site. An information board is situated at the site entrance about 250 metres (270 yd) southeast of the farm of Trysglwyn Fawr.

Rhosybol has a Post office which is incorporated within its small corner shop. There is also a primary school for boys and girls between the ages of 4 and 11, in the playground of which is the village's war memorial clock tower. The memorial is unusual in that it only shows the names of those who fell in the First World War and not those in the Second. The village church is named Christ Church and is now disused, and so is the chapel named Bethania, but a further chapel named Capel Gorslwyd is still open and here services are still held. The village sits on the north east of Anglesey.

There is a Welsh-medium primary school, Ysgol Gynradd Rhosybol, located in the village. As of January 2018, the school had the second highest percentage of pupils (aged 5 and over) who spoke Welsh at home in Anglesey, at 79%.

Villages and hamlets in the community include Llandyfrydog, Rhosgoch, Penbol and Penygraigwen.
