= Llanfflewyn =

Coordinates: 53.372743°N 4.482266°W

- Location within Anglesey
- OS grid reference: SH 3496 8908
  - Cardiff: 141.9 mi (228.4 km)
  - London: 224.1 mi (360.7 km)
- Community: Mechell
- Principal area: Anglesey
- Country: Wales
- Sovereign state: United Kingdom
- Post town: Amlwch
- Police: North Wales
- Fire: North Wales
- Ambulance: Welsh
- UK Parliament: Ynys Môn
- Senedd Cymru – Welsh Parliament: Bangor Conwy Môn

Llanfflewyn is a village in the community of Mechell, Anglesey, Wales. St Fflewin's Church is located in the village.

== See also ==
- List of localities in Wales by population
