= Llanfechell =

Village in Anglesey, Wales

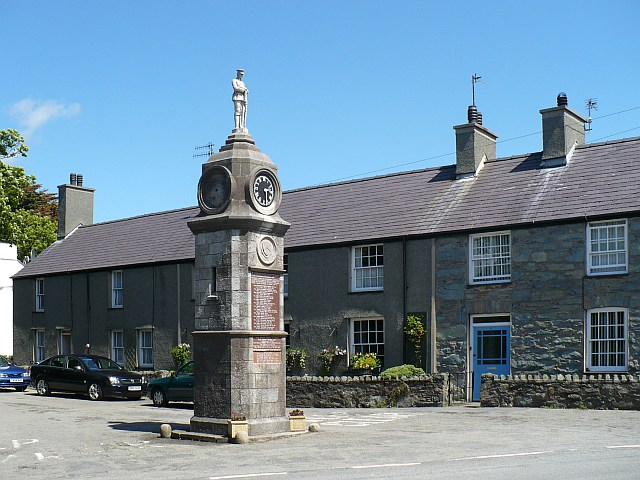

- Location within Anglesey
- Population: 1,293
- OS grid reference: SH369912
- Principal area: Anglesey
- Preserved county: Gwynedd
- Country: Wales
- Sovereign state: United Kingdom
- Post town: Amlwch
- Postcode district: LL68
- Police: North Wales
- Fire: North Wales
- Ambulance: Welsh
- UK Parliament: Ynys Môn
- Senedd Cymru – Welsh Parliament: Bangor Conwy Môn

Llanfechell (from Welsh: llan church + Saint Mechell) is a village in Anglesey, Wales. It is the largest of several small villages and dispersed settlements that make up Mechell Community Council area. Until 1984, Llanfechell was a community itself. It is 11 miles (18 km) east of Holyhead, and 5.6 miles (9 km) west of Amlwch, in the north of the island.

Mechell Community (which also includes the small villages of Mynydd Mechell and Carreglefn) had a 2001 population of 1,532, decreasing to 1,293 in 2011. Village services include a church, a community cafe/,hub, allotments, a primary school, a pub and two chapels. It is an agricultural area, and has been a local centre for markets, livestock fairs, and had both a watermill and a windmill. The area round about has many prehistoric monuments.

== History ==
The many prehistoric remains close to the village indicate that the area has been lived in for thousands of years. The first written mention of Llanfechell itself is in 1291. The name Llanfechell means Church of St Mechell (In the lenitive (treiglad meddal) the 'M' becomes 'F', pronounced V.). Mechell (or Mechyll) appears to have been a 6th-century missionary, possibly from Brittany, who founded a monastery here. He is said to have been the son of Echwydd and the grandson of Gwyn Gohoyw, who flourished in the 5th century. A 17th century manuscript (Llanstephan MS. 125) records a Welsh poem, Cywydd i Fechell Sant. This describes how St Mechell was offered a gift of land in gratitude for a miraculous healing, to be demarcated by the route of a released hare. The hare, under divine guidance, marked the full extent of what is now the parish of Llanfechell, where he then founded the monastery.

18th century life in Llanfechell was described in great detail by William Bulkeley (1691–1760). From 1734 to 1760 he kept a daily diary recording Anglesey life, social customs, personal and family dealings, farming practices and the weather. William Bulkeley lived at Brynddu as Squire of Llanfechell. His daughter married Fortunatus Wright, a brewer from Liverpool whose colourful life included periods as a privateer.

Llanfechell was one of a network of market towns on Anglesey. During the 18th century and following, in addition to its weekly market day the village held a fair several times a year, for the sale of livestock and produce. The Llanfechell Fair (Welsh: Ffair Mechell) no longer includes livestock and agricultural sales, but continues as a horticultural show and family fun day at Llanfechell Community School in late July.

A war memorial in the village square records those from the village who died in both world wars, three sons of Brigadier-General Owen Thomas of Brynddu, who headed Lloyd George's Welsh Army.

== Community activities ==
'Menter Mechell' is an umbrella community venture, which helps facilitate a variety of activities and interest groups in the village. Areas of activity include the History Group, a Hobbies Group, the Maes Martin playground and sports project and an Allotment Group.

== Church and chapels ==
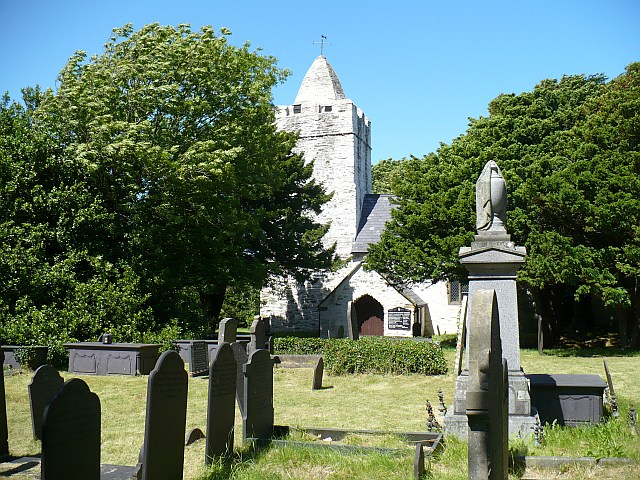
Llanfechell Parish Church

St Mechell's Church includes features that date back to the 12th century. It is a Grade II* listed building in the centre of the village (location:53.3930°N 4.4536°W, SH369913). St Mechell's Day is 15 November. The thick stone walls are whitewashed externally, while the stone tower has a single bell, and is topped by an unusual cupola. The church is part of the Anglican Church in Wales, in the diocese of Bangor, and holds bilingual services at 10.00am each Sunday.

Facing the church across the village square is Libanus Chapel (Welsh Calvinistic Methodist). Founded in 1832, it was rebuilt in 1903. Ebenezer Chapel, a Welsh Independent chapel, is near the school on Mountain Road. Built in 1862, it replaced a chapel built soon after 1800. Both chapels are listed grade II.

== Buildings ==
In addition to the three churches, there are six other listed buildings within the village (all grade II):

- Brynddu (listed in 2001), is a large 17th to 18th century house 440 yards (400 m) south-east of the village. (Location: 53.3924°N 4.4479°W, SH37329119. There was a medieval building which the diarist William Bulkeley began to rebuild in the 1690s. Brynddu estate has been in the hands of the Bulkeley family and their descendants for 500 years. It is now a 900-acre farming estate with five long-term tenant farmers in the locality, as well as 70 acres farmed directly from Brynddu. Since 2006 it has been the home of Robin Grove-White, formerly director of CPRE and chair of Greenpeace UK.
- Crown Terrace, including Crown House. A row of three listed terraced buildings on the corner of the Square.
- The Old Rectory, a 17th-century rectory, with 18th century additions, in grounds alongside the churchyard and Crown Terrace.
- Llanfechell War Memorial, which incorporates a clock, and stands in the village square. 53.3924°N 4.4525°W, SH37029120

== Ancient sites ==
There are four scheduled monuments close to the village:

=== Baron Hill Maen Hir ===
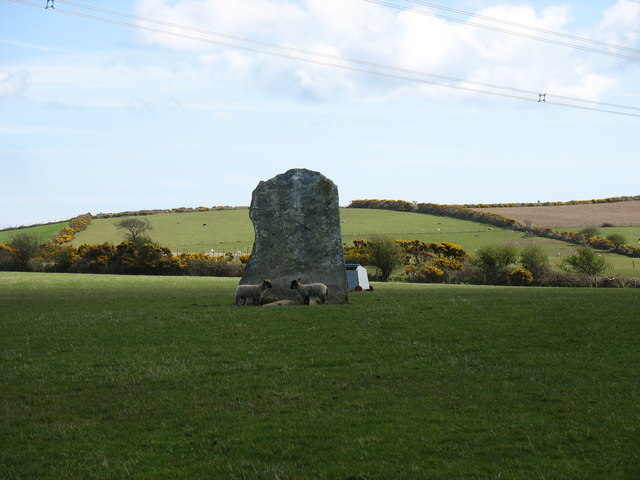
Baron Hill Maen Hir, a standing stone north-east of Llanfechell

The standing stone 440 yards north of Llanfechell Church, known as Baron Hill Maen Hir, is a prehistoric standing stone (one of many such on Anglesey). The stone is 6.6 feet (2.0 m) high, with a further 19 in (0.5m) below ground and weighs 4.6 tons. In 2009 it had keeled over, and in 2010 it was lifted and re-set in position by Gwynedd Archaeological Trust under the guidance of Cadw. When removed from its socket, some 20 packing stones were found around its base, one of which had two 'pecked' engravings, a cupmark and a cup and ring mark. The engraved stone is now at Oriel Ynys Môn Museum, Llangefni. Such rock engravings are very rare in North Wales, and its use as part of the construction of the standing stone implies a particular, if unknown, significance. It is Located at 53.3964°N 4.4531°W, grid reference SH369916.

=== Llanfechell Triangle ===
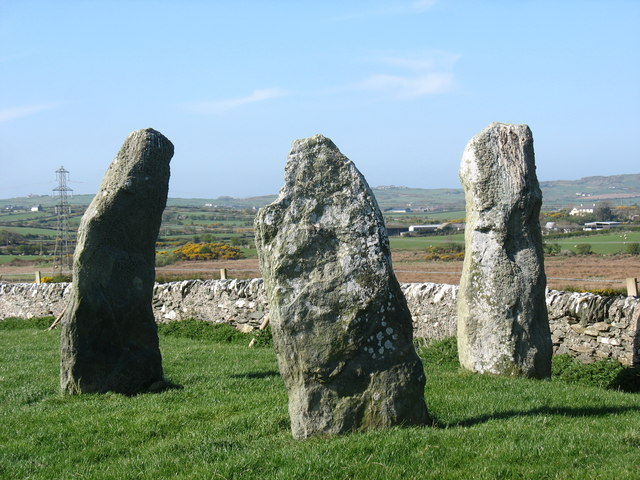
The Llanfechell Triangle

The Llanfechell Triangle Standing Stones are a group of three prehistoric standing stones at 53.3966°N 4.46204°W, grid reference SH363916. They are all around 6.6 feet (2.0 m) high with their long axis aligned NW-SE. They are thought to date to the Bronze Age.

=== Pen-y-Morwydd Barrow ===
Pen-y-Morwydd Barrow, is a burial mound, probably from the Bronze Age, on the top of a hill between Llanfechell and Bodewryd. It is 27 yards (25 m) across, and 6.6 feet (2.0 m) high, crossed by a modern wall. A footpath from Rhosbeirio crosses the mound. (Location: 53.3933°N 4.4306°W, grid reference SH385913)

=== Llifad enclosure ===
Llifad enclosure is a later prehistoric pentagonal enclosure, 49 yards (45 m) across. It is a possible defended settlement a few hundred metres south of Pen-y-Morwydd Barrow, on the same hill, towards Carreglefn. Location: 53.3915°N 4.4302°W, grid reference SH384910

=== Other archaeological sites ===
In addition to the scheduled sites, a range of other archaeological and historic sites are known:

Hilltop enclosure at Carog
This has Neolithic settlement evidence with a circular defensive ditch dated to 800BC. Also 800-900AD house and domestic artifacts, excavated in 2010. Location: 53.4012°N 4.4491°W, SH373922
Burial chamber at Foel Fawr
or Stones near Cromlech Farm (It may just be a 'suggestive natural feature'). Location: 53.3993°N 4.4675°W, SH360920
Mynydd Groes Earthwork
a field enclosure, largely cleared. Location: 53.3940°N 4.4818°W, SH351915
Pen-y-Morwydd Pillow Mound
a medieval constructed rabbit warren. Up to 7 are recorded at this site, most no longer visible. Location: 53.3927°N 4.4304°W, SH385912
Enclosure
north-west of Llanfechell, roughly square, 16 yards across. Location: 53.3967°N 4.4622°W, SH364917
Tai Hen Cropmark Enclosure
An irregular rectilinear enclosure some 50 yards across Location: 53.3957°N 4.4325°W, SH384915

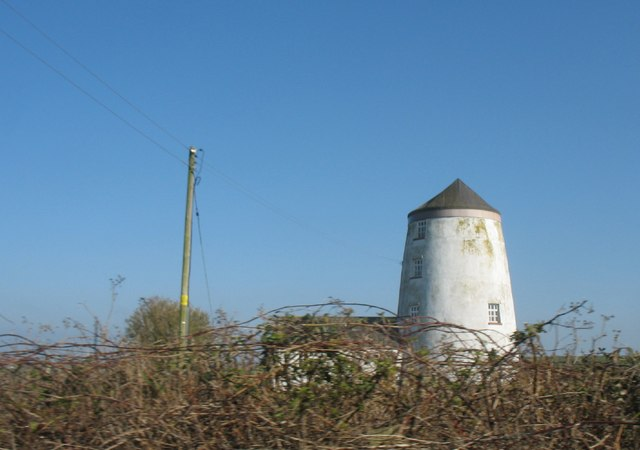
Melin Mechell Windmill

Pont-y-Plas Bridge
a road bridge with square headed arches and steps to the water. Location: 53.3937°N 4.4546°W, SH36889135
Meddanen Water Mill and Melin Mechell Windmill
(also known as Minffordd Mill and Melin Maen Arthur). Location: 53.3832°N 4.4642°W, SH362902 (these two Medieval mills are close together so could have been worked by the same miller, depending on wind or water supply). The windmill fell out of use in the early 20th century and was converted into a house in the late 1970s.

== Notable people ==
- Saint Mechell, the 6th century founder and first abbot of the monastery of Llanfechell
- William Jones (1675–1749), a mathematician, said to have introduced the symbol for the mathematical constant π, attended school in the village.
- William Bulkeley (1691–1760) a minor Welsh landowner and meticulous diarist; born in Brynddu in the parish of Llanfechell

== See also ==
- Mechell, Anglesey
- List of Scheduled Monuments in Anglesey
