= Carreglefn =

Village in Anglesey, Wales

Coordinates: 53.374841°N 4.432168°W

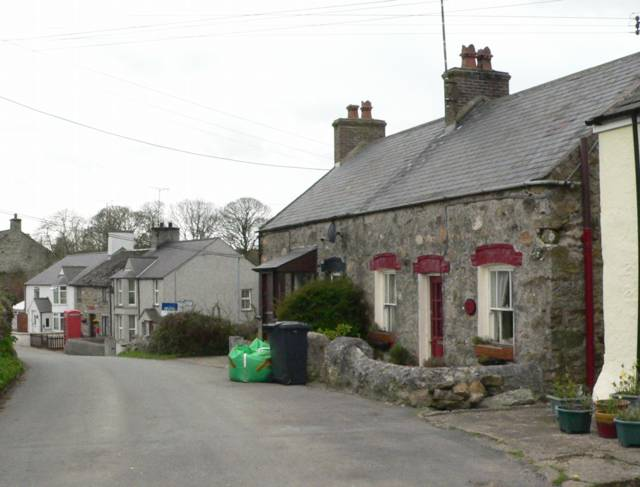

- Location within Anglesey
- Principal area: Anglesey
- Preserved county: Gwynedd
- Country: Wales
- Sovereign state: United Kingdom
- Post town: AMLWCH
- Postcode district: LL68
- Police: North Wales
- Fire: North Wales
- Ambulance: Welsh
- UK Parliament: Ynys Môn
- Senedd Cymru – Welsh Parliament: Ynys Môn

Carreglefn is a village in Anglesey, which is in north-west Wales, in the community of Mechell. Its name possibly means 'Smooth Stone'. The village has some walking routes around it. The covered reservoir south of Carreglefn, and near Llanol, is one of the highest points above sea level in the county. There is a Community Hall shared with Ysgol Carreglefn.

Until 1984, Carreglefn was a community.
