= Llannerch-y-medd =

Village and community in Anglesey, Wales

- The view of the square from Bridge Street

- Location within Anglesey
- Population: 1,360
- OS grid reference: SH419841
- Community: Llannerch-y-Medd
- Principal area: Anglesey
- Preserved county: Gwynedd
- Country: Wales
- Sovereign state: United Kingdom
- Post town: LLANERCHYMEDD
- Postcode district: LL71
- Dialling code: 01248
- Police: North Wales
- Fire: North Wales
- Ambulance: Welsh
- UK Parliament: Ynys Môn
- Senedd Cymru – Welsh Parliament: Bangor Conwy Môn
- List of places UK Wales Anglesey 53°19′49″N 4°22′32″W Map of the community

Llannerch-y-medd, sometimes spelt Llanerchymedd, is a small village and community on the Isle of Anglesey in North West Wales. In 2011, it had a population of 1,360, of whom more than 70% were Welsh speaking. It is historically a market town.

== History ==
Llannerch means "a woodland clearing". The word medd in the name is Welsh for mead, which is made from honey, and the name may be related to the production of honey for mead.

Evidence of human activity in the area dates back to approximately 3500 BCE. 1,500 years later, Cors-y-Bol, a large plot of mires that stretched from Llyn Alaw to Llandyfrydog and Clorach, was used as a burial site. Also around this time, a large number of standing stones were placed in and around the village, such as ones near the properties Llys Einion and Gwredog, as well as the nearby hamlet of Carmel. Clorach, a nearby plot of land, has been suggested as a settlement centre; however, as the area and property is largely agricultural, much evidence of prehistoric items or remains is lost.

Despite the record of a church and fairs throughout the 12th century, there is no mention of an official township until 1440. Neolithic and Bronze Age artefacts are still being found.

An example of the standing stones that surround the area.

Agricultural markets began to be held in the village in the 1600s; this market was the only one to be run on Anglesey other than the market at Beaumaris. In 1831 the first wool fair was held in Anglesey, with the location alternating between Llannerch-y-medd and Llangefni.

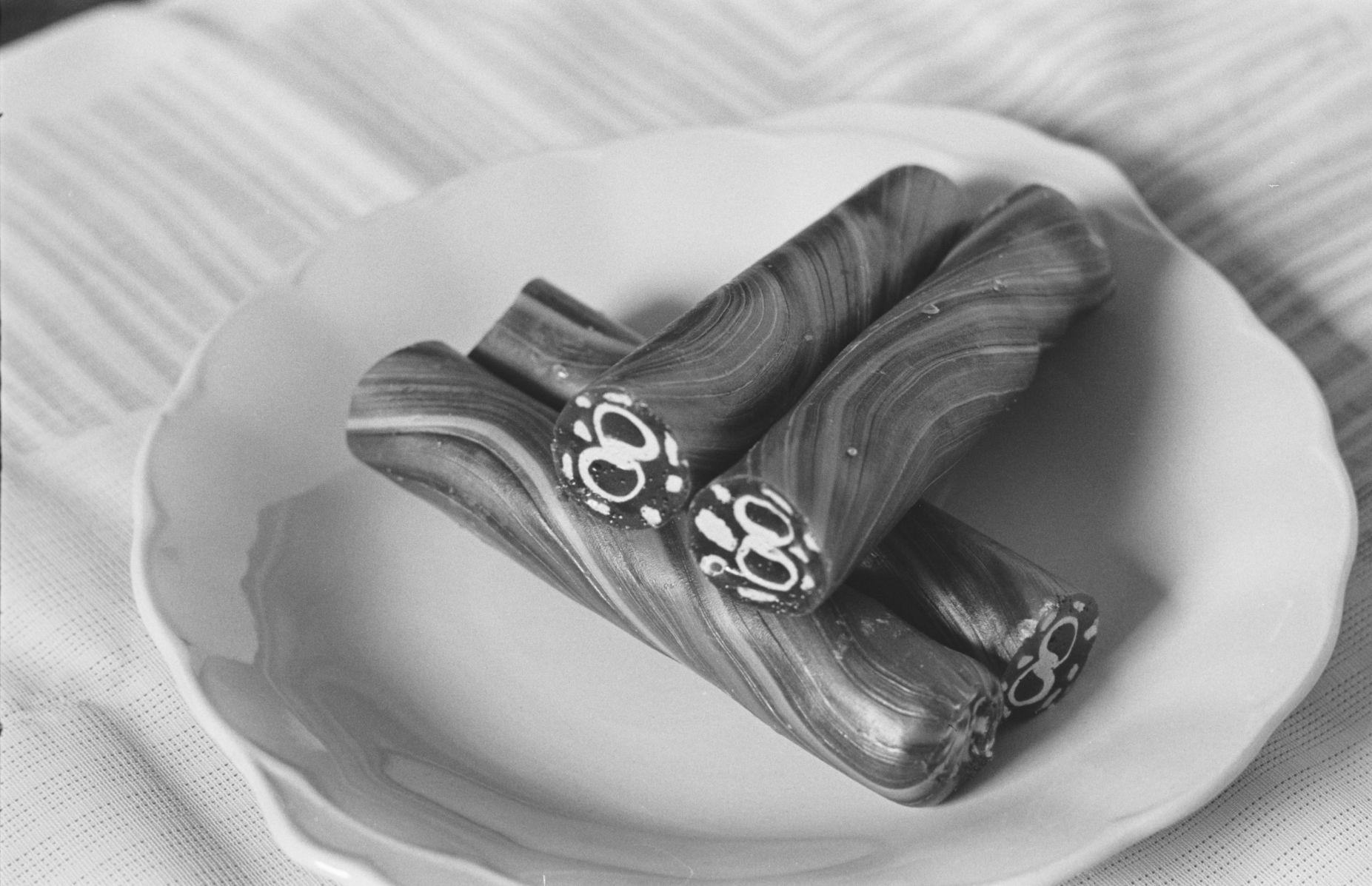
The classic ‘Number 8 Rock’ sold in the fairs.

Other industries in the village in the 1800s included the manufacturing of snuff and rock. It was also home to 250 shoemakers, who made the shoes for the miners in Parys Mountain.

Just to the northeast of the village is the hill called Pen y Foel, which is 123 m above sea level. Between 1951 and 1956 this was the site of a VHF Fixer station, part of the RAF Western Sector, and it was one of a number of similar sites managed by RAF Longley Lane near Preston in Lancashire. The site contained an octagonal wooden hut with a hand-steerable radio mast with two radio receivers of type R1392D, transmitter and telephone line. This hut was protected by a close surrounding octagonal brick wall to provide some bomb blast protection. The wall still exists. The station was used to allow each sector to locate RAF or allied aircraft and to help pilots find airfields in low cloud conditions. Also on the hill was a rectangular brick hut (now unroofed) also built by the RAF; this was a simple two-room hut with a rainwater collection tank. The site had three RAF wireless personnel (two were normally on duty) who were billeted with a landlady in Llannerch-y-Medd and attached to nearby RAF Valley. The site closed around 1956 as the technology was replaced by improved systems.

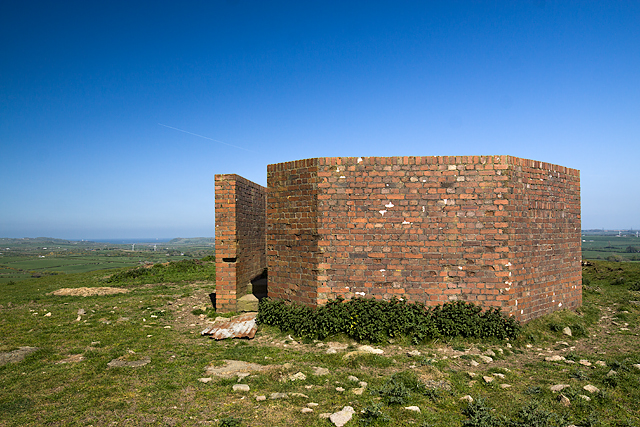
The brick hut that is still there today.

To the north of the village, along the B5111 to Amlwch, is an abandoned Victorian workhouse. It was erected in 1868 for 70 inmates, at a cost of £2,200. Several single-storey outbuildings surrounded the workhouse, including a vagrants' ward and an isolation block. It was abandoned in 1924, and despite several attempts to renovate it, it remains abandoned today.

A claim that Mary, the mother of Jesus, is buried in the village forms the subject of Graham Phillips's The Marian Conspiracy. Mary's traditional burial place is near Ephesus, in present-day Turkey.

== Governance ==
An electoral ward exists in the same name. This ward stretches to cover the Community of Tref Alaw with a total population taken at the 2011 census of 1,941.

== Geography ==
The village stands at an average of 73 metres above sea level. Llannerch-y-medd is surrounded almost entirely by farmland.

The village is situated near the centre of Anglesey, close to the large water supply reservoir, Llyn Alaw, and is believed to have an ancient foundation. The River Alaw flows beneath the settlement's infrastructure and comes out on the other side.

A much smaller village known as Carmel, located slightly south on Holyhead Road (B1152), is governmentally part of Llanerch-y-medd; as also are Bachau and Coedana, much smaller hamlets to the east of Llanerch-y-medd. Coedana was classed as a community until 1984, when it became part of the Llanerch-y-medd council area. Gwredog, a smaller hamlet within the Tref Alaw ward, is also governmentally situated in Llannerchymedd.

== Landmarks ==
In the outskirts of the village lies the Clorach Wells. These were the supposed meeting places of St. Seiriol and St. Cybi. The well was said to have sacred healing water. The well can still be seen today, it is beside a bridge in Llandyfrydog.

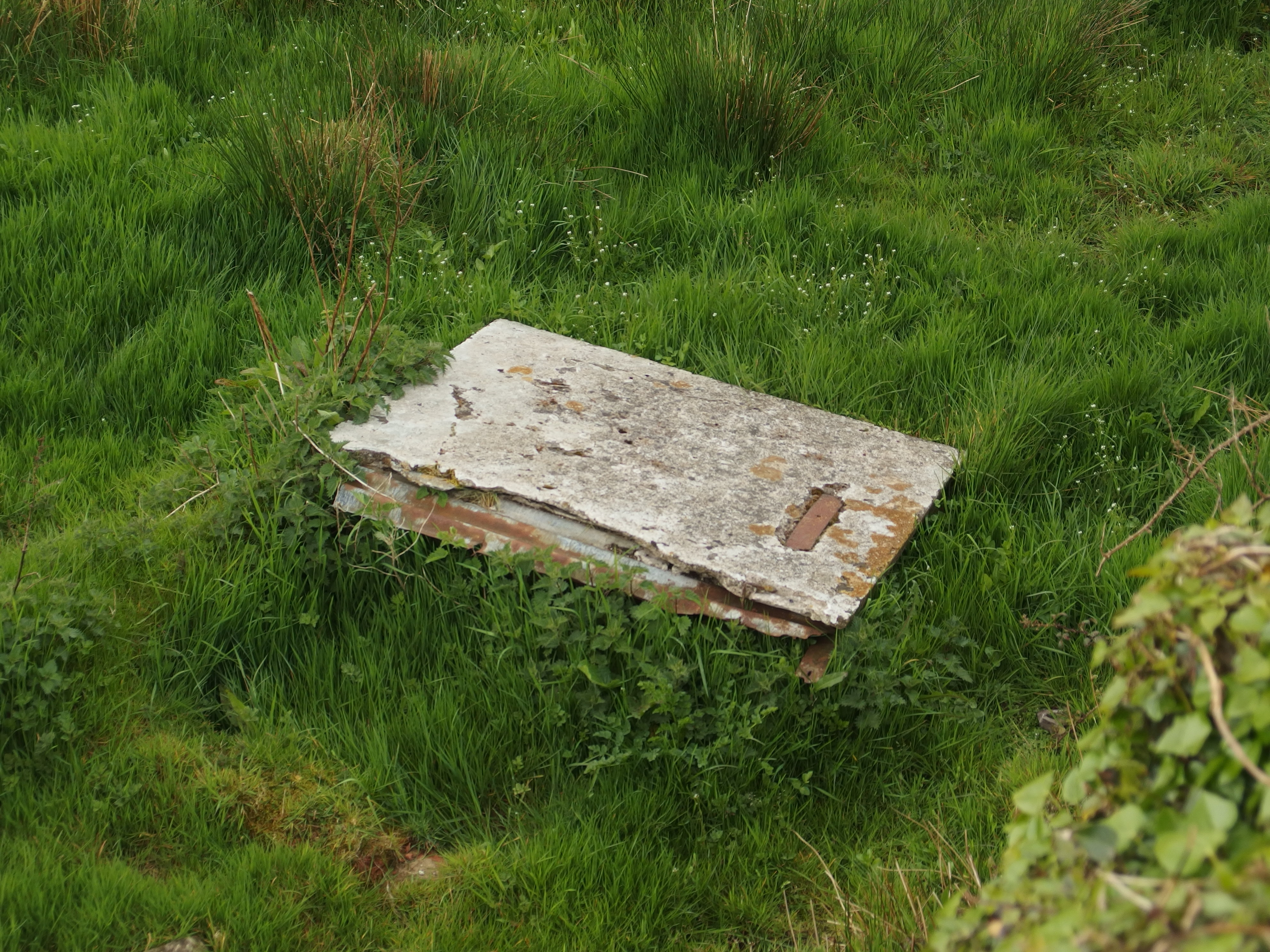
The well as seen from the side of the road, with presumably some newer additions.

To the far north of the village is Llwydiarth Fawr, a large property and Georgian mansion. It is associated with Tegerin ap Carwed, the lord of Twrcelyn around 1143. The present house on the property dates to the 17th century, it belonged to barrister David Lloyd. Then, in 1889, it was bought by an individual called William Jones, who became rich enough to afford it after being a builder in Liverpool. William then established brickworks on the land in 1900, of which flourished until 1922. It bares a similarity to Llwydiarth-Esgob, another property on the opposite side of the settlement.

Just outside the village is the Gallt-y-Benddu windmill. Construction on it began on the 8th of September, 1737, and was finished on the 24th of October, 1738, taking 1 year, 1 month and 11 days (411 days). This is the oldest windmill on Anglesey based on known dates. Through historical tax records and census, we can see that the earliest owners of the mill include Thomas Davis and then Evan Ellis in 1745, and then John Williams in 1763. By the 1840s, another individual called John Williams ran the windmill for a short amount of time, before John Jones took over, who was previously a miller at Melin Rhos Fawr in Brynteg. In 1841, two fatalities occurred at the mill. Anne Jones, the wife of John Jones, died while being struck by the sails due to standing too close to them while delivering grain to the mill. Later, a 4-year-old child died from the same cause. John Jones later moved to a different mill in Abergwyngregyn. His younger brother, John, took over in 1874, but changed his mind and began training as a preacher in 1881. This leaves 15-year-old Hugh, the youngest sibling, to own the mill. At this time, the windmill came under the parish of Coedana, and the owner of the surrounding acres was Edward Parry from Ceidio Farm. He runs it successfully for a decade, until he returned to Brynteg after his father’s death. Now, William Pritchard, who previously worked at Melin Llynon for his aunt, Anne Jones. The mill, warehouses, dwelling house and 18 acres of agricultural land were auctioned in 1898 as William moved in to own the farm of Brynhyfryd. Owen Roberts presided over the windmill and land until it lost its cap and sails during a large storm. It closed and was left at the turn of the 19th century. However, in 1964, things turned around when a man named Edgar Williams restored the building as a house.

== Clorach ==
About 1.5 miles to the east of the village is the old mansion of Clorach (today a farm), which was the home of Gwilym ap Tudur and a resort of bards in the Late Middle Ages. According to folk traditions which inspired poetry by Sir John Morris-Jones, the early saints Seiriol and Cybi used to meet every week in Clorach due to its central position in Anglesey. Lewis Morris was the first to mention this in the 18th century, As Seiriol walked both ways, there and back, with the sun behind him, he did not get a sun tan; but the opposite was the case for Cybi.

== Transport ==
The disused Anglesey Central Railway runs through the village. Its station, opened in 1866, was closed in 1964 as part of the Beeching Axe, and its goods yard is now a car park. There is now a cafe and tea rooms housed in a modern extension of the old buildings.

The railway with the bridge in the distance.

Accident

On 29 November 1877, heavy rainfall breached the Rhodogeidio mill dam. This caused a flash flood which overflowed the River Alaw, a river that flows through Llanerchymedd. Water emerged beneath the wooden bridge. The first train on that dark morning went head-first into the water,as the driver could not see that the bridge was gone. There were five passengers, one of whom survived. The casualties included 32-year old William Taylor, the driver, who was scalded and crushed across his body, and died the following morning in the Blue Bell (A historic inn in Llannerch-y-medd). John Davies, age 46, an inspector on the train, died right after the crash. John Saunderson, a 19 year old fireman, and Edward Hughes, a 35-year old guard, also died. A later report claimed that men working on the ruins found a lady's bag in the first class carriage. This makes them believe there was another passenger, but no bodies were found, and a part of an elastic boot was found, further supporting that possibility. This is not all that the heavy rain caused: two women who lived in a cottage nearby the mill dam had their rooms flooded. The bridge was rebuilt in stone and still exists today.

== Culture and community ==
The hill Pen y Foel is the basis for the name of the local male voice choir, Cor Meibion Y Foel, which is a member of the National Association of Choirs. It has 43 members and rehearses in the village at Capel Ifan. Over the past decade the choir has supported local eisteddfodau, competed in the Anglesey Eisteddfod, has raised money for numerous charities and has entertained audiences and congregations in concerts, weddings and other functions throughout North Wales.

Ysgol Gymuned Llanerch-y-medd is a primary school in the village, teaching children ages 5–11.

Llannerch-y-medd has its own association football club, Llanerchymedd F.C.

== Religious sites ==
The parish church of St. Mary exists in the village. The church building has a medieval tower, a church bell believed to be from the 18th century, and a font from the 14th century. The church, with the exception of the tower, was re-built in 1850. By 2003 the church had closed, however as of 2026 the church holds services twice a month.

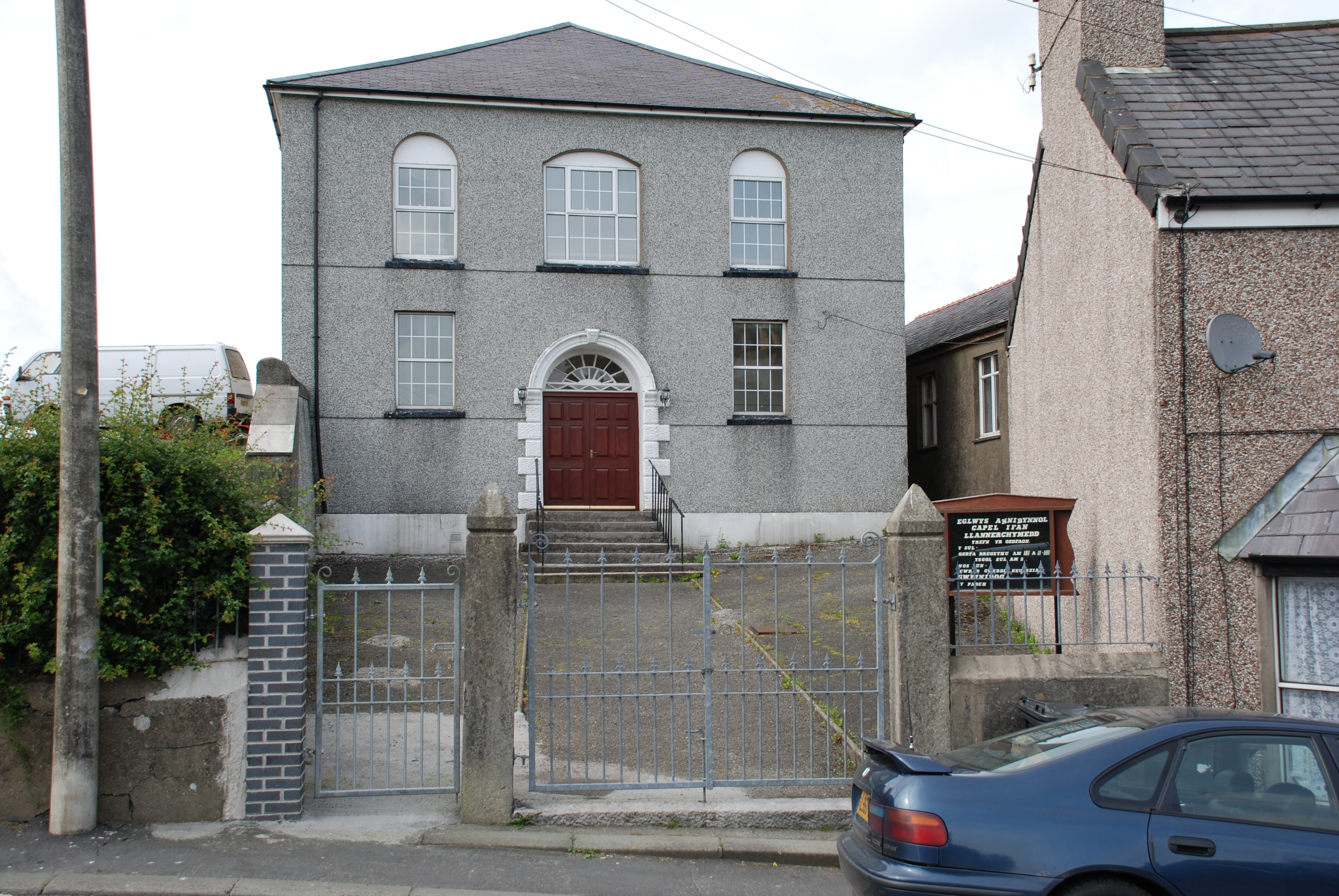
Capel Ifan, an independent chapel located slightly west of the square.

The Tabernacl Baptist Chapel is the other religious site in Llannerch-y-medd.

In the nearby surrounding hamlet of Gwredog, is St Mary's Church, Rhodogeidio.

== Notable people ==
- Hugh Hughes (1693–1776) a Welsh poet; lived on his estate at Llwydiarth Esgob, near Llanerchymedd.
