= Mechell =

Saint Mechell was the 6th century founder and first abbot of the clas (a type of early Welsh/Celtic monastery) of Llanfechell, on Anglesey in north-west Wales. St Mechell's day is celebrated on 15 November. It is claimed that he is buried in Llanfechell.

He was said to have been a Breton by birth. From the 14th century, he was identified with Saint Machudd, a Welshman and supposed Bishop of Caerwent who has been similarly confused with Saint Malo. Malo and Mechell both have 15 November as their feast day,

A 17th-century manuscript, (Llanstephan MS. 125) records a Welsh poem, "Cywydd i Fechell Sant". This describes St Mechell as the son of Echwys ab Gwyn Gohoew. It goes on to claim many miracles from his life including raising a giant from the dead and converting him to Christianity, turning thieves to stone, and blinding and then curing the leader. This last act produced a gift of land in gratitude, to be demarked by the route of a released hare. The hare, under divine guidance, marked the full extent of what is now the parish of Llanfechell, Anglesey, on which he then founded the monastery.
