= List of standardised Welsh place-names in Anglesey =

Location of Isle of Anglesey in Wales.

The list of standardised Welsh place-names, for places in Anglesey, is a list compiled by the Welsh Language Commissioner to recommend the standardisation of the spelling of Welsh place-names, particularly in the Welsh language and when multiple forms are used, although some place-names in English were also recommended to be matched with the Welsh. The list contains 140 entries, as of November 2023.

The list is based on recommendations provided by the Place-names Standardisation Panel, convened by the Commissioner, for expert advice on the standardisation of Welsh place-names. The panel bases their decisions on a set of guidelines (currently dating to June 2023), specific to Welsh settlement names (such as those of villages, towns, and cities) and topographic features (such as lakes, mountains and rivers). The panel does not cover house or building names, although similar principles could be applied to them or to names for new developments (for which the Commissioner offers their own advice to local authorities and housing developers). The panel may also have used additional guidelines.

The list was first published in 2018, and took years to put together. Upon creation, these lists were published under the Open Government Licence 3.0.

== List ==
Recommended standardised names		Other name/spelling not recommended	Type	Grid reference
Welsh	English	Other name/spelling not recommended	Type	Grid reference
Amlwch	Amlwch		Settlement	SH4493
Bachau	Bachau		Settlement	SH4383
Benllech	Benllech		Settlement	SH5182
Bethel	Bethel		Settlement	SH3970
Biwmares	Beaumaris		Settlement	SH6076
Bodedern	Bodedern		Settlement	SH3380
Bodewryd	Bodewryd		Settlement	SH3990
Bodffordd	Bodffordd		Settlement	SH4276
Bodorgan	Bodorgan		Area	SH3867
Bodwrog	Bodwrog		Settlement	SH4077
Bryn-du	Bryn-du	Bryn Du	Settlement	SH3472
Bryngwran	Bryngwran		Settlement	SH3577
Brynsiencyn	Brynsiencyn		Settlement	SH4867
Bryn-teg	Bryn-teg	Brynteg	Settlement	SH4982
Burwen	Burwen		Settlement	SH4193
Bwrdd Arthur	Bwrdd Arthur		Man-made feature	SH5881
Caergeiliog	Caergeiliog		Settlement	SH3078
Caergybi	Holyhead		Settlement	SH2482
Caim	Caim		Settlement	SH6280
Capel Coch	Capel Coch		Settlement	SH4582
Capel Gwyn	Capel Gwyn		Settlement	SH3475
Capel Mawr	Capel Mawr		Settlement	SH4171
Capel Parc	Capel Parc		Settlement	SH4486
Carmel	Carmel		Settlement	SH3882
Carreg-lefn	Carreg-lefn	Carreglefn	Settlement	SH3889
Ceint	Ceint		Settlement	SH4874
Cemaes	Cemaes		Settlement	SH3693
Cemlyn	Cemlyn		Settlement	SH3393
Cerrigceinwen	Cerrigceinwen		Settlement	SH4273
Coedana	Coedana		Settlement	SH4282
Dothan	Dothan		Settlement	SH3774
Dulas	Dulas		Settlement	SH4687
Dwyran	Dwyran		Settlement	SH4466
Elim	Elim		Settlement	SH3584
Engedi	Engedi		Settlement	SH3676
Y Fali	Valley		Settlement	SH2979
Gaerwen	Gaerwen		Settlement	SH4871
Glanrafon	Glanrafon	Glan-yr-afon	Settlement	SH6080
Glyn Garth	Glyn Garth		Area	
Gwalchmai	Gwalchmai		Settlement	SH3975
Gwalchmai Uchaf	Gwalchmai Uchaf		Settlement	SH3975
Gwredog	Gwredog		Settlement	SH4086
Heneglwys	Heneglwys		Settlement	SH4276
Hermon	Hermon		Settlement	SH3868
Kingsland	Kingsland		Settlement	SH2481
Llain-goch	Llain-goch	Llaingoch	Settlement	SH2382
Llanallgo	Llanallgo		Settlement	SH4985
Llanbabo	Llanbabo		Settlement	SH3786
Llanbadrig	Llanbadrig		Settlement	SH3894
Llanbedr-goch	Llanbedr-goch	Llanbedrgoch	Settlement	SH5180
Llanddaniel-fab	Llanddaniel-fab	Llanddaniel Fab	Settlement	SH4970
Llanddeusant	Llanddeusant		Settlement	SH3485
Llanddona	Llanddona		Settlement	SH5779
Llanddyfnan	Llanddyfnan		Settlement	SH5078
Llandegfan	Llandegfan		Settlement	SH5673
Llandrygarn	Llandrygarn		Settlement	SH3779
Llandyfrydog	Llandyfrydog		Settlement	SH4485
Llanedwen	Llanedwen		Settlement	SH5168
Llaneilian	Llaneilian		Settlement	SH4692
Llaneuddog	Llaneuddog		Settlement	SH4688
Llaneugrad	Llaneugrad		Settlement	SH4882
Llanfachraeth	Llanfachraeth		Settlement	SH3182
Llanfaelog	Llanfaelog		Settlement	SH3373
Llan-faes	Llan-faes	Llanfaes	Settlement	SH6077
Llanfaethlu	Llanfaethlu		Settlement	SH3186
Llanfair Mathafarn Eithaf	Llanfair Mathafarn Eithaf	Llanfair-Mathafarn-Eithaf	Settlement	SH5083
Llanfair Pwllgwyngyll	Llanfair Pwllgwyngyll	Llanfairpwllgwyngyll	Settlement	SH5371
Llanfair-y-Cwmwd	Llanfair-y-Cwmwd		Settlement	SH4466
Llanfair-yng-Nghornwy	Llanfair-yng-Nghornwy		Settlement	SH3290
Llanfair-yn-Neubwll	Llanfair-yn-Neubwll		Settlement	SH3076
Llanfechell	Llanfechell		Settlement	SH3691
Llanfigel	Llanfigel	Llanfugail	Settlement	SH3282
Llanfihangel Dinsylwy	Llanfihangel Dinsylwy	Llanfihangel Din Sylwy	Settlement	SH5881
Llanfihangel Tre'r-beirdd	Llanfihangel Tre'r-beirdd		Settlement	SH4583
Llanfihangel Ysgeifiog	Llanfihangel Ysgeifiog		Settlement	SH4873
Llanfwrog	Llanfwrog		Settlement	SH3084
Llangadwaladr	Llangadwaladr		Settlement	SH3869
Llangaffo	Llangaffo		Settlement	SH4468
Llangefni	Llangefni		Settlement	SH4675
Llangeinwen	Llangeinwen		Settlement	SH4365
Llangoed	Llangoed		Settlement	SH6079
Llangristiolus	Llangristiolus		Settlement	SH4373
Llangwyfan	Llangwyfan		Settlement	SH3471
Llangwyllog	Llangwyllog		Settlement	SH4379
Llanidan	Llanidan		Man-made feature	SH4966
Llaniestyn	Llaniestyn		Settlement	SH5879
Llanlleiana	Llanlleiana		Settlement	SH3894
Llannerch-y-medd	Llannerch-y-medd		Settlement	SH4184
Llanrhuddlad	Llanrhuddlad	Llanrhyddlad	Settlement	SH3389
Llansadwrn	Llansadwrn		Settlement	SH5576
Llantrisant	Llantrisant		Settlement	SH3683
Llanynghenedl	Llanynghenedl		Settlement	SH3181
Llechgynfarwy	Llechgynfarwy		Settlement	SH3881
Llechylched	Llechylched		Settlement	SH3476
Llynfaes	Llynfaes		Settlement	SH4078
Maenaddwyn	Maenaddwyn		Settlement	SH4584
Malltraeth	Malltraeth		Settlement	SH4068
Marian-glas	Marian-glas		Settlement	SH5084
Moelfre	Moelfre		Settlement	SH5186
Mynydd Mechell	Mynydd Mechell		Settlement	SH3589
Nebo	Nebo		Settlement	SH4690
Niwbwrch	Newborough		Settlement	SH4265
Paradwys	Paradwys		Settlement	SH4271
Pencarnisiog	Pencarnisiog		Settlement	SH3573
Pengorffwysfa	Pengorffwysfa		Settlement	SH4692
Penmon	Penmon		Settlement	SH6380
Penmynydd	Penmynydd		Settlement	SH5074
Penrhosfeilw	Penrhosfeilw		Settlement	SH2280
Penrhosllugwy	Penrhosllugwy	Penrhos Lligwy	Settlement	SH4786
Pen-sarn	Pen-sarn	Penysarn	Settlement	SH4590
Pentraeth	Pentraeth		Settlement	SH5278
Pentre Berw	Pentre Berw		Settlement	SH4772
Pentrefelin	Pentrefelin		Settlement	SH4392
Penygarnedd	Penygarnedd	Pen-y-garnedd	Settlement	SH5376
Pont-hwfa	Pont-hwfa	Pont-Hwfa	Settlement	SH2382
Pont-rhyd-y-bont	Four Mile Bridge		Settlement	SH2878
Porthaethwy	Menai Bridge		Settlement	SH5572
Porthllechog	Bull Bay		Settlement	SH4294
Porthyfelin	Porthyfelin	Porth-y-Felin	Settlement	SH2483
Rhodogeidio	Rhodogeidio		Settlement	SH4086
Rhosbeirio	Rhosbeirio		Settlement	SH3991
Rhoscefn-hir	Rhoscefn-hir	Rhos Cefn Hir	Settlement	SH5276
Rhoscolyn	Rhoscolyn		Settlement	SH2675
Rhos-goch	Rhos-goch	Rhosgoch	Settlement	SH4089
Rhos-meirch	Rhos-meirch	Rhosmeirch	Settlement	SH4677
Rhosneigr	Rhosneigr		Settlement	SH3173
Rhostrehwfa	Rhostrehwfa		Settlement	SH4474
Rhos-y-bol	Rhos-y-bol	Rhosybol	Settlement	SH4288
Rhyd-wyn	Rhyd-wyn	Rhydwyn	Settlement	SH3188
Soar	Soar		Settlement	SH3872
Star	Star		Settlement	SH5172
Talwrn	Talwrn		Settlement	SH4977
Traeth Coch	Red Wharf Bay		Topographical feature	SH5480
Trearddur	Trearddur		Settlement	SH2578
Trefdraeth	Trefdraeth		Settlement	SH4070
Trefor	Trefor		Settlement	SH3780
Tregaean	Tregaean	Tregaian	Settlement	SH4579
Tregele	Tregele		Settlement	SH3592
Tŷ-croes	Tŷ-croes	Tŷ Croes	Settlement	SH3472
Tyn-y-gongl	Tyn-y-gongl	Tyn-y-Gongl	Settlement	SH5182
