= List of places in Anglesey =

Map of places in Anglesey compiled from this list
See the list of places in Wales for places in other principal areas.

This is a list of towns and villages in the principal area of Anglesey, Wales.

== A ==
- Aberffraw
- Amlwch
- Amlwch Port

== B ==
- Beaumaris
- Benllech
- Bodafon
- Bodedern
- Bodewryd
- Bodffordd
- Bodorgan
- Bryn Du
- Bryngwran
- Brynrefail
- Brynteg
- Brynsiencyn
- Bull Bay
- Burwen

== C ==
- Caergeiliog
- Caim
- Capel Coch
- Capel Gwyn
- Capel Mawr
- Capel Parc
- Carmel
- Carreglefn
- Castellior
- Cemaes Bay
- Cemlyn
- Cerrigceinwen
- Cerrig Man
- Cestyll Garden
- Church Bay
- Coedana
- Cymyran

== D ==
- Dulas
- Dwyran

== E ==
- Elim
- Engedi

== F ==
- Four Mile Bridge

== G ==
- Gaerwen
- Glan-alaw
- Glan-yr-afon
- Gors
- Gorslwyd
- Gwalchmai
- Gwredog

== H ==
- Hendre
- Heneglwys
- Hermon
- Holyhead

== L ==
- Llaingoch
- Llanallgo
- Llanbabo
- Llanbadrig
- Llanbedrgoch
- Llanbeulan
- Llanddaniel
- Llanddeusant
- Llanddona
- Llanddwyn
- Llandegfan
- Llandrygarn
- Llandyfrydog
- Llandysilio
- Llanedwen
- Llaneilian
- Llaneugrad
- Llanerchymedd
- Llanfachraeth
- Llanfaelog
- Llanfaes
- Llanfaethlu
- Llanfair Mathafarn Eithaf
- Llanfairpwllgwyngyllgogerychwyrndrobwyllllantysiliogogogoch
- Llanfairyneubwll
- Llanfairynghornwy
- Llanfechell
- Llanffinan
- Llanfflewyn
- Llanfihangel Yn Nhywyn
- Llanfihangel Tre'r Beirdd
- Llanfihangel Ysgeifiog
- Llanfugail
- Llanfwrog
- Llangadwaladr
- Llangaffo
- Llangefni
- Llangeinwen
- Llangoed
- Llangristiolus
- Llangwyfan
- Llangwyllog
- Llanidan
- Llaniestyn
- Llanllibio
- Llanrhwydrys
- Llanrhyddlad
- Llansadwrn, Anglesey
- Llantrisant, Anglesey
- Llanwenllwyfo
- Llanynghenedl
- Llaniestyn
- Llanynghenedl
- Llechgynfarwy
- Llechylched
- Lleiniog
- Llynfaes

== M ==
- Maenaddwyn
- Malltraeth
- Marian Glas
- Mechell
- Mynydd Bodafon
- Mynydd Mechell
- Meinir
- Menai Bridge
- Mochdref
- Moelfre
- Mona

== N ==
- Nebo, Anglesey
- Newborough, Anglesey

== P ==
- Paradwys
- Parc
- Pencarnisiog
- Penygraigwen
- Pengorffwysfa
- Penmon, Anglesey
- Penmynydd
- Penrhos
- Penrhyd
- Pentraeth
- Pentre Berw
- Pen y Garnedd
- Penygraigwen
- Penysarn

== R ==
- Rhodogeidio
- Rhosbeirio
- Rhos Cefn Hir
- Rhoscolyn
- Rhosgoch
- Rhosmeirch
- Rhosneigr
- Rhostrehwfa
- Rhosybol
- Rhydwyn

== S ==
- Star, Anglesey
- Soar, Aberffraw

== T ==
- Talwrn
- Trearddur Bay
- Trefdraeth
- Trefor
- Tregaian
- Tregele
- Trewalchmai
- Tŷ Croes
- Tyn-y-Gongl

== V ==
- Valley

== W ==
- Wern y Wylan

== See also ==
- List of places in Anglesey (categorised)
- List of Anglesey towns by population
