= List of churches in Anglesey =

The following is a list of churches in Anglesey, Wales.

== Map of medieval parish churches ==
Some of these may have been chapels of ease.

Medieval parish churches in Anglesey

== Active churches ==
There is no online register of churches belonging to the Union of Welsh Independents, so the only source for UWI churches is the Coflein (historic buildings) register, at which point it becomes impossible to distinguish open from closed UWI churches.

The council area has an estimated 169 to 200 active churches for 69,700 inhabitants, a ratio of one church to every 349 to 412 inhabitants.

Name	Image	Community (settlement)	Dedication	Web	Founded	Denomination	Benefice	Notes
St Beuno, Aberffraw		Aberffraw	Beuno		Ancient	Church in Wales	Bro Cadwaladr	
Capel Uchaf, Aberffraw		Aberffraw			1860	Presbyterian		
Capel Dothan, Ty Croes		Aberffraw (Dothan)	Dothan		1829	Presbyterian		Rebuilt 1860, 1902
St Cwyfan, Llangwyfan		Aberffraw (Llangwyfan)	Kevin of Glendalough		Medieval	Church in Wales	Bro Cwyfan	
St Mary, Llangwyfan		Aberffraw (Llangwyfan)	Mary		1870	Church in Wales	Bro Cwyfan	
St Eleth, Amlwch		Amlwch	Elaeth		Ancient	Church in Wales	Bro Eleth	Rebuilt 1800
Our Lady Star of the Sea & St Winefride, Amlwch		Amlwch	Mary, Winefride		1932-1937	Roman Catholic	Amlwch, Benllech, Cemaes Bay	Closed 2004-2011
Amlwch English Methodist Church		Amlwch			1807	Methodist	Bangor & Holyhead Circuit	Rebuilt 1860
Capel Bethesda, Amlwch		Amlwch	Pool of Bethesda		1777	Presbyterian		Rebuilt 1818, 1871
Capel Peniel, Amlwch Port		Amlwch (Amlwch Port)	Penuel		1850	Presbyterian		Rebuilt 1900
Capel Rehoboth, Burwen		Amlwch (Burwen)	Rehoboth		1840	Presbyterian		Rebuilt 1897, 1935
SS Mary & Nicholas, Beaumaris		Beaumaris	Mary, Nicholas		Medieval	Church in Wales	Bro Seiriol	
Our Lady Queen of Martyrs, Beaumaris		Beaumaris	Mary		c. 1910	Roman Catholic	Beaumaris, Llangefni, Men Bridge	
Capel y Drindod, Beaumaris		Beaumaris	Trinity		1804	Presbyterian		Rebuilt 1873. Grade II listed
Oasis Church Anglesey		Beaumaris				Unknown		
St Catherine, Llanfaes		Beaumaris (Llanfaes)	Catherine of Alexandria		Medieval	Church in Wales	Bro Seiriol	Rebuilt 1811-1845
St Edern, Bodedern		Bodedern	Edern ap Nudd		Ancient	Church in Wales	Bro Cwyfan	
Capel Tabernacl, Bodedern		Bodedern	Tabernacle		1826	Baptist Union		Rebuilt 1857, 1884
Capel Saron, Bodedern		Bodedern	Sharon plain		1829	Independent		Rebuilt 1868, 1880, 1907. Coflein only; defunct?
Capel Gad Newydd, Bodffordd		Bodffordd			1842	Presbyterian		Rebuilt 1893
Capel Sardis, Bodffordd		Bodffordd	Sardis		1814	Independent		Rebuilt 1895. Coflein only; defunct?
St Twrog, Bodwrog		Bodffordd (Bodwrog)	Twrog		Ancient	Church in Wales	Bro Cyngar	Current building c. 1490
St Llwydian, Heneglwys		Bodffordd (Heneglwys)	Llwydian		Medieval	Church in Wales	Bro Cyngar	Rebuilt 1845
St Trygarn, Llandrygarn		Bodffordd (Llandrygarn)	Trygarn		Medieval	Church in Wales	Bro Cyngar	
Capel Seion, Llandrygarn		Bodffordd (Llandrygarn)	Zion		1792	Presbyterian		Current building 1817
Capel Belan (Gilead), Llynfaes		Bodffordd (Llynfaes)	Gilead		1833	Baptist Union		
Capel Bethel, Maes-y-Llan		Bodffordd (Maes-y-Llan)	Bethel		1840	Independent		Rebuilt 1879. Coflein only; defunct?
Capel Ebeneser, Trefor		Bodffordd (Trefor)	Eben-Ezer			Methodist Church		
Capel Beulah, Bodorgan		Bodorgan	Beulah		1827	Presbyterian		Rebuilt 1879
Capel Bethel, Bethel		Bodorgan (Bethel)	Bethel		1805	Presbyterian		Rebuilt 1866, 1905
St Cadwaladr, Llangadwaladr		Bodorgan (Llangadwaladr)	Cadwaladr		Medieval	Church in Wales	Bro Cadwaladr	
Christ the King, Malltraeth		Bodorgan (Malltraeth)	Jesus			Church in Wales	Bro Cadwaladr	
Capel Sardis, Malltraeth		Bodorgan (Malltraeth)	Sardis		1831	Presbyterian		Rebuilt 1860
St Beuno, Trefdraeth		Bodorgan (Trefdraeth)	Beuno		Ancient	Church in Wales	Bro Cadwaladr	Current building 13th century
Holy Trinity, Bryngwran		Bryngwran	Trinity		1841-1842	Church in Wales	Bro Cwyfan	Replaced nearby medieval churches, St Ulched's and Holy Rood
Capel Hebron, Bryngwran		Bryngwran	Hebron		1824	Presbyterian		Rebuilt 1880
Capel Salem, Bryngwran		Bryngwran	Jerusalem		1794	Independent		Current building 1839. Coflein only; defunct?
Capel Engedi, Ceirchiog		Bryngwran (Ceirchiog)	Ein Gedi		1888	Presbyterian		
St Tegfan, Llandegfan		Cwm Cadnant (Llandegfan)	Tegfan		Medieval	Church in Wales	Bro Tysilio	
Capel Barachia, Llandegfan		Cwm Cadnant (Llandegfan)	Berechiah		1820	Presbyterian		Rebuilt 1860, 1900
St Sadwrn, Llansadwrn		Cwm Cadnant (Llansadwrn)	Sadwrn		Medieval	Church in Wales	Bro Tysilio	Rebuilt 1881
Capel Seilo, Cefn-coch		Cylch y Garn (Cefn-coch)	Shiloh		1839	Independent		Coflein only; defunct?
Capel Siloam, Cemlyn		Cylch y Garn (Cemlyn)	Pool of Siloam		1828	Presbyterian		
St Mary, Llanfair-yng-Nghornwy		Cylch y Garn (Llanfairynghornwy)	Mary		Ancient	Church in Wales	Bro Padrig	Current building 11th century
St Rhwydrus, Llanrhwydrus		Cylch y Garn (Llanrhwydrys)	Rhwydrus		Medieval	Church in Wales	Bro Padrig	
St Rhyddlad, Llanrhyddlad		Cylch y Garn (Llanrhyddlad)	Rhyddlad		Ancient	Church in Wales	Bro Padrig	Rebuilt 1858
Capel Bethel Hen, Llanrhyddlad		Cylch y Garn (Llanrhyddlad)	Bethel		1772	Presbyterian		Rebuilt 1839, 1905
Capel Rhydwyn		Cylch y Garn (Rhydwyn)			1791	Baptist Union		Building 1800-1810, rebuilt 1814, 1842
St Cybi, Holyhead		Holyhead	Cybi		540	Church in Wales	Bro Cybi	Building C13th-16th. Eglwys y Bedd ruins in yard
St David, Holyhead		Holyhead (Morawelon)	David of Wales		1962	Church in Wales ?	Bro Cybi	Not on CiW website. Methodists also meet here
St Mary Help of Christians, Holyhead		Holyhead	Mary		1860	Roman Catholic	Holyhead & Rhosneigr	Rebuilt 1965
Capel Hebron, Holyhead		Holyhead	Hebron		1862	Baptist Union		Rebuilt 1878, 1902
New Park Street English Baptist Church		Holyhead			1861	Baptist Union GB		
Holyhead English Methodist Church		Holyhead				Methodist	Bangor & Holyhead Circuit	
Newry Street English Presbyterian Church		Holyhead			1891	Presbyterian		
Hyfrydle United Church, Holyhead		Holyhead			1808	Presbyterian		Rebuilt 1856, 1888
Capel Noddfa, Holyhead		Holyhead			early C20th	Independent		Coflein only; defunct?
Capel Tabernacl, Holyhead		Holyhead	Tabernacle		1823	?		Rebuilt 1913
Bethel English Baptist Church, Holyhead		Holyhead	Bethel		1810	Baptist Union GB		Rebuilt 1817, 1851, 1895
Elim Pentecostal Church, Holyhead		Holyhead			1935	Elim		Met in Brynhyfryd Chapel (built 1906) since 1971
Elim Pentecostal (Mt Pleasant Independent)		Holyhead			1883	?		May be defunct. Details unclear
Capel Tabor, Llaingoch		Holyhead (Llaingoch)	Mount Tabor		1848	Independent		Rebuilt 1904. Coflein only; defunct?
Capel Seilo, Llaingoch		Holyhead (Llaingoch)	Shiloh		1850	Independent		Rebuilt 1897. Coflein only; defunct?
St Padrig, Llanbadrig		Llanbadrig	Patrick		Ancient	Church in Wales	Bro Padrig	Current building 12th century
St Patrick, Cemaes		Llanbadrig (Cemaes)	Patrick		1865	Church in Wales	Bro Padrig	
St David, Cemaes Bay		Llanbadrig (Cemaes)	David of Wales			Roman Catholic	Amlwch, Benllech, Cemaes Bay	
Capel Bethlehem, Cemaes		Llanbadrig (Cemaes)	Bethlehem		1823	Baptist Union		Current building 1856
Capel Bethesda, Cemaes		Llanbadrig (Cemaes)	Pool of Bethesda		1816	Presbyterian		Rebuilt 1861
Capel Bethel, Cemaes		Llanbadrig (Cemaes)	Bethel		1827	Independent		Rebuilt 1910. Coflein only; defunct?
Capel Cana, Llanddaniel Fab		Llanddaniel Fab	Cana		1825	Independent		Rebuilt 1862. Coflein only; defunct?
St Edwen, Llanedwen		Llanddaniel Fab (Llanedwen)	Edwen		Ancient	Church in Wales	Bro Dwynwen	Rebuilt 1856
St Dona, Llanddona		Llanddona	Dona		Ancient	Church in Wales	Bro Seiriol	Rebuilt 1873
Capel Peniel, Llanddona		Llanddona	Penuel		1814	Presbyterian		Rebuilt 1850, 1888
St Michael, Llanfihangel Din Sylwy		Llanddona (Llanfihangel Dinsylwy)	Michael		Ancient	Church in Wales	Bro Seiriol	Rebuilt 1855
St Iestyn, Llaniestyn		Llanddona (Llaniestyn)	Iestyn		Ancient	Church in Wales	Bro Seiriol	Current building 12th century
Capel Ty Mawr, Capel Coch		Llanddyfnan (Capel Coch)			1785	Presbyterian		Rebuilt 1812, 1865, 1898
St Ffinan, Llanffinan		Llanddyfnan (Llanffinan)	Ffinan		Ancient	Church in Wales	Bro Cadwaladr	Current building 1841
St Cwyllog, Llangwyllog		Llanddyfnan (Llangwllog)	Cwyllog		Ancient	Church in Wales	Bro Cyngar	Current building 12th century
Capel Gosen, Llangwyllog		Llanddyfnan (Llangwllog)	Goshen		1833	Presbyterian		
St Michael, Llanfihangel-Tre'r-Beirdd		Llanddyfnan (Maenaddwyn)	Michael		Medieval	Church in Wales	Bro Eleth	Rebuilt 1811, 1888
Capel Hebron, Maenaddwyn		Llanddyfnan (Maenaddwyn)	Hebron		1829	Independent		Coflein only; defunct?
Capel Nyth Clyd, Talwrn		Llanddyfnan (Talwrn)			1803	Presbyterian		Rebuilt 1851, 1880
Capel Siloam, Talwrn		Llanddyfnan (Talwrn)	Pool of Siloam		1841	Independent		Rebuilt 1880. Coflein only; defunct?
St Caian, Tregaian		Llanddyfnan (Tregaian)	Caian		Ancient	Church in Wales	Bro Cyngar	Current building 14th century
St Eilian, Llaneilian		Llaneilian	Eilian		Ancient	Church in Wales	Bro Eleth	
St Gwenllwyfo, Llanwenllwyfo		Llaneilian (Dulas)	Gwenllwyfo		1856	Church in Wales	Bro Eleth	Replaced St Gwenllwyfo (old church) (ruins)
Capel Sardis, Llanwenllwyfo		Llaneilian (Dulas)	Sardis		1834	Baptist Union		Rebuilt 1905
Capel Carmel, Penysarn		Llaneilian (Penysarn)	Mount Carmel		1842	Baptist Union		Rebuilt 1860, 1900
Capel Seilo, Pengorffwysfa		Llaneilian (Pengorffwysfa)	Shiloh		1826	Presbyterian		Rebuilt 1835, closed 1999, services now in Sun School
St Eugrad, Llaneugrad		Llaneugrad	Eigrad		Medieval	Church in Wales	Bro Eleth	
St Machraeth, Llanfachraeth		Llanfachraeth	Machraeth		Medieval	Church in Wales	Bro Cwyfan	Rebuilt in modern times
Capel Pont-yr-Arw, Llanfachraeth		Llanfachraeth			1787	Baptist Union		Current building 1837
Capel Abarim, Llanfachraeth		Llanfachraeth	Abarim		1862	Presbyterian		
Capel Ty'n y Maen, Llanfigael		Llanfachraeth (Llanfigael)			1800	Presbyterian		Rebuilt 1868, 1904
St Maelog, Llanfaelog		Llanfaelog	Maelog		Medieval	Church in Wales	Bro Cwyfan	Rebuilt 1848
Capel Rehoboth, Llanfaelog		Llanfaelog	Rehoboth		1827	Independent		Coflein only; defunct?
Capel Maelog, Pencarnisiog		Llanfaelog (Pencarnisiog)			1823	Methodist		Rebuilt 1863, 1908
St Therese, Rhosneigr		Llanfaelog (Rhosneigr)	Thérèse of Lisieux			Roman Catholic	Holyhead & Rhosneigr	
Capel Paran, Rhosneigr		Llanfaelog (Rhosneigr)	Mount Paran		1828	Presbyterian		Rebuilt 1850
Capel Bethania, Rhosneigr		Llanfaelog (Rhosneigr)	Bethany		1918	Independent		Coflein only; defunct?
Rhosneigr Evangelical Church		Llanfaelog (Rhosneigr)			1970s	Unknown		Meets in Horeb Chapel (built 1903, transferred 1986)
Capel Bryn Du, Ty Croes		Llanfaelog (Ty Croes)			1795	Presbyterian		Rebuilt 1814, 1859, 1901
St Maethlu, Llanfaethlu		Llanfaethlu	Maethlu		Medieval	Church in Wales	Bro Padrig	
Capel Soar, Llanfaethlu		Llanfaethlu	Zoara		1821	Baptist Union		Rebuilt 1836, 1903
Capel Ebeneser, Llanfaethlu		Llanfaethlu	Eben-Ezer		1839	Presbyterian		Rebuilt 1878, 1908
Capel Seion, Llanfair Mathafarn Eithaf		Llanfair-Mathafarn-Eithaf	Zion		1782	Baptist Union		Building 1803, rebuilt 1813
St Mary, Llanfair Mathafarn Eithaf		Llanfair-Mathafarn-Eithaf	Mary		Medieval	Church in Wales	Bro Tysilio	
St Andrew, Benllech		Llanfair-Mathafarn-Eithaf (Benllech)	Andrew		1964	Church in Wales		
Our Lady of Lourdes, Benllech		Llanfair-Mathafarn-Eithaf (Benllech)	Mary			Roman Catholic	Amlwch, Benllech, Cemaes Bay	
Capel Benllech		Llanfair-Mathafarn-Eithaf (Benllech)			1900	Presbyterian		
Capel Libanus, Benllech		Llanfair-Mathafarn-Eithaf (Benllech)	Mount Lebanon		1900	Independent		Coflein only; defunct?
Capel Soar, Rhos-fawr		Llanfair-Mathafarn-Eithaf (Brynteg)	Zoara		1814	Independent		Rebuilt 1875. Coflein only; defunct?
St Peter, Llanbedrgoch		Llanfair-Mathafarn-Eithaf (Llanbedrgoch)	Peter		Medieval	Church in Wales	Bro Tysilio	
Capel Glasinfryn, Llanbedrgoch		Llanfair-Mathafarn-Eithaf (Llanbedrgoch)			1794	Presbyterian		Rebuilt 1853, 1892
St Mary, Llanfairpwllgwyngyll		Llanfair Pwllgwyngyll	Mary		Medieval	Church in Wales	Bro Dwynwen	Rebuilt 1853
Rhos-y-Gad United Church		Llanfair Pwllgwyngyll			1785	Presbyterian		Rebuilt 1836, 1873
Capel Ebeneser, Llanfairpwllgwyngyll		Llanfair Pwllgwyngyll	Eben-Ezer		1805	Independent		Rebuilt 1839. Coflein only; defunct?
Capel Seilo, Caergeiliog		Llanfair-yn-Neubwll (Caergeiliog)	Shiloh		1848	Baptist Union		Rebuilt 1866
Capel Caergeiliog		Llanfair-yn-Neubwll (Caergeiliog)			1780	Presbyterian		Rebuilt 1818, 1872
St Mihangel, Llanfihangel yn Nhowyn		Llanfair-yn-Neubwll (Llanfih. yn Nhowyn)	Michael		Ancient			Rebuilt 1862. No longer used by CiW; chapel RAF Valley
St Michael, Gaerwen		Llanfihangel Ysgeifiog (Gaerwen)	Michael		1847	Church in Wales	Bro Cadwaladr	
Capel Moreia, Gaerwen		Llanfihangel Ysgeifiog (Gaerwen)	Moriah			Baptist Union		
Capel Disgwylfa, Gaerwen		Llanfihangel Ysgeifiog (Gaerwen)				Presbyterian		
St Cyngar, Llangefni		Llangefni	Cyngar of Llangefni		Ancient	Church in Wales	Bro Cyngar	Rebuilt 1824
St Joseph, Llangefni		Llangefni	Joseph			Roman Catholic	Beaumaris, Llangefni, Men Bridge	
Capel Penuel, Llangefni		Llangefni	Penuel		1897	Baptist Union		
Capel Moreia, Llangefni		Llangefni	Moriah		1794	Presbyterian		Rebuilt 1896-1898
Capel Lon y Felin, Llangefni		Llangefni			1903	Presbyterian		
Cildwrn Evangelical Church		Llangefni			1791	Unknown		Meets in Cildwrn Chapel (1791; rebuilt 1878; redundant 1897)
Capel Smyrna, Llangefni		Llangefni	Smyrna		1844	Independent		Rebuilt 1870, 1903. Coflein only; defunct?
Capel Ebeneser, Rhosmeirch		Llangefni (Rhosmeirch)	Eben-Ezer		1749	Independent		Rebuilt 1800, 1869. Coflein only; defunct?
St Cawrdaf, Llangoed		Llangoed	Cawrdaf		Medieval	Church in Wales	Bro Seiriol	Rebuilt C17th, 1881
Capel Jerwsalem, Llangoed		Llangoed	Jerusalem		1802	Baptist Union		Rebuilt 1862
Capel Ty Rhys, Llangoed		Llangoed			1794	Presbyterian		Rebuilt 1822, 1908
St Seiriol, Penmon		Llangoed (Penmon)	Seiriol		Ancient	Church in Wales	Bro Seiriol	
St Cristiolus, Llangristiolus		Llangristiolus	Cristiolus		Ancient	Church in Wales	Bro Cadwaladr	
Capel Horeb, Llangristiolus		Llangristiolus	Mount Horeb		1764	Presbyterian		Rebuilt 1777, 1810, 1893, 1901. Earliest CM chapel Anglesey
Capel Pisga, Rhostrehwfa		Llangristiolus (Rhostrehwfa)	Pisgah		1875	Baptist Union		
Capel Cana, Rhostrehwfa		Llangristiolus (Rhostrehwfa)	Cana		1827	Presbyterian		Rebuilt 1891
St Nidan, Llanidan		Llanidan	Nidan		1839	Church in Wales	Bro Dwynwen	Replaced St Nidan, Llanidan (old church) (medieval)
Capel Horeb, Brynsiencyn		Llanidan (Brynsiencyn)	Mount Horeb		1785	Presbyterian		Current building 1883
St Mary, Llannerch-y-medd		Llannerch-y-medd	Mary		Medieval	Church in Wales	Bro Eleth	
Capel Tabernacl, Llannerch-y-medd		Llannerch-y-medd	Tabernacle		1810s	Baptist Union		
Capel y Parc, Llannerch-y-medd		Llannerch-y-medd				Presbyterian		
Capel Carmel, Llechynfarwydd		Llannerch-y-medd	Mount Carmel		1826	Presbyterian		Rebuilt 1855
Capel Peniel, Llannerch-y-medd		Llannerch-y-medd			1811	Independent		Coflein only; defunct?
Capel Ifan, Llannerch-y-medd		Llannerch-y-medd	John ?		1811	Independent		Rebuilt 1831, 1861. Coflein only; defunct?
St Ana, Coedana		Llannerch-y-medd (Coedana)	Anne		Medieval	Church in Wales	Bro Eleth	Rebuilt 1894
St Mary, Bodewryd		Mechell (Bodewryd)	Mary		Medieval	Church in Wales	Bro Padrig	
Capel Bethlehem, Carreglefn		Mechell (Carreglefn)	Bethlehem		1806	Presbyterian		Rebuilt 1856, 1889
Capel Seion, Carreglefn		Mechell (Carreglefn)	Zion		1838	Independent		Rebuilt 1891. Coflein only; defunct?
St Mechell, Llanfechell		Mechell (Llanfechell)	Mechell		Medieval	Church in Wales	Bro Padrig	
Capel Libanus, Llanfechell		Mechell (Llanfechell)	Mount Lebanon		1832	Presbyterian		Rebuilt 1850, 1903
Capel Ebeneser, Llanfechell		Mechell (Llanfechell)	Eben-Ezer		1805	Independent		Rebuilt 1862. Coflein only; defunct?
St Fflewin, Llanfflewin		Mechell (Llanfflewin)	Flewyn		Medieval	Church in Wales	Bro Padrig	
Capel Calfaria, Mynydd Mechell		Mechell (Mynydd Mechell)	Calvary		1815	Baptist Union		
Capel Jerwsalem, Mynydd Mechell		Mechell (Mynydd Mechell)	Jerusalem		1817	Presbyterian		Rebuilt 1865
St Mary, Menai Bridge		Menai Bridge	Mary		1858	Church in Wales	Bro Tysilio	
St Tysilio, Menai Bridge		Menai Bridge	Tysilio		Medieval	Church in Wales	Bro Tysilio	
St Anne, Menai Bridge		Menai Bridge	Anne		1951	Roman Catholic	Beaumaris, Llangefni, Men Bridge	
Capel Moreia, Menai Bridge		Menai Bridge	Moriah		1884	Baptist Union		Demolished January 2022 as unsafe.
Menai Bridge English Presbyterian Church		Menai Bridge			1888	Presbyterian		
Capel Tabernacl, Menai Bridge		Menai Bridge	Tabernacle		1867	Independent		Coflein only; defunct?
Capel Beersheba (Capel Mawr), Menai Br.		Menai Bridge	Beersheba		1838	Presbyterian		Rebuilt 1856
Capel Brynrefail Chapel		Moelfre (Brynrefail)			1852	Presbyterian		
St Gallgo, Llanallgo		Moelfre (Llanallgo)	Gallgo		Medieval	Church in Wales	Bro Eleth	
Capel Paradwys, Llanallgo		Moelfre (Llanallgo)			1800	Presbyterian		Rebuilt 1856, 1898
Capel Carmel, Llanallgo		Moelfre (Llanallgo)	Mount Carmel			Independent		Coflein only; defunct?
St Michael, Penrhoslligwy		Moelfre (Penrhoslligwy)	Michael		Medieval	Church in Wales	Bro Eleth	
Capel Pencarneddi		Penmynydd			1803	Baptist Union		Rebuilt 1870, 1929
Capel Horeb, Penmynydd		Penmynydd	Mount Horeb		1827	Independent		Coflein only; defunct?
St Mary, Pentraeth		Pentraeth	Mary		Medieval	Church in Wales	Bro Tysilio	
Capel Moreia, Pentraeth		Pentraeth	Moriah		1902	Baptist Union		
Capel Ebeneser, Pentraeth		Pentraeth	Eben-Ezer		1803	Independent		Rebuilt 1856, 1903. Coflein only; defunct?
Capel Elim, Penygarnedd		Pentraeth (Penygarnedd)	Elim		1793	Presbyterian		Rebuilt 1824, 1876
St Gwenfaen, Rhoscolyn		Rhoscolyn	Gwenfaen		Ancient	Church in Wales	Bro Cybi	Rebuilt 1875-1879
Capel Bethania, Rhosybol		Rhosybol	Bethany		1883	Independent		Coflein only; defunct?
Capel Horeb, Gorslwyd		Rhosybol (Gorslwyd)	Mount Horeb		1791	Presbyterian		Rebuilt 1827, 1865
St Tyfrydog, Llandyfrydog		Rhosybol (Llandyfrydog)	St Tyfrydog		Medieval	Church in Wales	Bro Eleth	
Pengarnedd Chapel, Rhosgoch		Rhosybol (Rhosgoch)				Presbyterian		
Capel Dwyran		Rhosyr (Dwyran)			1813	Presbyterian		Rebuilt 1841, 1869
Capel Ysgoldy Tema, Groeslon		Rhosyr (Groeslon)			1815	Independent		Coflein only; defunct?
St Mary, Llanfair-yn-y-Cwmwd		Rhosyr (Llanfair-yn-y-Cwmwd)	Mary		Medieval	Church in Wales	Bro Dwynwen	
St Caffo, Llangaffo		Rhosyr (Llangaffo)	Caffo		Medieval	Church in Wales	Bro Cadwaladr	Rebuilt 1846
Capel Bethania, Llangaffo		Rhosyr (Llangaffo)	Bethany		1832	Presbyterian		Rebuilt 1851, 1901
St Ceinwen, Llangeinwen		Rhosyr (Llangeinwen)	Keyne		Medieval	Church in Wales	Bro Dwynwen	
St Peter, Newborough		Rhosyr (Newborough)	Peter		Medieval	Church in Wales	Bro Dwynwen	Longest church on Anglesey
St Thomas, Newborough		Rhosyr (Newborough)	Thomas			Church in Wales	Bro Dwynwen	
Capel Ebeneser, Newborough		Rhosyr (Newborough)	Eben-Ezer		1785	Presbyterian		Rebuilt 1861, 1881
St Ffraid, Trearddur Bay		Trearddur	Brigid of Kildare		Ancient	Church in Wales	Bro Cybi	Current building 1931-1932
Noddfa United Church, Trearddur Bay		Trearddur			1909	Baptist / PCW		
St Pabo, Llanbabo		Tref Alaw (Llanbabo)	Pabo Post Prydain		Medieval	Church in Wales	Bro Cwyfan	
Capel Bethania, Llanddeusant		Tref Alaw (Llanddeusant)	Bethany		1795	Independent		Rebuilt 1844. Coflein only; defunct?
SS Afran, Ieuan & Sannan, Llantrisant		Tref Alaw (Llantrisant)	Afan, Ieuan, Sannan		1899	Church in Wales	Bro Cwyfan	
Capel Ainon, Llantrisant		Tref Alaw (Llantrisant)	Aenon			Baptist Union		
St Morhaiarn, Gwalchmai		Trewalchmai (Gwalchmai)	Morhaiarn		Medieval	Church in Wales	Bro Cyngar	
Capel Jerwsalem, Gwalchmai		Trewalchmai (Gwalchmai)	Jerusalem		1789	Presbyterian		Rebuilt 1810, 1849, 1925
Capel Moreia, Gwalchmai		Trewalchmai (Gwalchmai)	Moriah		1844	Independent		Rebuilt 1902. Coflein only; defunct?
St Michael, Valley		Valley	Michael		1887	Church in Wales	Bro Cwyfan	
Capel Tabor, Valley		Valley	Mount Tabor		1824	Presbyterian		Current building 1864, rebuilt 1884

== Defunct churches ==
Name	Community (settlement)	Dedication	Web	Founded	Redundant	Denomination	Notes
St Mary, Tal-y-llyn	Aberffraw	Mary		Medieval	1992	Church in Wales	Chapel to ease to Llanbeulan. Friends of Friendless Churches 1999
Capel Seion, Aberffraw	Aberffraw	Zion		1806		Methodist	Rebuilt 1851, 1887. Presumably defunct
Capel Soar, Soar	Aberffraw (Soar)	Zoara		1824		Presbyterian	Rebuilt 1849. Presumably defunct
Capel Carmel, Amlwch Port	Amlwch (Amlwch Port)	Mount Carmel		1789	pre-2003	Independent	Current building 1826
Capel Soar, Bodedern	Bodedern	Zoara		1822		Methodist	Rebuilt 1880. Presumably defunct
Capel Gilgal, Bodedern	Bodedern	Gilgal		1807		Presbyterian	Rebuilt 1836. Presumably defunct
St Llibio, Llanllibio	Bodedern (Llanllibio)				C17th	Church in Wales	Nothing remains
Capel Ainon, Pen-llyn	Bodedern (Pen-Llyn)	Aenon		1839		Baptist	Rebuilt 1881. Presumably defunct
Capel Garizim, Bryntwrog	Bodffordd (Bryntwrog)	Mount Gerizim		1861		Presbyterian	Rebuilt 1905. Presumably defunct
St Peulan, Llanbeulan	Bryngwran (Llanbeulan)	Peulan		Ancient		Church in Wales	Friends of Friendless Churches 2004
Capel Salem, Llanfairynghornwy	Cylch y Garn (Llanfairynghornwy)	Jerusalem		1840		Presbyterian	Rebuilt 1901. Presumably defunct
St Seiriol, Holyhead	Holyhead	Seiriol		1853-1854	1980s	Church in Wales	Demolished 1992
Capel Moreia, Bryn Llewelyn	Llanbadrig (Bryn Llewelyn)	Moriah		1826		Presbyterian	Presumably defunct
St Deiniol, Llanddaniel Fab	Llanddaniel Fab	Deiniol		Ancient		Church in Wales	
Capel Preswylfa, Llanddaniel Fab	Llanddaniel Fab			1909		Presbyterian	Presumably defunct
St Dyfnan, Llanddyfnan	Llanddyfnan	Dyfnan		Medieval		Church in Wales	Building C14th. Not on CiW site so assumed defunct but status unclear
Capel Bethesda, Bodafon	Llanddyfnan (Mynydd Bodafon)	Pool of Bethesda		1897		Baptist	Presumably defunct
St Andrew's Mission Church	Llanddyfnan (Rhuddlan Fawr)	Andrew		mid-late C19th		Church in Wales	Not on CiW site so assumed defunct but status unclear
St Deiniol, Talwrn	Llanddyfnan (Talwrn)	Deiniol		1891	2013	Church in Wales	Sold for housing 2013
Capel Bosrah, Penysarn	Llaneilian (Penysarn)	Bozrah		1864		Presbyterian	Presumably defunct
St Figael, Llanfigael	Llanfachraeth (Llanfigael)	Figael		Medieval		Church in Wales	Friends of Friendless Churches 2007
Rhosneigr Methodist Chapel	Llanfaelog (Rhosneigr)			1904		Methodist	Presumably defunct
St Mwrog, Llanfwrog	Llanfaethlu (Llanfwrog)	Mwrog				Church in Wales	
Capel Tabernacl, Llanfair Mathafarn Eithaf	Llanfair Mathafarn Eithaf	Tabernacle		1820		Meth. or PCW	Rebuilt 1878. Presumably defunct
St Mary, Llanfair-yn-Neubwll	Llanfair-yn-neubwll	Mary		Medieval	1970s	Church in Wales	
St David, Caergeiliog	Llanfair-yn-Neubwll (Caergeiliog)	David of Wales		1912	pre-2013	Church in Wales	
St Michael, Llanfihangel Ysgeifiog	Llanfihangel Ysgeifiog	Michael		Medieval	1847	Church in Wales	
Ebenezer Methodist Chapel	Llangefni	Eben-Ezer		1803		Meth. or PCW	Rebuilt 1865. Presumably defunct
St Ceinwen, Cerrigceinwen	Llangristiolus (Cerrigceinwen)	Keyne		Ancient		Church in Wales	Rebuilt 1860/1869
St Ceidio, Rhodogeidio	Llannerch-y-medd (Rhodogeidio)	Ceidio		Ancient		Church in Wales	Occasional services
St Mary, Rhodogeidio	Llannerch-y-medd (Rhodogeidio)	Mary		Medieval	C19th	Church in Wales	Chapel of ease to St Ceidio, Rhodogeidio
St Peirio, Rhosbeirio	Mechell (Rhosbeirio)	Peirio		Ancient	C20th	Church in Wales	
Capel Lligwy	Moelfre			Medieval	C18th	Church in Wales	Now in ruins
St Gredifael, Penmynydd	Penmynydd	Gredifael		Ancient	post-2010	Church in Wales	Current building 12th century.
Capel Gilead, Penmynydd	Penmynydd	Gilead		1833		Presbyterian	Rebuilt 1856, 1866. Presumably defunct
Bont Methodist Chapel	Rhoscolyn (Pontrhydybont)			1806		Methodist	Rebuilt 1874. Closed in 1998
Capel Ty'n Rhos, Rhoscolyn	Rhoscolyn			1906	2010	Presbyterian	
Capel Sardis, Pontrhydybont	Rhoscolyn (Pontrhydybont)			1828		Baptist	Rebuilt 1839, 1861. Presumably defunct
Christ Church, Rhosybol	Rhosybol	Jesus		1875		Church in Wales	
Capel Bethel, Rhosybol	Rhosybol	Bethel		1826		Methodist	Presumably defunct
Capel-y-Parc, Capel Parc	Rhosybol (Capel Parc)			1820		Presbyterian	Rebuilt 1860. Presumably defunct
St Dwynwen, Llanddwyn	Rhosyr (Ynys Llanddwyn)	St Dwynwen				Church in Wales	Ruins only
Capel Towyn, Trearddur	Trearddur					Presbyterian	Presumably defunct
Capel Ebenezer, Kingsland Road, Holyhead	Trearddur	Eben-Ezer		1850		Presbyterian	Presumably defunct
SS Marcellus & Marcellinus, Llanddeusant	Tref Alaw (Llanddeusant)	Marcellus & Marcellina		Medieval		Church in Wales	Rebuilt 1868. Not on CiW site; presumably defunct
Capel Horeb, Treffynnon	Tref Alaw (Llanddeusant)	Mount Horeb		1822		Baptist	Rebuilt 1891. Presumably defunct
Capel Elim, Treffynnon	Tref Alaw (Llanddeusant)	Elim		1822		Presbyterian	Rebuilt 1863. Presumably defunct
SS Afran, Ieuan & Sannan (old), Llantrisant	Tref Alaw (Llantrisant)	Afan, Ieuan, Sannan		Medieval	1899	Church in Wales	
St Cynfarwy, Llechgynfarwy	Tref Alaw (Llechgynfarwy)	Cynfarwy		Ancient	post-2010	Church in Wales	Not on CiW site; presumably defunct. Rebuilt 1867
Capel Ebeneser, Trefor	Tref Alaw (Trefor)	Eben-Ezer		1804		Methodist	Rebuilt 1833. Presumably defunct
Capel Hermon, Valley	Valley	Mount Hermon		1870		Baptist	Presumably defunct
St Enghenedl, Llanynghenedl	Valley (Llanynghenedl)	Enghenedl		Ancient	1988	Church in Wales	Rebuilt 1862. Now forms extension to St Mihangel, Llanfihangel yn Nhowyn
