= List of settlements in Anglesey by population =

This is a guide to the size of settlements in Anglesey based on 2021 census data. The entire population of Anglesey is 68,878.

Map of the Communities of the Isle of Anglesey, Wales. Dot sizes indicate their relative populations. To see the recorded population value hover over a dot. nb. Map data is extracted from wikidata entries and show's Community Area populations, rather than town/village populations used in the table.
Total Isle of Anglesey population (wikidata:Q42617191) = 69,961 (2018)

[Hide/Show list of communities and their population]
1 Aberffraw (population 610 in 2011)
wikidata:Q24674797
2 Amlwch Community (population 3,789 in 2011)
wikidata:Q24717063
3 Beaumaris (population 1,938 in 2011)
wikidata:Q24810102
4 Bodedern (population 1,051 in 2011)
wikidata:Q3399236
5 Bodffordd (population 960 in 2011)
wikidata:Q3402654
6 Bodorgan (population 921 in 2011)
wikidata:Q3400978
7 Bryngwran (population 900 in 2021)
wikidata:Q3401558
8 Cwm Cadnant (population 2,121 in 2021)
wikidata:Q5197183
9 Cylch-y-Garn (population 758 in 2011)
wikidata:Q15212253
10 Holyhead (population 12,103 in 2021)
wikidata:Q24674792
11 Llanbadrig (population 1,177 in 2021)
wikidata:Q3402694
12 Llanddaniel Fab (population 840 in 2021)
wikidata:Q3404314
13 Llanddona (population 640 in 2021)
wikidata:Q3402690
14 Llanddyfnan (population 1,065 in 2021)
wikidata:Q15242552
15 Llaneilian (population 1,262 in 2021)
wikidata:Q6661279
16 Llaneugrad (population 254 in 2011)
wikidata:Q13129620
17 Llanfachraeth (population 573 in 2021)
wikidata:Q3402312
18 Llanfaelog (population 1,500 in 2021)
wikidata:Q6661329
19 Llanfaethlu (population 551 in 2021)
wikidata:Q2910205
20 Llanfair-Mathafarn-Eithaf (population 3,085 in 2021)
wikidata:Q13129624
21 Llanfair-yn-Neubwll (population 1,733 in 2021)
wikidata:Q3401074
22 Llanfairpwllgwyngyll (population 2,906 in 2021)
wikidata:Q24664355
23 Llanfihangel Ysgeifiog (population 1,711 in 2021)
wikidata:Q10987925
24 Llangefni (population 5,500 in 2021)
wikidata:Q24664354
25 Llangoed (population 1,229 in 2011)
wikidata:Q3404757
26 Llangristiolus (population 1,403 in 2021)
wikidata:Q3400997
27 Llanidan (population 1,020 in 2021)
wikidata:Q3402736
28 Llannerch-y-medd (population 1,380 in 2021)
wikidata:Q3401012
29 Mechell, Anglesey (population 1,293 in 2011)
wikidata:Q19609495
30 Menai Bridge (population 3,046 in 2021)
wikidata:Q2655856
31 Moelfre, Anglesey (population 916 in 2021)
wikidata:Q3397276
32 Penmynydd (population 455 in 2021)
wikidata:Q13130688
33 Pentraeth (population 1,222 in 2021)
wikidata:Q2278993
34 Rhoscolyn (population 485 in 2021)
wikidata:Q3401042
35 Rhosybol (population 1,078 in 2011)
wikidata:Q15272454
36 Rhosyr (population 2,235 in 2021)
wikidata:Q20571949
37 Trearddur (population 1,511 in 2021)
wikidata:Q628633
38 Tref Alaw (population 581 in 2011)
wikidata:Q7837752
39 Trewalchmai (population 971 in 2021)
wikidata:Q24664351
40 Valley, Anglesey (population 2,325 in 2021)
wikidata:Q3400948

| Rank | Settlement | Population (2021) |
|---|---|---|
| 1 | Holyhead | 11,760 |
| 2 | Llangefni | 5,261 |
| 3 | Amlwch | 3,147 |
| 4 | Menai Bridge | 3,046 |
| 5 | Llanfairpwllgwyngyll | 2,907 |
| 6 | Benllech | 2,072 |
| 7 | Valley | 2,005 |
| 8 | Gaerwen | 1,279 |
