= Llanddeusant =

Llanddeusant may refer to:

- Llanddeusant, Anglesey, North Wales
- Llanddeusant, Carmarthenshire, West Wales
