= St Mary's Church, Llanfair-yn-Neubwll =

Former church in Anglesey, Wales

Coordinates: 53.2698°N 4.5540°W

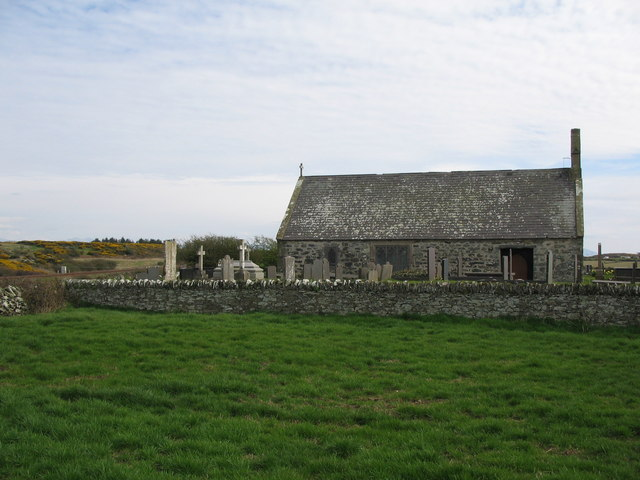
- St Mary's Church, Llanfair-yn-Neubwll
- Previous denomination: Church in Wales; Church of England; Roman Catholic

History
- Status: closed

Architecture
- Heritage designation: Grade II
- Designated: 1971
- Closed: 1970s

St Mary's Church was a Church in Wales parish church in Llanfair-yn-Neubwll, Anglesey, Wales. The current building was constructed in the 14th century, possibly on the site of a 12th-century church. It was restored in 1857. The church was deconsecrated in the 1970s and is a Grade II-listed building.

== History ==
The current church building was constructed in the 14th century, though there is a suggestion that there was originally a church from the 12th century on the site as the baptismal font dated from that time. It was constructed out of local stone rubble and sandstone as a small medieval church where the nave and chancel were not separated from each other.

In 1857 Henry Kennedy, who worked on a number of churches within the Church of England's Diocese of Bangor, started a renovation of the church. He installed windows in the north and south walls and reroofed the nave. He also removed the pews and replaced them with open seating. Despite the extent of this work, Kennedy used recycled materials from the original church and the renovations were comparatively minor compared to others going on in Anglesey at the time.

== Listing and closure ==
In the 1970s, St Mary's Church was granted Grade II-listed status, as "a good example of a simple, medieval church altered in the C19 but retaining much original fabric." The listing also stated that the church was "an important survival" in its original condition after numerous other churches had either been rebuilt or substantially refitted. Despite this, it was closed as an active church in the 1970s with the font being taken to St Cybi's Church in Holyhead for protection.
