= Llanfair-y-Cwmwd =

Coordinates: 53.1752°N 4.3250°W

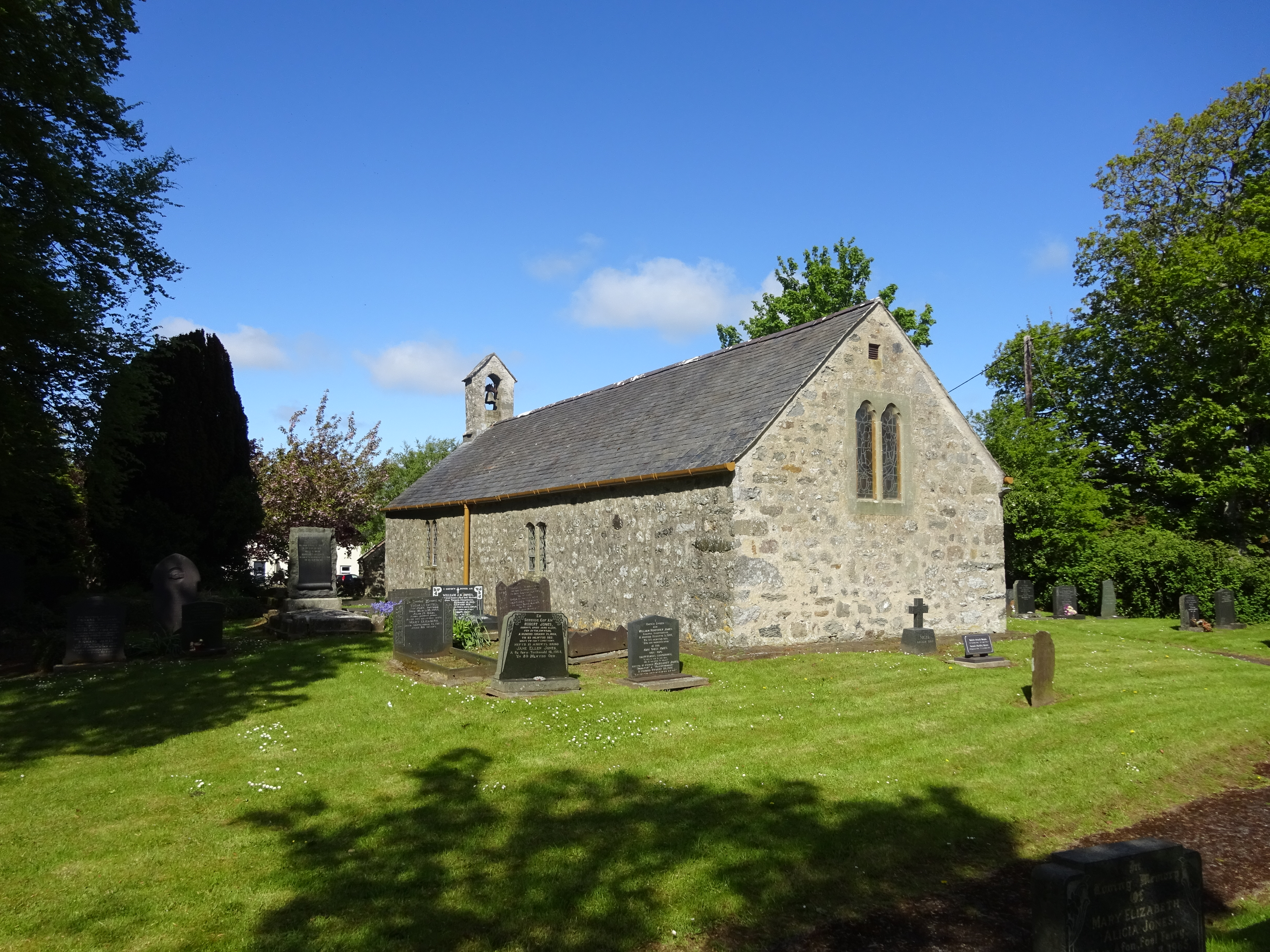
- Church of St Mary at Llanfair-y-Cwmwd

- Location within Anglesey
- OS grid reference: SH 4470 6676
  - Cardiff: 126.5 mi (203.6 km)
  - London: 211.4 mi (340.2 km)
- Community: Rhosyr
- Principal area: Anglesey
- Country: Wales
- Sovereign state: United Kingdom
- Post town: Llanfair Pwllgwyngyll
- Police: North Wales
- Fire: North Wales
- Ambulance: Welsh
- UK Parliament: Ynys Môn
- Senedd Cymru – Welsh Parliament: Bangor Conwy Môn

Llanfair-y-Cwmwd (or Llanfair-yn-y-Cwmwd) is a village and former parish in the community of Rhosyr, Anglesey, Wales. The church is dedicated to St Mary.

== See also ==
- List of localities in Wales by population
