= Melin Llynon, Llanddeusant =

Windmill on Anglesey, Wales

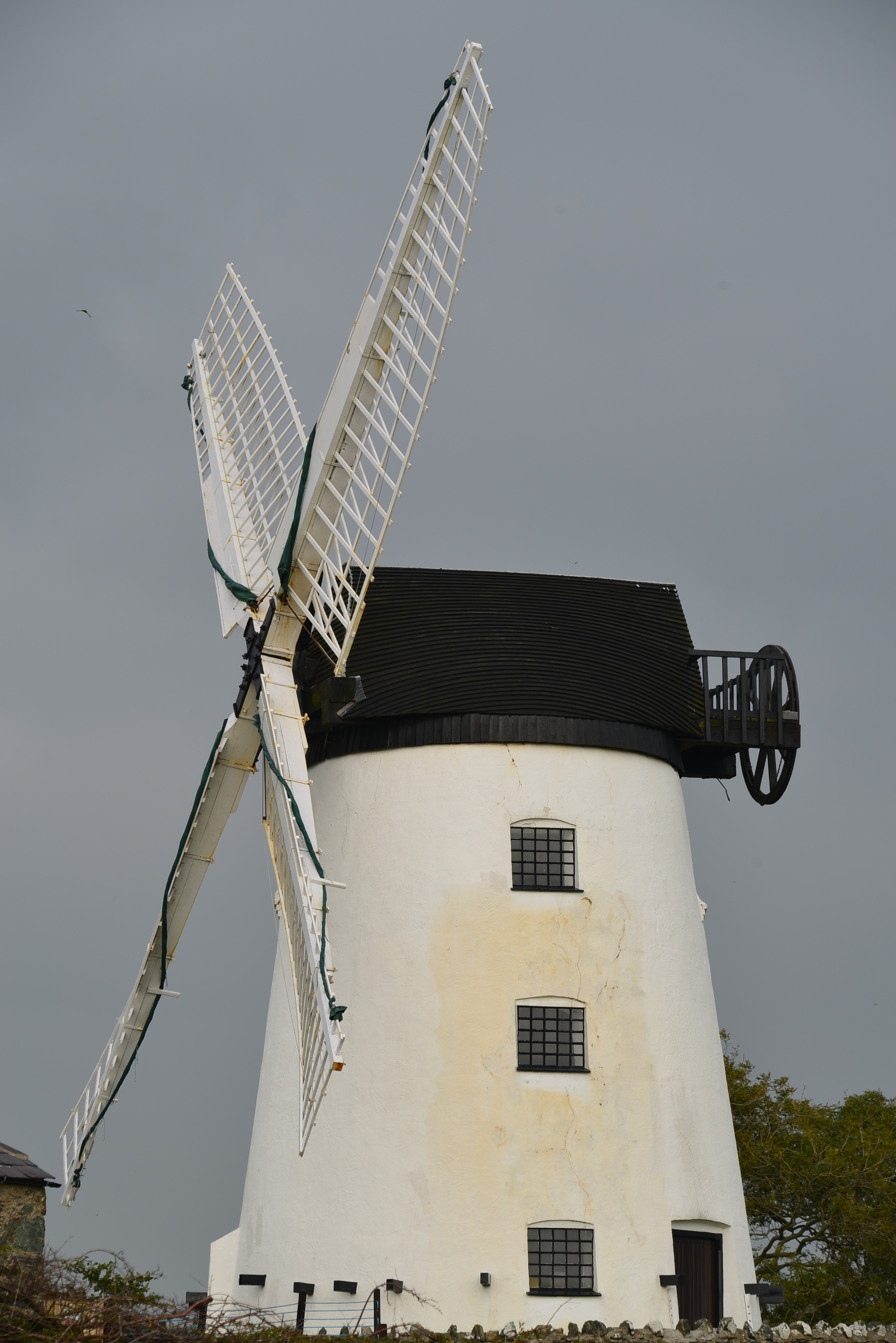
- Melin Llynon, September 2014
- Interactive map of Melin Llynon, Llanddeusant

Origin
- Mill name: Llynon Mill (Welsh: Melin Llynon)
- Mill location: Llanddeusant
- Grid reference: SH 3405 8523
- Coordinates: 53.3379°N 4.4939°W
- Operator: Richard Holt
- Year built: 1775

Information
- Purpose: Corn mill
- Type: Tower
- Storeys: Three
- No. of sails: Four
- Type of sails: Common
- Winding: Wheel and chain
- Other information: Only working windmill in Wales

Melin Llynon, or Llynon Mill, is a gristmill located on the outskirts of the village of Llanddeusant on the island of Anglesey. It is the only surviving working windmill in Wales.

== Founding ==
The mill was built on land owned by the surgeon Herbert Jones for £529, 11s in 1775–1776 (equivalent to £100,000 in 2025). It is classified as a tower mill. The machinery is within a stone tower and the moving top, or cap cwch, turns so that the sails hwyliau catch the wind from any direction. The tower was 9.3 metres tall and with four floors. It was used to drive machines for grinding corn, oats and barley. The first miller, Thomas Jones (1756–1846), worked it until his death. The position of miller was passed down through the generations, eventually going to a cousin William Pritchard. By 1929, the mill was registered as disused and in use again. By 1954, structural damage meant the mill was permanently out of order.

It is now the only working windmill in Anglesey and Wales. Also within the site is a reconstruction of an Iron Age roundhouse hut building.

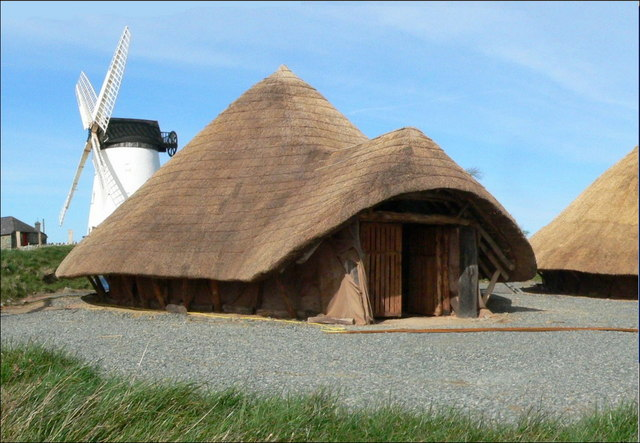
Llynnon mill Iron Age roundhouse reconstruction

== Damage ==
A storm in 1918 damaged the cap stopping it from turning to face the wind. It still operated intermittently for the next six years when the wind was from the southwest. Eventually the mill closed and became increasingly dilapidated.

== Reconstruction and ownership ==
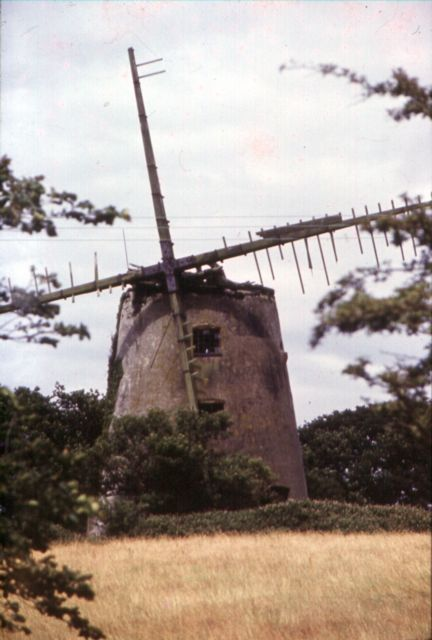
Melin Llynnon in 1976, before its restoration

The windmill was previously reconstructed by the Isle of Anglesey County Council after they purchased the mill in 1978. It was restored and reopened on 11 May 1984, and since 1986 the windmill produces stoneground flour.

Llynnon Mill was operational up until 2016. Since 2019 it has been owned by Richard Holt and his family, who purchased the mill with a 25-year lease. The mill was in disrepair, but with funding from several sources, including £100,000 from the UK Shared Prosperity Fund, the repairs were completed between 2022 and 2023 as part of the North Anglesey Regeneration programme. After the restoration, the previous miller, Lloyd Jones, was rehired in 2024 upon its completion.

Prior to the business venture, Richard, a native of Anglesey, was a pastry chef in London, England. His partner, sister, and father all work at the mill as part of the family business. Also at the site is a chocolate factory and donut (Mônuts) shop. Llynon Mill also teamed with the Llanfairpwll distillery to create a gin alcoholic beverage. And there is a model saffari on site. And also a reconstruction of an Iron Age era roundhouse which was constructed in 2007, and officially opened to the public by then Charles, Prince of Wales.

In 2026, Holt repainted the mill green at the bottom, red in the middle and white at the top, to match the Urdd Eisteddfod's mascot Mistar Urdd. Anglesey Council ordered him to restore the mill to its traditional white colour. Holt had not applied for planning permission or listed building permission before painting the mill. The mill returned to its original white in October 2026.
