= St Ffinan's Church, Llanffinan =

Coordinates: 53.255188°N 4.256780°W

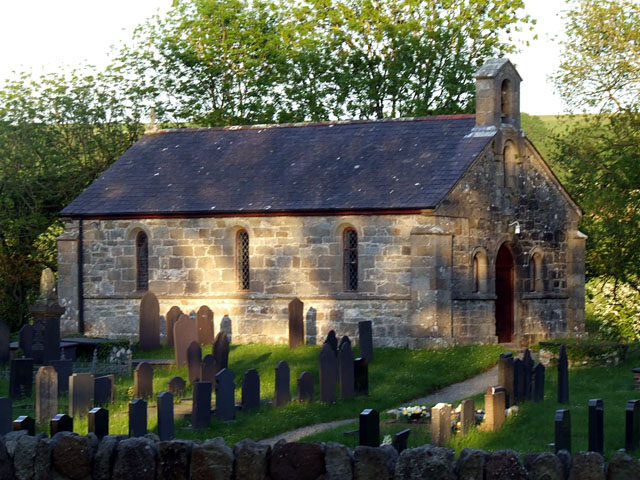
- The church from the north, showing the doorway at the west end

- Location in Anglesey
- Location: Llanffinan, Anglesey
- Country: Wales
- Denomination: Church in Wales
- Website: Church website

History
- Status: Parish church
- Founded: c. 620; Present building 1841
- Dedication: St Ffinan

Architecture
- Functional status: Active
- Heritage designation: Grade II
- Designated: 30 January 1968
- Architect: John Welch (1841)
- Architectural type: Church
- Style: Romanesque revival

Specifications
- Materials: Stone with slate roof

Administration
- Province: Province of Wales
- Diocese: Diocese of Bangor
- Archdeaconry: Bangor
- Deanery: Synod Ynys Mon
- Parish: Bro Cadwaladr

Clergy
- Vicar: The Reverend E C Williams

St Ffinan's Church, Llanffinan, is a small 19th-century parish church built in the Romanesque revival style, in Anglesey, north Wales. There has been a church in this area, even if not on this precise location, since at least 1254, and 19th-century writers state that St Ffinan established the first church here in the 7th century. The church was rebuilt in 1841, reusing a 12th-century font and 18th-century memorials, as well as the cross at the eastern end of the roof.

The church is still used for the worship by the Church in Wales, one of eight in a combined parish, and services are held weekly. It is a Grade II listed building, a national designation given to "buildings of special interest, which warrant every effort being made to preserve them", in particular because it is considered to be "a good essay in a simple Romanesque revival style". The church is at the end of a gravel track in the countryside of central Anglesey, about 2.5 kilometres (1.6 mi) from Llangefni, the county town. It is also on a footpath to Plas Penmynydd, once home to Owen Tudor, founder of the Tudor dynasty.

== History and location ==
St Ffinan's Church is in the countryside in the centre of Anglesey, north Wales, near the village of Talwrn, and about 2.5 kilometres (1.6 mi) away from Llangefni, the county town of Anglesey. The parish takes its name from the church: the Welsh word llan originally meant "enclosure" and then "church", with "-ffinan" denoting the saint.

A church was recorded in the area in 1254 during the Norwich Taxation of churches. The 19th-century writers and antiquarians Angharad Llwyd and Samuel Lewis said that St Ffinan, to whom the church is dedicated, established the first church here towards the beginning of the 7th century, possibly around 620. Llwyd described the old church in 1833 as "a small neat edifice". The building was designed by the architect John Welch and erected in 1841, with the first service held on 6 July of that year. Welch also designed the church of St Nidan, Llanidan, in the south of Anglesey, which was built between 1839 and 1843.

St Ffinan's is used for worship by the Church in Wales. It is one of eight churches in a combined parish called Bro Cadwaladr. It is within the deanery of Synod Ynys Môn, the archdeaconry of Bangor and the Diocese of Bangor. As of 2016, the vicar was Emlyn Williams. Williams was appointed in 2007; before that, the position had been vacant for 20 years while the Church in Wales attempted to fill it.

John Jones, who was the Dean of Bangor Cathedral from 1689 to 1727, was also rector of St Ffinan's during that time, as it was one of the benefices attached to the deanery. Jones is commememorated by a stone tablet on the wall of St Mary's Church, Pentraeth, also in Anglesey. The antiquarian Nicholas Owen was perpetual curate here from 1790 until he died in 1811; he is buried at the St Tyfrydog's Church, Llandyfrydog, Anglesey.

== Architecture and fittings ==
The church is small and rectangular, built from the stone with a slate roof; there is a bellcote at the west end of the roof. There is no internal structural division between the nave and the chancel. The style is Romanesque revival. There is a round-headed window in each of the three bays of the church, and a three-part window in the chancel. The doorway at the west end has small windows on either side, and a window above; a stone slab between the upper window and the doorway has "1841" upon it. Stained glass has been inserted into the windows in memory of parishioners.

A survey in 1937 by the Royal Commission on Ancient and Historical Monuments in Wales and Monmouthshire noted several items that had been preserved from the old church. The circular font, made of gritstone, dates from the 12th century; it has a "very crude interlacing strap ornament", and has been fitted upon a more modern base. There are two memorials from the 18th century, one dated 1705 to "Iohn Lloyd of Hirdre Faig" and one dated 1764 to "Hugh, son of Richard Hugh of Ty-hen". The churchyard contains one Commonwealth war grave from the First World War, of Private Evan Oswald Thomas, a Royal Welsh Fusiliers soldier from Talwrn.

== Assessment ==
St Ffinan's has national recognition and statutory protection from alteration as it has been designated as a Grade II listed building – the lowest of the three grades of listing, designating "buildings of special interest, which warrant every effort being made to preserve them". It was given this status on 30 January 1968 and has been listed because it is considered to be "a good essay in a simple Romanesque revival style". Cadw (the Welsh Government body responsible for the built heritage of Wales and the inclusion of Welsh buildings on the statutory lists) describes it as "a small rural church".

Samuel Lewis said that the new church was "a plain structure in the old English style, with strong buttresses, which have a good effect, being so well suited to the exposed situation of the building." Writing in 1846, the priest and antiquarian Harry Longueville Jones said that the church, "a modern erection of the Pseudo-Norman style", stood in "a highly picturesque situation." He said that the cross at the east end of the roof came from the old church.

A 2009 guide to the buildings of the region describes the 1841 rebuilding work as "rectangular and harsh". A 2006 guide to the churches of Anglesey says that it is "a good example of the small rural church", set in a "well-maintained churchyard". It also notes that its style "is quite different from most Anglesey churches".
