= Pont-Hwfa =

Coordinates: 53.310637°N 4.645324°W

- Location within Anglesey
- OS grid reference: SH 239 826
  - Cardiff: 140.8 mi (226.6 km)
  - London: 227.5 mi (366.1 km)
- Community: Holyhead
- Principal area: Anglesey
- Country: Wales
- Sovereign state: United Kingdom
- Post town: Holyhead
- Police: North Wales
- Fire: North Wales
- Ambulance: Welsh
- UK Parliament: Ynys Môn
- Senedd Cymru – Welsh Parliament: Bangor Conwy Môn

Pont-Hwfa (also Pont Hwfa or Pont-hwfa) is a village in the community of Holyhead, Anglesey, Wales, which is 140.8 miles (226.6 km) from Cardiff and 227.5 miles (366.1 km) from London.

== See also ==
- List of localities in Wales by population
