= Old Church of St Afran, St Ieuan and St Sannan, Llantrisant =

Coordinates: 53.3277°N 4.4798°W

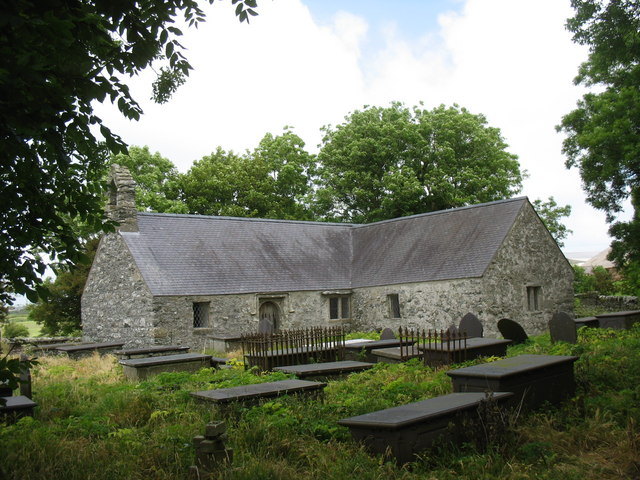
- The church from the southwest

- Location in Anglesey
- OS grid reference: SH 350 840
- Location: Llantrisant, Anglesey
- Country: Wales
- Denomination: Church in Wales
- Website: Friends of Friendless Churches

History
- Dedication: Saint Afran, Saint Ieuan and Saint Sannan

Architecture
- Functional status: Redundant
- Heritage designation: Grade II*
- Designated: 5 April 1971
- Architectural type: Church
- Closed: 1899

Specifications
- Materials: Stone, modern slate roof

The Old Church of St Afran, St Ieuan and St Sannan, Llantrisant, is a redundant church in the settlement of Llantrisant, Anglesey, Wales. It is designated by Cadw as a Grade II* listed building, and is under the care of the Friends of Friendless Churches. It is set in an isolated location off a country road and is adjacent to a farmstead.

== History ==
The dedication to a "Saint Afran" is probably a corruption of Saint Afan. (The 16th-century Peniarth MS 147 lists the church as dedicated to "Sannan and Afan and Evan".) Afan was a bishop and saint in Ceredigion and Brycheiniog during the 6th century. He was, however, related to the Cuneddan dynasty of Gwynedd and was claimed as an ancestor by a 10th-century Ieuan martyred by Viking raiders.

The church was built probably in the late 14th century, and the south chapel was added in the 17th century. In 1899 a new church was built nearer the centre of the settlement, some 1.5 kilometres (1 mi) to the east, and it became redundant. Its fabric deteriorated, by 1937 it was in a state of disrepair, and by 1970 it was in ruins and without a roof. It was restored in 1976–77. It was vested with the charity the Friends of Friendless Churches in 1978, who hold a 999-year lease with effect from 1 November 1978, and was one of the first of the Welsh churches to be acquired by the charity.

== Architecture ==
=== Exterior ===
It is built in stone and has a modern slate roof. Its plan is simple, with a continuous nave and chancel, and a chapel extending to the south. A stone gabled bellcote stands on the west end. In the south wall of the nave is a round-headed doorway. To the left is a single rectangular window, and to the right a double window, over which is a large rough stone. There is a rectangular doorway in the north wall with a single square window to its left. The east window consists of a pair of trefoiled lights with a small shield-shaped window between. In the south chapel there are double square-headed windows in the east and south walls, and a single rectangular window in the west wall.

=== Interior ===
Internally the church is paved with stone slabs. Most of the fittings and furniture presumably date back to the 18th century, including the box pews and benches. The altar is simple, consisting of a slate slab supported on piers; a simple cross is set into the wall behind it. The font dates from the 12th century and consists of a deep circular bowl on a cylindrical column standing on a stepped rough base. The font is not original to the church, but was moved from the church at Grove, Buckinghamshire when it was converted into a house in the 1970s. There are memorials on the walls, and a gravestone set on a chest on the floor of the nave.
