= Elim, Anglesey =

Village in Anglesey, Wales

Coordinates: 53°20′06″N 4°28′18″W

Elim
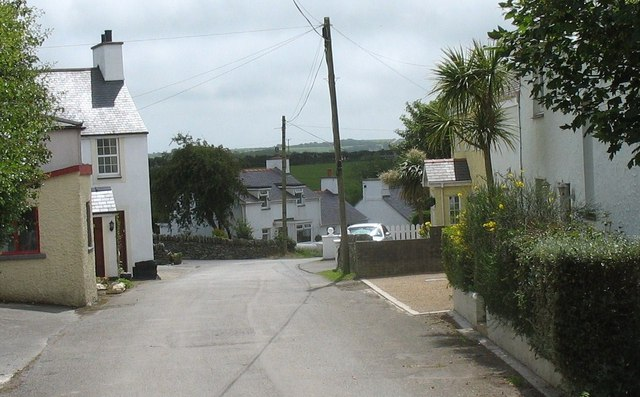

- Location within Anglesey
- OS grid reference: SH 3552 8484
  - Cardiff: 139 mi (224 km)
  - London: 222 mi (357 km)
- Community: Tref Alaw
- Principal area: Anglesey
- Preserved county: Gwynedd
- Country: Wales
- Sovereign state: United Kingdom
- Post town: Holyhead
- Police: North Wales
- Fire: North Wales
- Ambulance: Welsh
- UK Parliament: Ynys Môn
- Senedd Cymru – Welsh Parliament: Ynys Môn

Elim is a small village in west-central Anglesey, Wales, located around 1 mile (1.6 km) south-east of Llanddeusant and 3 miles (4.8 km) south-west of Llyn Alaw.

It is sited close to the Bedd Branwen ring cairn.
