= Tref Alaw =

Community in Anglesey, Wales

- Community
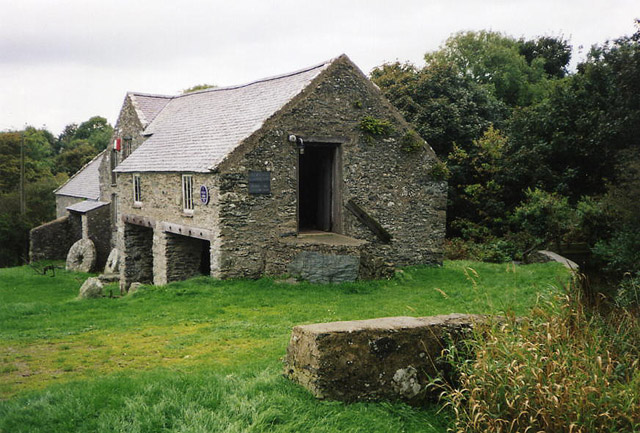
- The watermill at Llanddeusant

- Location within Anglesey
- Population: 581 (2011)
- OS grid reference: SH360847
- Principal area: Anglesey
- Preserved county: Gwynedd
- Country: Wales
- Sovereign state: United Kingdom
- Post town: Holyhead
- Postcode district: LL65
- Police: North Wales
- Fire: North Wales
- Ambulance: Welsh
- UK Parliament: Ynys Môn
- Senedd Cymru – Welsh Parliament: Ynys Môn
- List of places UK Wales Anglesey 53.34°N 4.47°W Map of the community

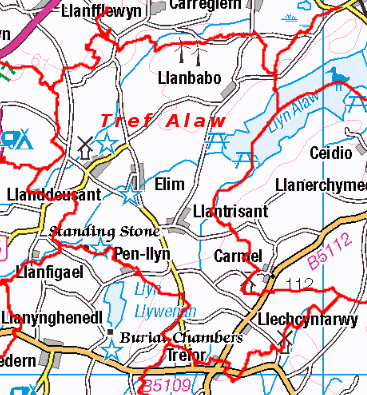
Boundaries of Tref Alaw community. The map covers an area 9.2 kilometres (5.7 miles) across and 9.9 kilometres (6.2 miles) north to south

Tref Alaw is a community in Anglesey, north Wales. The community takes in the area west and south west of the Llyn Alaw, a man made reservoir which is also the largest body of water on the island. The community consists of a wide network of dispersed farms, and five settlements. Two small villages, close to each other in the centre of the community area are Llanddeusant and Elim. Llantrisant is a hamlet a mile or so to the south-west of Elim. In the north west is the small village of Llanbabo, and in the far south is the tiny hamlet of Llechgynfarwy (also spelt Llechcynfarwy), of which the principal building is St Cynfarwy's Church. At the 2001 census the community had a population of 606 inhabitants, reducing to 581 at the 2011 census.

== Buildings and landmarks of note ==
Tref Alaw's main feature is Llyn Alaw a man made reservoir which was built in 1966. The northern part of the community is dominated by the Llyn Alaw wind farm which consists of 35 turbines.

West of Llanddeusant is Melin Llynon, Anglesey's only working windmill, a type of building once common on the island. Built during the Napoleonic Wars it remained in working order until damaged by a storm in 1918. It fell into disrepair until bought by Anglesey Borough Council in 1976, and was restored to working order in 1986. Alongside the mill is a reconstruction of an Iron Age house. Llanddeusant is also the location of Melin Hywel, a watermill restored in both 1975 and 1985, though it is again in a state of disrepair.

There are four Scheduled Monuments within the community.

Glan-Alaw Standing Stone
(53.3433°N 4.4524°W), SH368857. A massive stone, presumed to date from the Bronze Age, 400m west of Bod-deiniol farm.

Tregwehelydd Standing Stone
also known as Maen y Gored. The stone is a property in the care of Cadw, (53.3195°N 4.4926°W, OS grid ref SH340831), accessible from a footpath via Tregwehelydd Farm. It stands on a low knoll with wide views over the surrounding countryside, is some 8 feet (2.4 m) high, and a more or less even rectangular shape. The stone has split along its bedding planes, and is now in three pieces, which were bolted back together in 1969, with large metal straps, and set in a concrete base to hold it upright. A second stone, of similar dimensions, lies horizontal, close by.

Bedd Branwen Round Cairn
(53.3363°N 4.4628°W, OS grid ref SH361849) The cairn is east of Elim, close to the River Alaw downstream from the reservoir. The name became attached to the cairn when an excavation of 1813 found an urn with cremated remains in it. It is Welsh for 'Branwen's Grave'. Branwen is described in the Mabinogion as being buried beside the Alaw, having died of a broken heart after creating a rift between the Welsh and Irish warriors. However the cairn is much older than the medieval text of the Mabinogion. Radiocarbon dating in 1980 suggests the central stone pillar was erected some time before 2000BC, and that the mound of stones, with cremation burials, was raised around the pillar some 700 years later. In an excavation of 1966 three cremation urns, along with beads, amber and carved jet were identified as being the original interments, and a further four cremation burials were added to the cemetery subsequently.

Y Werthyr Hillfort
(53.2758°N 4.4391°W, OS Grid ref. SH374782). An Iron Age hill fort with what would once have been imposing ramparts on a hilltop between Elim and Llantrisant, although most of the earthworks are now ploughed out.

== See also ==
- Afon Alaw, a river in the community
