= Llechylched =

Coordinates: 53°16′09″N 4°28′04″W

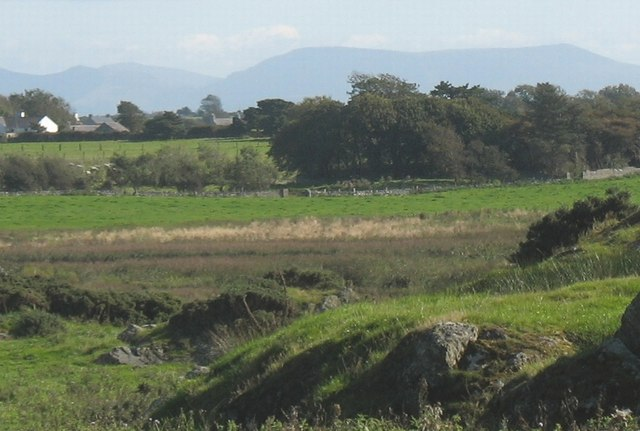
View across the northern section of Cors Crigyll towards the site of Llechylched Church

Llechylched is a hamlet and former parish in Anglesey, Wales.

At the 1971 census the civil parish of Llechylched had a population of 792. In 1974 it became a community, and in 1984 the community was abolished.
