= Tyn-y-Gongl =

Village in Anglesey, Wales

Coordinates: 53.3214°N 4.2345°W

- Location within Anglesey
- OS grid reference: SH511828
- Community: Llanfair-Mathafarn-Eithaf
- Principal area: Anglesey
- Preserved county: Gwynedd
- Country: Wales
- Sovereign state: United Kingdom
- Post town: TYN-Y-GONGL
- Postcode district: LL74
- Dialling code: 01248
- Police: North Wales
- Fire: North Wales
- Ambulance: Welsh
- UK Parliament: Ynys Môn
- Senedd Cymru – Welsh Parliament: Ynys Môn

Tyn-y-Gongl or Ty'n-y-gongl is a village just west of the town of Benllech and east of Brynteg, on the island of Anglesey (Welsh: Ynys Môn), north Wales.
