= Caim, Anglesey =

Coordinates: 53.305°N 4.069°W

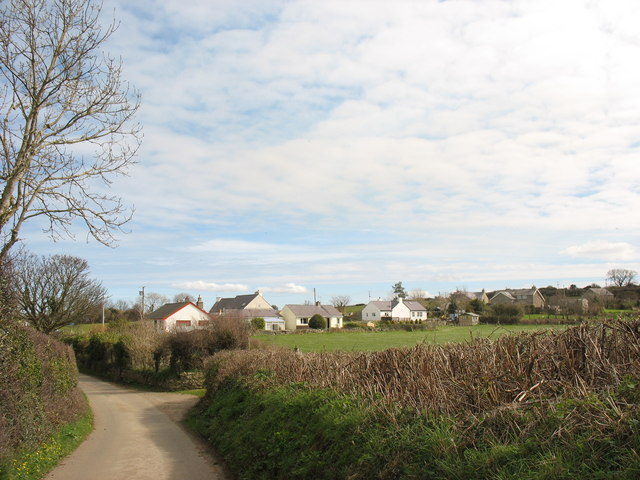

Caim is a hamlet in the community of Llangoed, Anglesey, Wales, which is 144.3 miles (232.2 km) from Cardiff and 225.8 miles (363.4 km) from London. Caim is represented in the Senedd by Rhun ap Iorwerth (Plaid Cymru) and is part of the Ynys Môn constituency in the House of Commons.

== See also ==
- List of localities in Wales by population
