= Maenaddwyn =

Village in Anglesey, Wales

Coordinates: 53.3310°N 4.3152°W

- Old phone booth

- Location within Anglesey
- Community: Llanddyfnan
- Principal area: Anglesey
- Country: Wales
- Sovereign state: United Kingdom

Maenaddwyn is a village in the community of Llanddyfnan, in Anglesey, in north-west Wales. Maenaddwyn has an elevation of 98.6 metres (323 ft).

There is a standing stone between the village and Capel Coch. Maenaddwyn means stone of Addwyn, although the original stone was removed but another stone located south is popularly called "Maen Addwyn".

== Other websites ==
- Official website
