= Pen-y-garnedd =

Coordinates: 53.26579°N 4.194074°W

- Location within Anglesey
- OS grid reference: SH 5370 7659
  - Cardiff: 130.6 mi (210.2 km)
  - London: 210.1 mi (338.1 km)
- Community: Pentraeth
- Principal area: Anglesey
- Country: Wales
- Sovereign state: United Kingdom
- Post town: Pentraeth
- Police: North Wales
- Fire: North Wales
- Ambulance: Welsh
- UK Parliament: Ynys Môn
- Senedd Cymru – Welsh Parliament: Ynys Môn

Pen-y-garnedd is a village in the community of Pentraeth, Anglesey, Wales, which is 130.6 miles (210.2 km) from Cardiff and 210.1 miles (338.2 km) from London.

== See also ==
- List of localities in Wales by population
