= Soar, Anglesey =

Village in Aberffraw, Ynys Môn, Wales

Coordinates: 53.221178°N 4.419235°W

Soar
- Location within Anglesey
- OS grid reference: SH 3858 7208
  - Cardiff: 131.2 mi (211.1 km)
  - London: 216.3 mi (348.1 km)
- Community: Aberffraw
- Principal area: Anglesey
- Country: Wales
- Sovereign state: United Kingdom
- Post town: Bodorgan
- Police: North Wales
- Fire: North Wales
- Ambulance: Welsh
- UK Parliament: Ynys Môn
- Senedd Cymru – Welsh Parliament: Ynys Môn

Soar is a village in the community of Aberffraw, Anglesey, Wales, which is 131.2 miles (211.1 km) from Cardiff and 216.3 miles (348.1 km) from London.

== See also ==
- List of localities in Wales by population
