= St Mary's Church, Pentraeth =

Church in Anglesey, Wales

Coordinates: 53.282349°N 4.215703°W

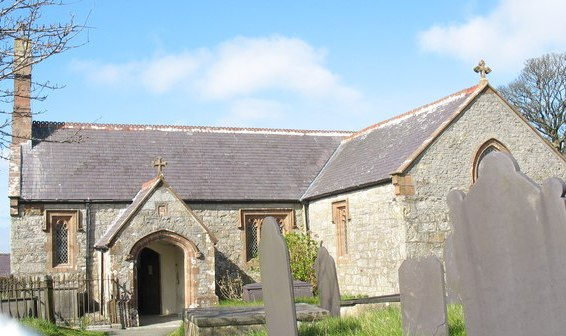
- The south side of the church, showing the porch (left) and chapel (right)

- Location in Anglesey
- Location: Pentraeth, Anglesey
- Country: Wales
- Denomination: Church in Wales

History
- Status: Parish church
- Founded: Earliest parts of present building date from between 12th and 14th centuries
- Dedication: St Mary

Architecture
- Functional status: Active
- Heritage designation: Grade II
- Designated: 30 January 1968
- Architect: Henry Kennedy (1882 rebuilding)
- Architectural type: Church

Specifications
- Length: 50 ft 3 in (15.3 m) (nave)
- Materials: Rubble masonry

Administration
- Province: Province of Wales
- Diocese: Diocese of Bangor
- Archdeaconry: Bangor
- Deanery: Tindaethwy and Menai
- Parish: Llanfair Mathafarn Eithaf with Llanbedrgoch with Pentraeth

Clergy
- Rector: Venerable R P Davies

St Mary's Church, Pentraeth is a small medieval parish church in the village of Pentraeth, in Anglesey, north Wales. The date of construction is unknown, but is probably from some time between the 12th to 14th centuries. A church dedicated to St Mary was recorded here in 1254, but there is a tradition that there was an older church dedicated to St Geraint, an early British saint. Some medieval stonework remains in three walls of the building (the west wall, and parts of the north and south walls). A chapel was added to the south side in the 16th or 17th century. The church was altered and refurbished during the 19th century, including an extensive rebuilding by Henry Kennedy, the architect for the Diocese of Bangor, in 1882. St Mary's is still used for worship by the Church in Wales, and is one of three churches in a combined parish. Its conservation is specifically included in the aims of a Chester-based charity that promotes health and the arts in Anglesey and the north-west of England.

It is a Grade II listed building, a national designation given to "buildings of special interest, which warrant every effort being made to preserve them", in particular because of the retention of medieval fabric in a predominately 19th-century building, and its "fine" memorials. It is built from rubble masonry with a slate roof, and part of a font thought to date from the 12th century has been reused as a water basin in the porch. St Mary's has a number of memorials from the 18th and 19th centuries, some commemorating residents of a nearby manor house. There was once a tradition of decorating the interior with paper garlands, although writers differ on whether this was to celebrate parishioners' weddings or to mark the death of unmarried women. It was one of only two churches in Anglesey included by the 18th-century writer Francis Grose in his multi-volume guide to English and Welsh antiquities.

== History and location ==
St Mary's Church is in the middle of Pentraeth, Anglesey, about 4 miles (6.4 km) from the town of Menai Bridge. It is situated at the junction of the A5025 and the B5109 roads. The date of the foundation of the first religious building on this site is unknown. There is a tradition that there was originally a church here dedicated to St Geraint, an early British saint, since the old name for the village was Llanfair-Bettws-Geraint. However, a Pentraeth church dedicated to St Mary was recorded in the Norwich Taxation of 1254. The present building probably dates from sometime between the 12th and the 14th centuries, with the nave and chancel being medieval in origin.

A chapel was added to the south side of the parish church at the end of the 16th century or the early part of the 17th century. A restoration of the interior took place in 1821 with further changes in 1839. Henry Kennedy, the architect of the Diocese of Bangor, oversaw a partial but extensive rebuilding in 1882, which included reconstruction of the east wall and the addition of the porch on the south side. He also added an internal arch to mark the sanctuary as part of rebuilding or extending of the chancel. A reredos and some other fittings were added in the first part of the 20th century.

St Mary's is still in use for worship and belongs to the Church in Wales. It is one of three churches in the combined benefice of Llanfair Mathafarn Eithaf with Llanbedrgoch with Pentraeth. The church is in the deanery of Tindaethwy and Menai, the archdeaconry of Bangor and the Diocese of Bangor. As of 2012, the position of rector is held by the Venerable R P Davies, Archdeacon of Bangor.

The "conservation, protection and improvement" of St Mary's are included in the aims of the Tyrer Charitable Trust, a Chester-based charity that promotes health and the arts in Anglesey and north-west England; it is the only church so specified in the charity's aims and objectives.

== Architecture and fittings ==
The church is built from irregularly positioned pieces of rubble masonry, and Kennedy added red sandstone dressings in his 1882 work. The nave measures 50 feet 3 inches long by 17 feet 3 inches wide (about 15.3 by 5.3 m); the chancel is the same width, and about 7 feet (2.1 m) long. The chapel is 17 feet by 20 feet 6 inches (about 5.2 by 6.25 m). There is medieval masonry in three of the walls: the west wall, and the lower parts of the north and south walls. The roof is made of slate, with a stone bellcote containing one bell at the west end. Inside, the wooden trusses of the roof are visible. The trusses were re-used when the roof was reconstructed. The church is entered through a porch on the south side, added in the 19th century, and a Tudor arch doorway; the porch contains a stone piscina (a water basin), said to be part of a font dating from the 12th century. An old entrance in the north wall of the nave has been blocked up. Two of the three windows in the north wall are from the 19th century. The third, nearest to the east end, is from the early 17th century and has a square frame. The eight-sided font also dates from the 19th century. The 1937 survey by the Royal Commission on Ancient and Historical Monuments in Wales and Monmouthshire also recorded the existence of an oak poor box, with iron straps, bearing the date of 1740, and a plain silver cup from about 1685.

The chancel and the south chapel are each separated from the nave by arches; the chancel arch, which was added by Kennedy in 1882, is decorated with carvings of an eagle on one side and a lamb on the other. Steps lead up from the nave to the chancel, with a further step marking the sanctuary. The east window dates from the late 14th or the early 15th century, although it has been rebuilt, with three lights (vertical sections separated by mullions). These are topped with tracery (decorative stone work) and cinquefoils (a five leaf pattern). It contains stained glass depicting St Mary and St John, added in 1890. The east window in the chapel is of similar design to the 17th-century window in the north wall of the nave, and dates from the late 16th or early 17th century; restoration work has been carried out on it. The south window has a pointed arch with two lights topped by cinquefoils; it is above a sill for an older window. There is also a window in the west wall of the chapel.

St Mary's contains a number of memorials from the 18th and 19th centuries. Members of the families associated with Plas Gwyn, a nearby manor house, have their memorials in the chapel. John Jones, who was Dean of Bangor Cathedral from 1689 to 1727, was born at Plas Gwyn, and is commemorated with a stone tablet on the south wall of the chancel. Another native of Pentraeth, the cleric and writer Thomas Owen, who died in 1812, also has a tablet in the chancel. Charles Vivian, 2nd Baron Vivian (who died in 1886), and his wife Mary are remembered with a bronze tablet on the east wall of the chapel. There are other memorials on the walls of the chapel and the nave. The south window of the chapel has stained glass in memory of Claud Panton Vivian, of Plas Gwyn, who died at the age of 24 during the Second World War. The churchyard has a number of graves for members of the Vivian family, and their plot contains "four beautifully-carved Celtic crosses." The churchyard also contains two Commonwealth war graves, of a South Lancashire Regiment soldier of World War I and a Royal Navy sailor of World War II.

The church used to be decorated with paper garlands. This tradition was noted in the 18th century, when a writer thought that they symbolised the "hymeneal union" (i.e. marriage) of parishioners, because the garlands each had a pair of hands in the centre. In 1833, another writer said that the garlands marked the death of unmarried women, but the tradition was no longer observed.

== Assessment ==
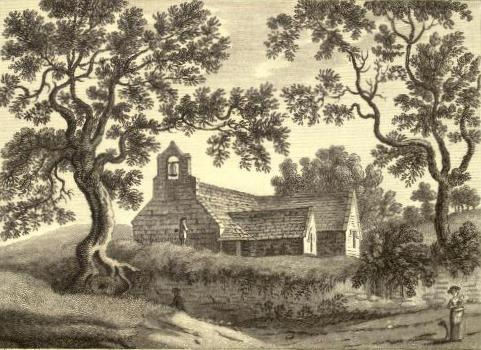
An 18th-century view, included in Francis Grose's guide to the antiquities of Anglesey

St Mary's has national recognition and statutory protection from alteration as it has been designated as a Grade II listed building – the lowest of the three grades of listing, designating "buildings of special interest, which warrant every effort being made to preserve them". It was given this status on 30 January 1968, and has been listed because it is "a predominantly late 19th-century church which retains some Medieval fabric". Cadw (the Welsh Government body responsible for the built heritage of Wales and for the inclusion of Welsh buildings on the statutory lists) also notes "some fine 18th-century and 19th-century memorials."

The 18th-century writer Francis Grose, who wrote a multi-volume guide to the antiquities of England and Wales, included St Mary'a in his survey of Anglesey, one of only two churches on the island that he featured (the other being St Cybi's, Holyhead). He said that this "little edifice is more remarkable for its simplicity, and the beauty of the rural scene by which it is surrounded, than for any matters of antiquity or curiosity in its construction, or contained within its walls". The Welsh antiquarian Angharad Llwyd and the writer Samuel Lewis (both writing in the 19th century before the 1882 alterations) each described St Mary's as a "small neat edifice". They particularly noted the internal and external monuments to members of various local families.

Writing in 1847, the clergyman and antiquarian Harry Longueville Jones said that St Mary's was "remarkable for being in one of the sweetest spots in the isle of Anglesey" The interior, he said, was "greatly blocked up with pews", but was in "excellent repair", with "a degree of neatness and comfort about it quite unusual in this district." The roof timbers, he commented, were "closely set together, light in section, but producing a good effect." The Welsh politician and church historian Sir Stephen Glynne visited a couple of years later, in 1849. He described St Mary's as being in a "pretty" situation, "surrounded by trees". He noted the "fair" east window and the "rude timber framework" of the roof. In 2006, a guide to the churches of Anglesey noted that the red sandstone used in the windows and in the bellcote was showing signs of "severe weathering" in places.
