= Paradwys =

Village in Anglesey, Wales

Coordinates: 53.207938°N 4.362197°W

- Location within Anglesey
- Principal area: Anglesey
- Preserved county: Gwynedd
- Country: Wales
- Sovereign state: United Kingdom
- Police: North Wales
- Fire: North Wales
- Ambulance: Welsh
- UK Parliament: Ynys Môn
- Senedd Cymru – Welsh Parliament: Ynys Môn

Paradwys is a village in Anglesey, in north-west Wales.
