= Bethel, Anglesey =

Coordinates: 53.2070°N 4.4015°W

Bethel
- Village
- Interactive map of Bethel
- Country: United Kingdom
- Country: Wales
- County: Anglesey
- Parish: Bodorgan

Bethel is a relatively small and quiet village set centrally within the wider community and larger Parish of Bodorgan. The village is located inland (approximately three miles) from the south-western coast on the isle of Anglesey in North Wales.

== Community ==
The village consists mainly of a cluster of detached private dwellings and a few social housing properties that have become mostly former tenant owned since the social and political revolution of the 1980s. These in turn circumvent the village shop, Bethel Stores/Post Office and the new Medical Surgery.

During the late 19th century and up until the 1950s the village and the nearby Bodorgan railway station were a hive of commercial and social activity. The present village shop, Bethel Stores, was constructed by Harold and Dorothy Mawson in the 1960s as a result of a major demolition programme affecting many older properties deemed to be in a dangerous state of construction and repair - including their own general stores business, “Siop Isaf” ( Lower Shop”), in the village. The new Bethel Stores (the former Bethel Filling Station and Motorique Autoparts) stands on ground that was used as in-fill to reclaim an area that was known locally as Chwarel Bethel (Bethel Quarry), a source of some relatively unique, fairly valuable and sought after mineral deposits by the Bone-China /Ceramic industry of the Potteries. Some local inhabitants once indicated that they had the "superior bone-china tea sets" made from the quarried stone (a type of quartz) after it had returned to the area in its new, manufactured state. Beside the quarrying industry however, Bethel could arguably boast that it had a vibrant commercial centre to some extent that existed until relatively recent times.

=== Facilities ===
The area once supported two general goods/grocery stores. Besides Shop Isaf a second business also operated in the village, known as Bryn Meilir (Meilir's Hill Stores). Both shops were supported by the villagers and the wider farming community. However, in a blatantly obvious show of partisanship, one was supported by the Chapel-going community whilst the other was held in place by the Church-fraternity. One of Bryn Meilir's occupants had close family ties with a high-ranking member of the Church in Wales. According to wide-held belief, it was suggested that many locals chose to alternate their allegiance to the great Lord (and therefore obtain favour in either "camp" during periods of food rationing) by following either path on alternate Sundays or morning/afternoon services.

The village once boasted a blacksmith, a leather/shoe repairers, coal merchants, police station, petrol filling station (up to the early 21st century) a garage, motor-parts and accessory shop, post office, surgery, chapel, school and church-hall, china shop and joinery workshop/carpenters. In addition, there were two well frequented hostelries stood almost side by side opposite the railway concourse at Bodorgan Station. These two “pubs” - the Bodorgan and the Meyrick Arms were divided only by the positioning of the Cattle-Market and it was on such market days that farmers and the general public gathered to sell or purchase fine beasts or agricultural products and equipment. The railway played its part too by transporting the bartered for beasts as well as passengers to and from the area.
