= St Michael's Church, Penrhoslligwy =

Church in Anglesey, Wales

Coordinates: 53.3483°N 4.2841°W

St Michael's Church
- St Michael's Church
- Country: Wales
- Denomination: Church in Wales

Architecture
- Heritage designation: Grade II*
- Designated: 5 December 1970
- Architectural type: Church
- Style: Medieval

St Michael's Church is the parish church of Penrhoslligwy, a village near Moelfre in the north-east of the island of Anglesey, in Gwynedd, Wales. With datable components from around 1400, the building is listed at Grade II* and was restored in 1865. (Penrhoslligwy is also sometimes written Penrhos Lligwy or Penrhos-Lligwy; the spelling Penrhoslligwy is used by the Church in Wales.)

== External list ==
- Media related to St Michael's Church, Penrhos Lligwy at Wikimedia Commons
