= Capel Mawr =

Coordinates: 53.218768°N 4.373469°W

- Location within Anglesey
- OS grid reference: SH 4163 7171
  - Cardiff: 130.3 mi (209.7 km)
  - London: 214.6 mi (345.4 km)
- Community: Llangristiolus
- Principal area: Anglesey
- Country: Wales
- Sovereign state: United Kingdom
- Post town: Bodorgan
- Police: North Wales
- Fire: North Wales
- Ambulance: Welsh
- UK Parliament: Ynys Môn
- Senedd Cymru – Welsh Parliament: Ynys Môn

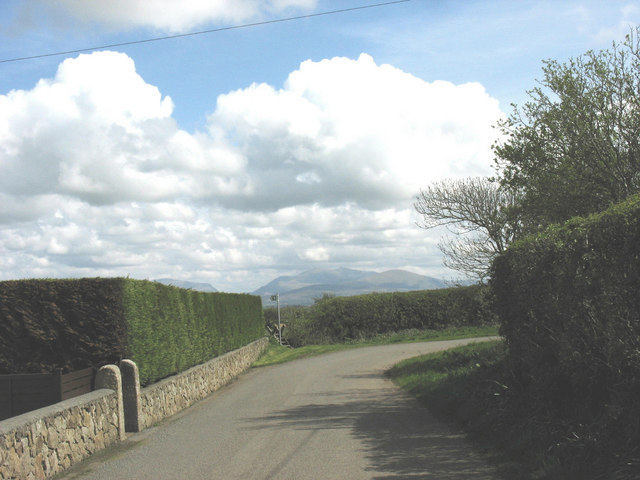
A road at the Capel Mawr

Capel Mawr is a hamlet in the community of Llangristiolus, Anglesey, Wales, which is 130.3 miles (209.7 km) from Cardiff and 214.6 miles (345.4 km) from London. The chapel of the same name (Capel Mawr) was built in 1773.

== See also ==
- List of localities in Wales by population
