= Capel Gwyn =

Village in Anglesey, Wales

Coordinates: 53.251562°N 4.476437°W

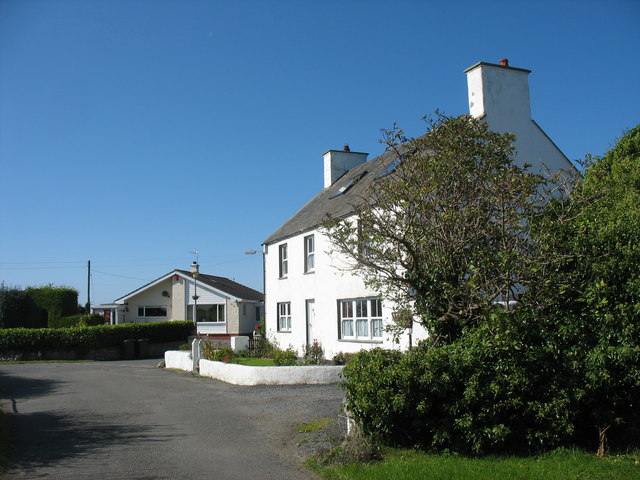

- Location within Anglesey
- Principal area: Anglesey
- Preserved county: Gwynedd
- Country: Wales
- Sovereign state: United Kingdom
- Police: North Wales
- Fire: North Wales
- Ambulance: Welsh
- UK Parliament: Ynys Môn
- Senedd Cymru – Welsh Parliament: Ynys Môn

Capel Gwyn is a village in Anglesey, in north-west Wales, in the community of Bryngwran. The village's chapel was established in 1794.

In Welsh, Capel Gwyn means "white chapel".
