= Llynfaes =

Coordinates: 53.278164°N 4.384561°W

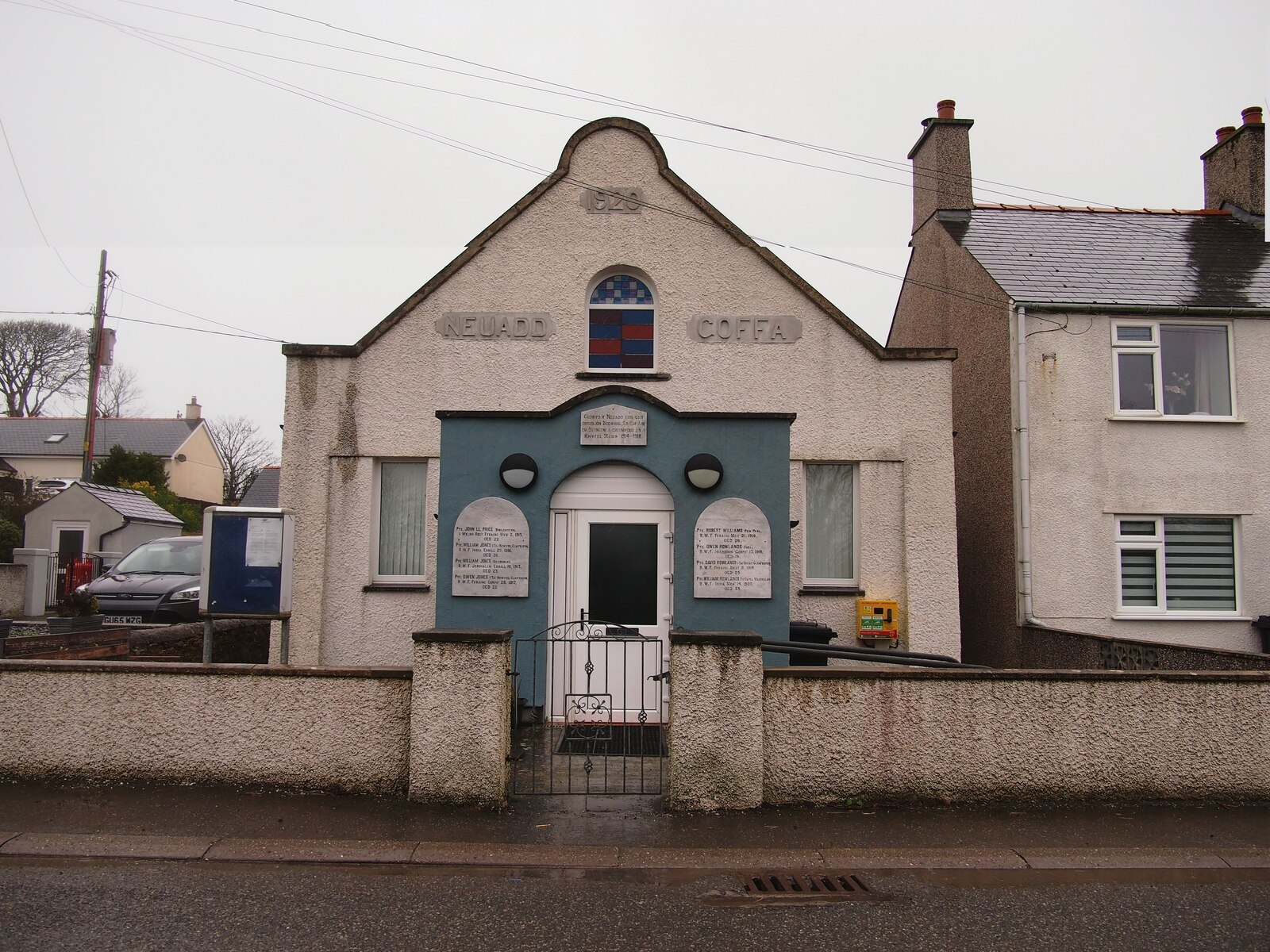
- Community centre on B5109 road

- Location within Anglesey
- OS grid reference: SH 4111 7834
  - Cardiff: 134.3 mi (216.1 km)
  - London: 217.2 mi (349.5 km)
- Community: Bodffordd
- Principal area: Anglesey
- Country: Wales
- Sovereign state: United Kingdom
- Post town: Holyhead
- Police: North Wales
- Fire: North Wales
- Ambulance: Welsh
- UK Parliament: Ynys Môn
- Senedd Cymru – Welsh Parliament: Ynys Môn

Llynfaes is a hamlet in the community of Bodffordd, Anglesey, Wales. It was the location of Belan Chapel, formerly in the parish of Bodwrog.

== See also ==
- List of localities in Wales by population
