= Llaingoch =

Area of Holyhead, Anglesey, Wales

Coordinates: 53.311°N 4.666°W

Llaingoch (Welsh pronunciation) is an area of Holyhead in North Wales that lies between the town centre and Holyhead Mountain. The name comes from the Welsh llain, plot or patch of land, and goch, red.
