= Caergeiliog =

Village in Anglesey, Wales

Coordinates: 53.274708°N 4.534475°W

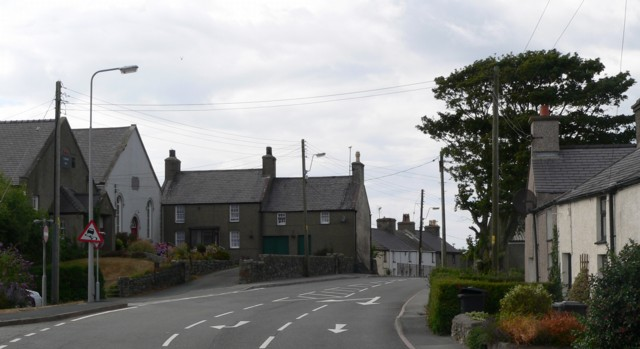

- Location within Anglesey
- Population: 355
- Principal area: Anglesey
- Preserved county: Gwynedd
- Country: Wales
- Sovereign state: United Kingdom
- Post town: Holyhead
- Postcode district: LL65
- Dialling code: 01407
- Police: North Wales
- Fire: North Wales
- Ambulance: Welsh
- UK Parliament: Ynys Môn
- Senedd Cymru – Welsh Parliament: Ynys Môn

Caergeiliog is a village on Anglesey island, north-west Wales. It is in the community of Llanfair-yn-Neubwll and has a population of 355. The name derives from Welsh, and is a combination of Caer, meaning 'castle' or 'fort', and ceiliog, meaning 'cockerel'. It is unclear where the second element came from.

Caergeiliog is on the A5 road which here follows the route of Thomas Telford's road to Holyhead.

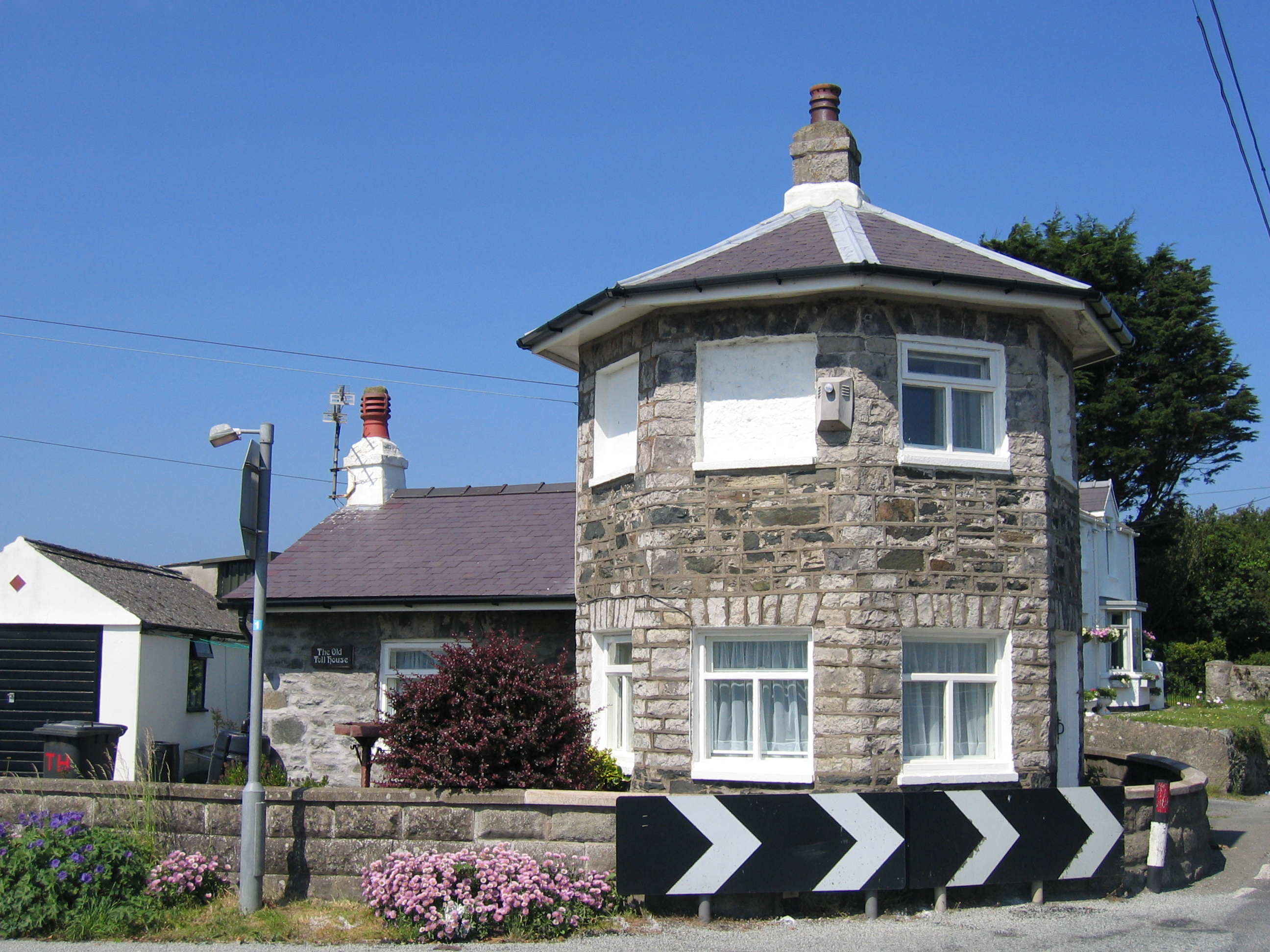
Caergeiliog Toll House by the A5

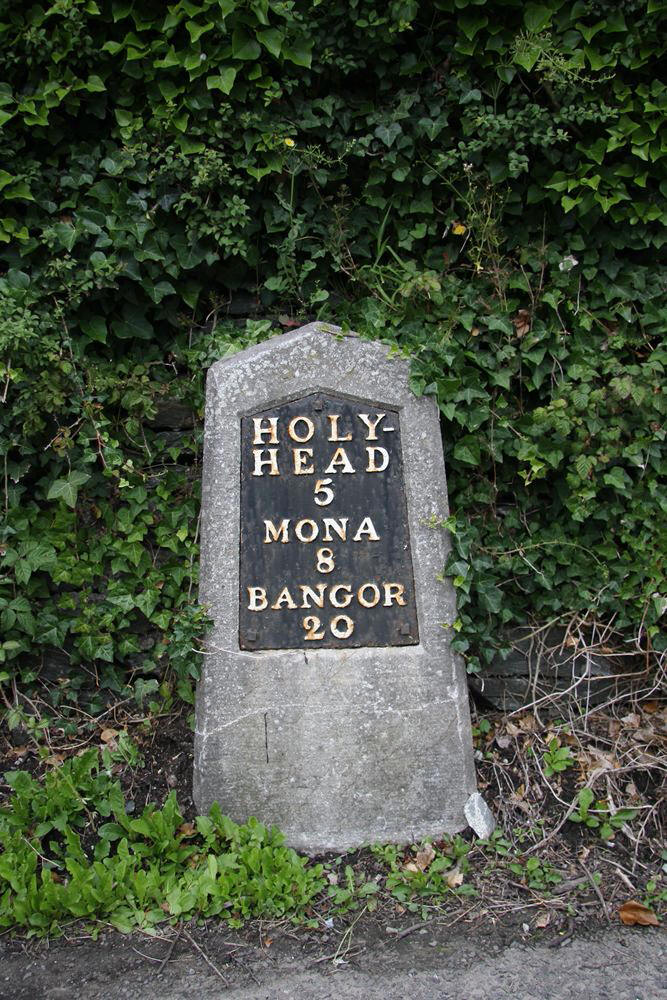
Milestone by the Holyhead Road, Caergeiliog
