= Pengorffwysfa =

Village in Anglesey, Wales

Coordinates: 53.402743°N 4.30844°W

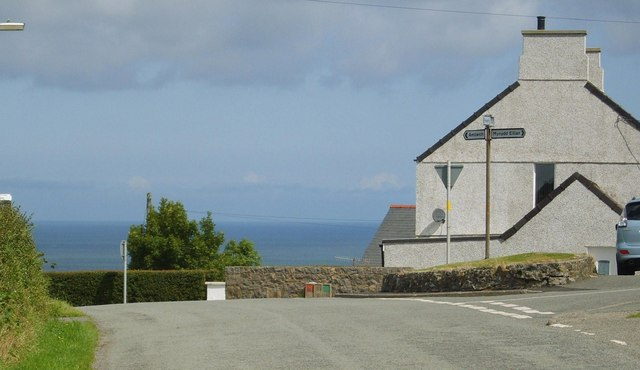

- Location within Anglesey
- Principal area: Anglesey
- Preserved county: Gwynedd
- Country: Wales
- Sovereign state: United Kingdom
- Police: North Wales
- Fire: North Wales
- Ambulance: Welsh
- UK Parliament: Ynys Môn
- Senedd Cymru – Welsh Parliament: Ynys Môn

Pengorffwysfa is a village in Anglesey, in north-west Wales. It is one of several dispersed settlements in the central area of Llaneilian Community, north of Penysarn and south of Llaneilian village.

The village lies on the crossroad between Penysarn and Porth Eilian and Point Lynas Lighthouse, with turnings down towards Amlwch Port and Amlwch town, and sits on the ascent towards Llaneilian Mountain and Dulas Bay. The crossroad forms part of the National Cycle Network Route 566, known as the Copper Trail, taking in the north coast of Anglesey (a designated Area of Outstanding Natural Beauty) and the nearby remains of the historical copper mines at Parys Mountain.

The village has a Calvinist chapel, Capel Seilo, built in 1835 to replace a smaller chapel built in 1826. The Chapel closed in 1999, with services continuing in the adjoining Sunday school rooms built in 1896.

Map of Pengorffwysfa and part of Llaneilian Community.
