= Capel Coch =

Village in Anglesey, Wales

Coordinates: 53.315523°N 4.313638°W

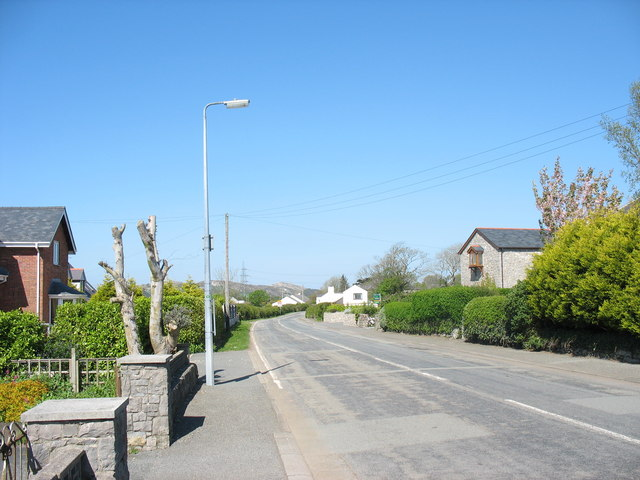

- Location within Anglesey
- Principal area: Anglesey
- Preserved county: Gwynedd
- Country: Wales
- Sovereign state: United Kingdom
- Post town: Llangefni
- Police: North Wales
- Fire: North Wales
- Ambulance: Welsh
- UK Parliament: Ynys Môn
- Senedd Cymru – Welsh Parliament: Ynys Môn

Capel Coch is a village in Anglesey, in north-west Wales. Much of the village overlooks Cors Erddreiniog National Nature Reserve. It is in the community of Llanddyfnan.
