= Coedana =

Hamlet in Anglesey, Wales

Coordinates: 53.31306°N 4.356741°W

- Location within Anglesey
- Principal area: Anglesey
- Preserved county: Gwynedd
- Country: Wales
- Sovereign state: United Kingdom
- Police: North Wales
- Fire: North Wales
- Ambulance: Welsh
- UK Parliament: Ynys Môn
- Senedd Cymru – Welsh Parliament: Bangor Conwy Môn

Coedana is a hamlet in Anglesey, in north-west Wales., in the community of Llanerchymedd. Until 1984 Coedana was a community itself.
