= Llantrisant, Anglesey =

Hamlet in Anglesey, Wales

Coordinates: 53.324°N 4.459°W

Llantrisant
- Location within Anglesey
- OS grid reference: SH363835
- Principal area: Anglesey
- Country: Wales
- Sovereign state: United Kingdom
- Post town: HOLYHEAD
- Postcode district: LL65
- Dialling code: 01407
- Police: North Wales
- Fire: North Wales
- Ambulance: Welsh
- UK Parliament: Ynys Môn
- Senedd Cymru – Welsh Parliament: Bangor Conwy Môn

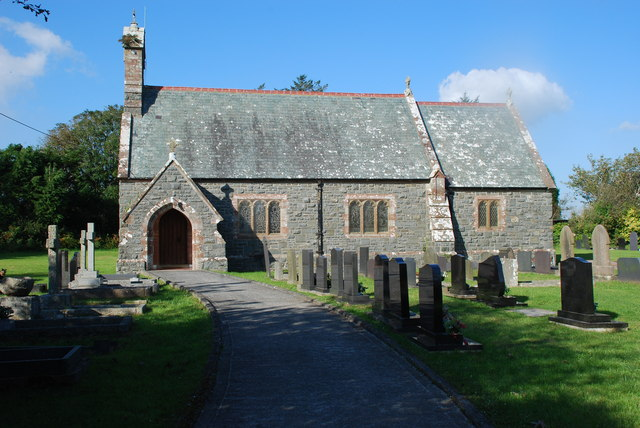
Eglwys Llantrisant

Llantrisant (Welsh pronunciation; Welsh for "parish of the three saints") is a hamlet in Anglesey, Wales. It is in the community of Tref Alaw, and was a community itself until 1984.

Its parish church is dedicated to Saints Afran, Ieuan, and Sanan. The parish's former church is now a protected building. Browne Willis and Sabine Baring-Gould considered "Afran" to be a corruption of Afan, a saint of Ceredigion and Brecknockshire. (The 16th-century Peniarth MS 147 concurs, listing the church as dedicated to "Sannan and Afan and Evan".) St Afan was related to the Cuneddan dynasty of Gwynedd and was claimed as an ancestor by a 10th-century Ieuan martyred by Viking raiders.

In 1833 it was noted that copper ore had been found "in considerable quantities" near Meinir farm in the parish, but no mines had been opened.
