= Llangwyfan, Anglesey =

Coordinates: 53.194502°N 4.494372°W

Llangwyfan
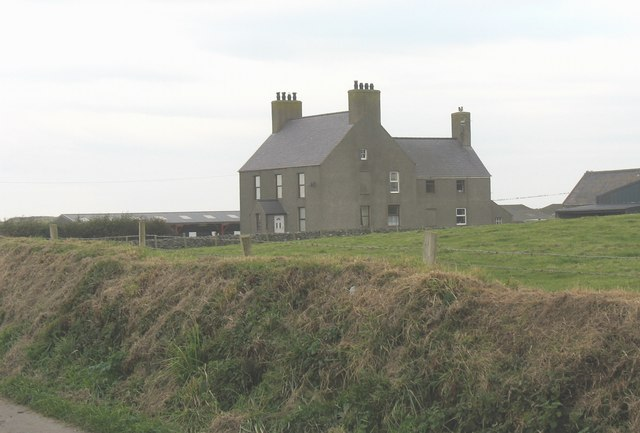
- Plas Llangwyfan Farmhouse

- Location within Anglesey
- OS grid reference: SH 3346 6928
  - Cardiff: 130.8 mi (210.5 km)
  - London: 218 mi (351 km)
- Community: Aberffraw
- Principal area: Anglesey
- Country: Wales
- Sovereign state: United Kingdom
- Post town: Tŷ Croes
- Police: North Wales
- Fire: North Wales
- Ambulance: Welsh
- UK Parliament: Ynys Môn
- Senedd Cymru – Welsh Parliament: Bangor Conwy Môn

Llangwyfan is a hamlet and former parish in the community of Aberffraw, Anglesey, Wales. It is named for Saint Cwyfan.

== See also ==
- List of localities in Wales by population
