= Capel Parc =

Coordinates: 53°21′28″N 4°20′02″W

- Location within Anglesey
- OS grid reference: SH 4477 8707
  - Cardiff: 138.6 mi (223.1 km)
  - London: 218.4 mi (351.5 km)
- Community: Llandyfrydog
- Principal area: Anglesey
- Country: Wales
- Sovereign state: United Kingdom
- Post town: Llannerch-y-medd
- Police: North Wales
- Fire: North Wales
- Ambulance: Welsh
- UK Parliament: Ynys Môn
- Senedd Cymru – Welsh Parliament: Ynys Môn

Capel Parc is a hamlet in the community of Rhosybol, Anglesey, Wales, which is 138.6 miles (223 km) from Cardiff and 218.4 miles (351.5 km) from London.

History:

There was a chapel in the Village, named Capel-Y-Parc,which is where the name of the Village originates.

When Parys Mountain was the largest copper mine in the world during the 1780s, the surrounding areas—including Capel Parc—were completely integrated into the local mining infrastructure, agricultural support networks, and transport links feeding into the nearby port town of Amlwch.

To the south of the village is Melin Esgob (an early 19th century water corn mill), which is a Grade II listed building.

== See also ==
- List of localities in Wales by population
