= Rhosyr =

Community in Anglesey, Wales

Coordinates: 53.16°N 4.36°W

- Community
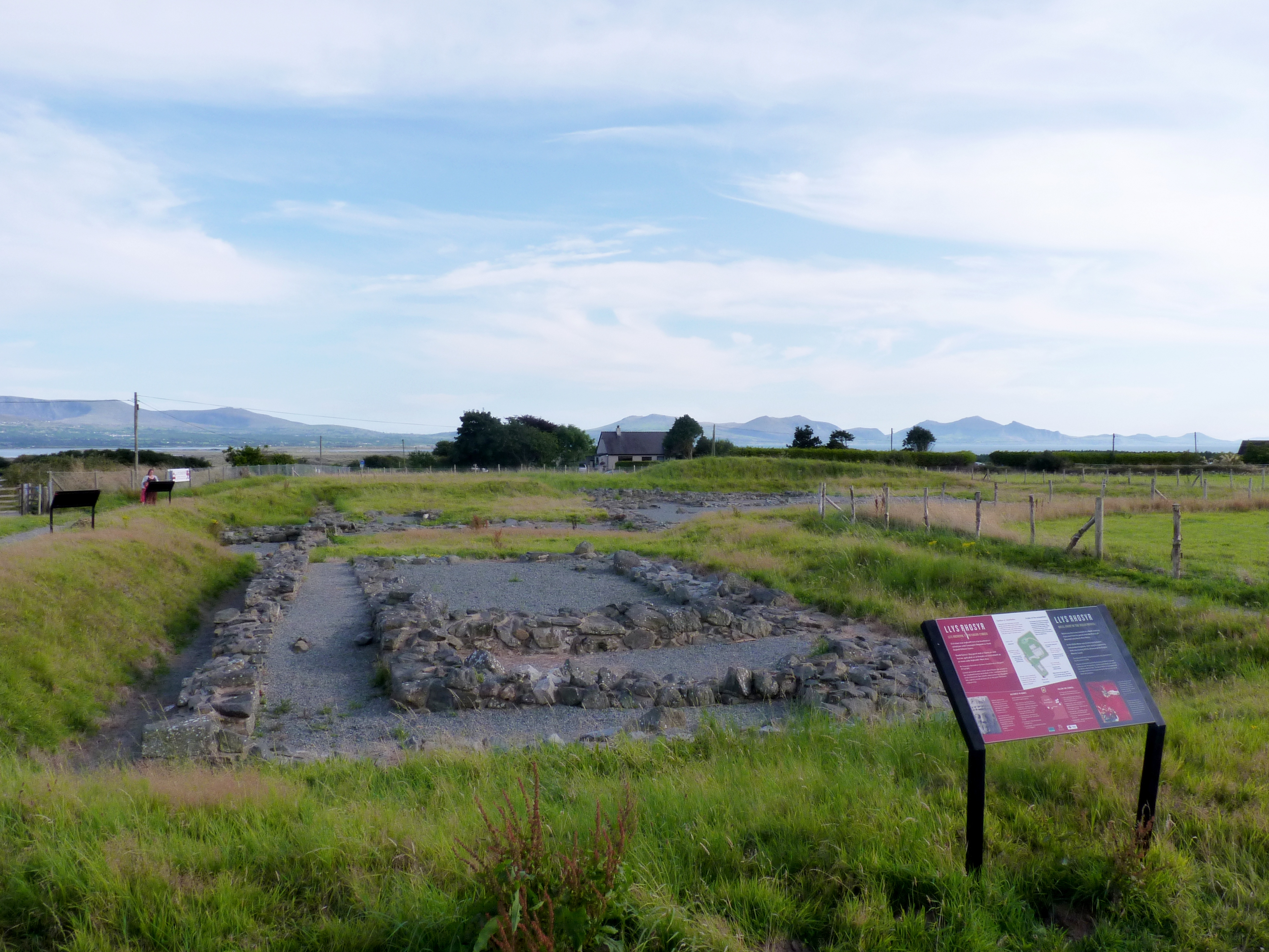
- Great hall of Llys Rhosyr

- Location within Anglesey
- Principal area: Isle of Anglesey
- Country: Wales
- Sovereign state: United Kingdom
- Police: North Wales
- Fire: North Wales
- Ambulance: Welsh
- List of places UK Wales Anglesey Map of the community

Rhosyr is a community in the far southern corner of Anglesey, Wales. It includes the villages of Dwyran and Newborough, Llangeinwen and Llangaffo.

The community population taken at the 2011 census was 2,226. and includes Llanddwyn Island and Newborough Forest.

== Llys Rhosyr ==
Rhosyr was the site of one of the courts of the 13th-century Welsh prince Llywelyn ab Iorwerth (Llywelyn the Great). Llys Rhosyr ('Rhosyr Court') is now an important archaeological site, located close to Newborough. It was rediscovered and partially excavated in 1992, with local activists currently (2017) seeking funding to uncover the remaining two thirds.

== Governance ==
Rhosyr elects a community council of fifteen councillors who, amongst other things, are responsible for maintenance of local footpaths and cemeteries. Until the 2012 Isle of Anglesey electoral boundary changes Rhosyr was also an electoral ward for the Isle of Anglesey County Council. However, since the 2013 local elections it has combined with neighbouring communities, Aberffraw and Bodorgan to form a larger ward, Bro Aberffraw, which elects two county councillors.
