= Pencarnisiog =

Coordinates: 53.233816°N 4.469953°W

- Location within Anglesey
- OS grid reference: SH 3524 7360
  - Cardiff: 132.9 mi (213.9 km)
  - London: 218.5 mi (351.6 km)
- Community: Llanfaelog
- Principal area: Anglesey
- Country: Wales
- Sovereign state: United Kingdom
- Post town: Tŷ Croes
- Police: North Wales
- Fire: North Wales
- Ambulance: Welsh
- UK Parliament: Ynys Môn
- Senedd Cymru – Welsh Parliament: Ynys Môn

Pencarnisiog is a village in the community of Llanfaelog, Anglesey, Wales, which is 132.9 miles (213.8 km) from Cardiff and 218.5 miles (351.6 km) from London.

The name "Pencarnisiog" translates to, "the head/top of the lower cairn". There is a Welsh-medium primary school, Ysgol Gynradd Pencarnisiog, in the village, founded in 1911. As of January 2018, the school had the second highest percentage of pupils (aged 5 and over) who spoke Welsh at home in Wales, at 95.6%. In 2024, 89.8 per cent of pupils spoke Welsh at home.

On 23 September 2026, an Royal Air Force Hawk T2 jet crashed in the village, shortly after taking off from nearby RAF Valley. Both pilots ejected before the crash, with no casualties on the ground.

== See also ==
- List of localities in Wales by population
