= Llanddaniel Fab =

Village and community in Anglesey, Wales

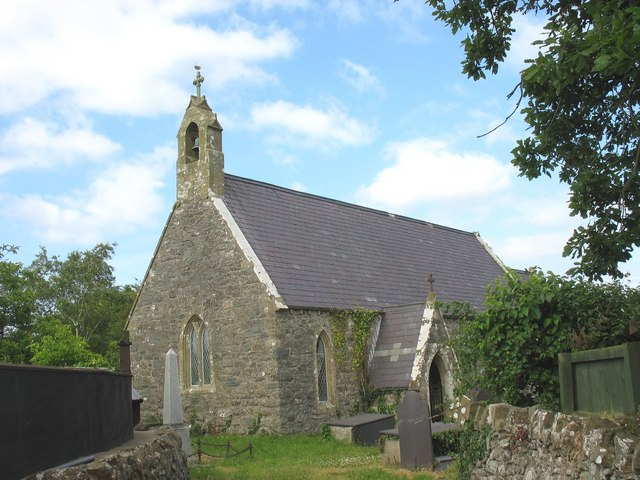
- Saint Deiniol's Church

- Location within Anglesey
- Population: 776 (2011)
- OS grid reference: SH4970
- Community: Llanddaniel Fab
- Principal area: Anglesey
- Preserved county: Gwynedd
- Country: Wales
- Sovereign state: United Kingdom
- Post town: GAERWEN
- Postcode district: LL60
- Dialling code: 01248
- Police: North Wales
- Fire: North Wales
- Ambulance: Welsh
- UK Parliament: Ynys Môn
- Senedd Cymru – Welsh Parliament: Bangor Conwy Môn
- List of places UK Wales Anglesey 53.210°N 4.253°W Map of the community

Llanddaniel Fab (or Llanddaniel-fab; formerly Llanddeiniol-fab) is a village and community in the south of Anglesey, Wales. At the 2001 census it had a population of 699, increasing to 776 at the 2011 census. The village has its own community council. Amenities include a primary school (Ysgol Parc y Bont). The village is on National Cycle Route 8 (Lôn Las Cymru).

== Geology ==
It stands at the highest point of a low ridge running SW/NE: this is one of a series of Precambrian rock units oriented in that direction.

== Prehistory, Roman conquest ==
The village is near the prehistoric monument of Bryn Celli Ddu (Black Grove Hill) which was constructed in the Late Neolithic period. There was an Iron Age settlement between Bryn Celli Ddu and Llanddaniel Fab, on a ritual landscape of more ancient Neolithic and Bronze Age tombs. Its excavator speculates that the Iron Age inhabitants may have taken advantage of the ancient messages from the dead that were imparted to the druids through their dreams; the village may have been a sacred grove of the Druids and a target of the first Roman invasion of Anglesey.

== Modern history ==
In the east of the community, by the Menai Strait, stands the country seat of the Marquess of Anglesey, Plas Newydd, parts of which date from the 14th century. The house has been owned by the National Trust since 1976.

In the 16th century the Welsh poet Catrin ferch Gruffudd ap Hywel lived here. Her poems are preserved, including an awdl with a religious theme written in 1555.

During the 2001 United Kingdom foot-and-mouth crisis, many sheep and cattle were slaughtered in the area.

The village was struck by an F1/T2 tornado on 23 November 1981, part of the record-breaking nationwide tornado outbreak on that day.

== Church ==
St Deiniol's Church is a small 19th-century church in the village. The first church in this location is said to have been established by St Deiniol Fab (to whom the church is dedicated) in 616. The current building incorporates some material and fittings from its predecessor, which probably dated from about the 16th century. The church is no longer in use, and the village is now served by a church in Llanfairpwllgwyngyll. It is a Grade II listed building, a designation given to "buildings of special interest, which warrant every effort being made to preserve them", in particular because it is regarded as "a good example of a simple 19th-century rural church".
