= Talwrn =

Village in Anglesey, Wales

Coordinates: 53.2694°N 4.2739°W

Talwrn is a small village between the county town of Llangefni and Pentraeth on the Isle of Anglesey, north Wales. Talwrn is most notable for the Grade II-listed 16th-century manor house of Plas Llanddyfnan, which lies just to the north of the hamlet. Plas Llanddyfnan is a Queen Anne manor house from the early 18th century. Plas Llanddyfnan was owned by seven generations of the Griffiths family.

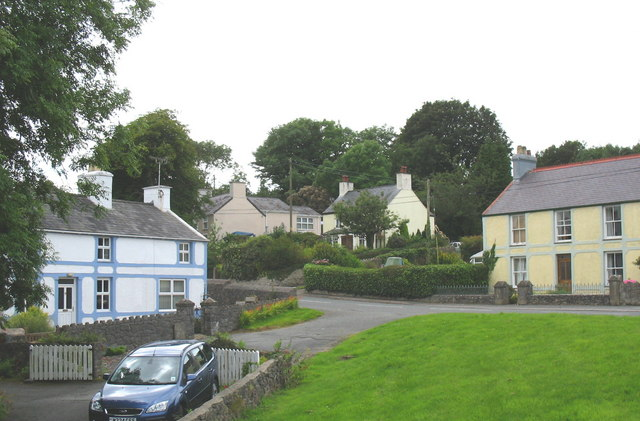
Talwrn in August 2007

To the west and south of Talwrn are a number of unimproved fields which have been designated as a site of special scientific interest because of the botanical assemblage supported on the neutral grassland and mire.
