= Llanfair-yn-Neubwll =

Village and community in Anglesey, Wales

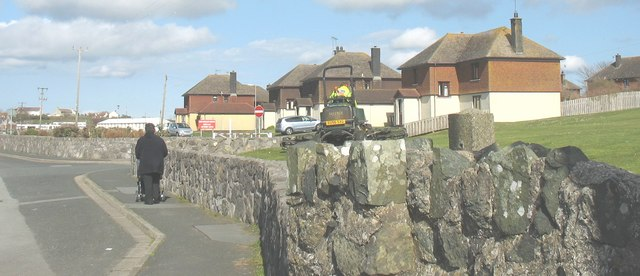
- RAF Valley

- Location within Anglesey
- Population: 1,874 (2011)
- OS grid reference: SH302765
- Community: Llanfair-yn-Neubwll
- Principal area: Anglesey
- Preserved county: Gwynedd
- Country: Wales
- Sovereign state: United Kingdom
- Post town: HOLYHEAD
- Postcode district: LL65
- Dialling code: 01407
- Police: North Wales
- Fire: North Wales
- Ambulance: Welsh
- UK Parliament: Ynys Môn
- Senedd Cymru – Welsh Parliament: Bangor Conwy Môn
- List of places UK Wales Anglesey 53.258886°N 4.546176°W Map of the community

Llanfair-yn-Neubwll is a village and community on the Isle of Anglesey in the north west of Wales. The community includes the villages of Llanfihangel yn Nhowyn and Caergeiliog, and had a population of 1,688, increasing to 1,874 at the 2011 census. The community is heavily connected to the nearby Royal Air Force airfield, RAF Valley, established on Tywyn Trewan during the Second World War, and still in use. Due to the airfield, Llanfair-yn-Neubwll is one of the most anglicised of the communities on Anglesey.

Llanfair-yn-Neubwll lies on the western coast of Anglesey, looking out towards Holy Island. Notable geographic features of the area include the offshore rocks of Ynys Feirig and the eight lakes known as Ardal y Llynnoedd ("Lake District"). Many of the lakes are included in the Valley Wetlands RSPB reserve. The community is served by the nearby railway station at Valley on the North Wales Coast Line. This provides connections to Holyhead, Wrexham, Chester, Crewe and Birmingham.

== Governance ==
An electoral ward of the same name exists. This ward includes the community of Bodedern with a total population taken at the 2011 election of 2925.
