= Llanddeusant, Anglesey =

Linear village in Anglesey, Wales

Coordinates: 53.340438°N 4.487293°W

Llanddeusant
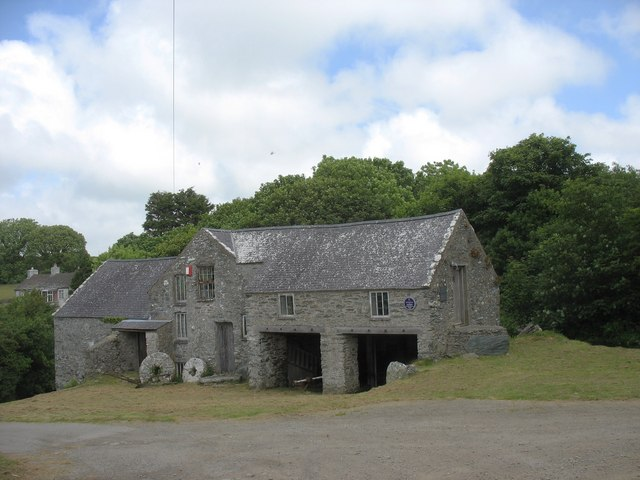

- Location within Anglesey
- OS grid reference: SH345855
- Community: Tref Alaw
- Principal area: Anglesey
- Preserved county: Gwynedd
- Country: Wales
- Sovereign state: United Kingdom
- Postcode district: LL65 4
- Dialling code: 01407 730
- Police: North Wales
- Fire: North Wales
- Ambulance: Welsh
- UK Parliament: Ynys Môn
- Senedd Cymru – Welsh Parliament: Bangor Conwy Môn

Llanddeusant (Welsh for 'the church of two saints'; Welsh pronunciation) is a small linear village, on Anglesey, North Wales about 10 miles (16 km) north east of Holyhead.

Until 1984, Llanddeusant was also a community.

== Community ==
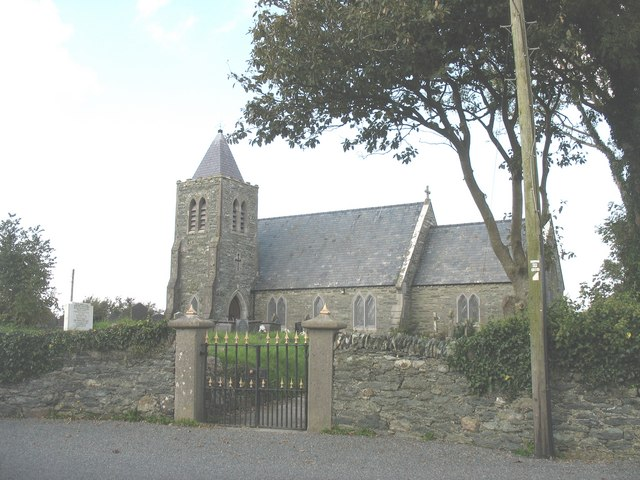
Saints Marcellus and Marcellinus's Church, Llandeusant, Anglesey.

The village takes its name from its parish church which is dedicated to the 2 Saints, St. Marcellus and Saint Marcellina. The church has medieval origins from the 12th century. It was wholly rebuilt in 1868 by a local Welsh architect, Goronwy Roberts.

Llanddeusant is claimed to be the burial place of Branwen (Mabinogion). A cairn was discovered nearby and is now named 'Bedd Branwen' in Welsh. Branwen's grave is at the river (afon) Alaw.

=== Llynnon windmill ===
At Llanddeusant is Anglesey's and Wales' only working windmill, Llynnon Mill, opened in 1775 at a cost of £550 and renovated by the local council in 1986 and opened to the public. The mill was originally located there as it lies just to the north of the Afon Alaw, and a little west of Llyn Alaw. It also has the area's last working water mill, Melin Hywel.

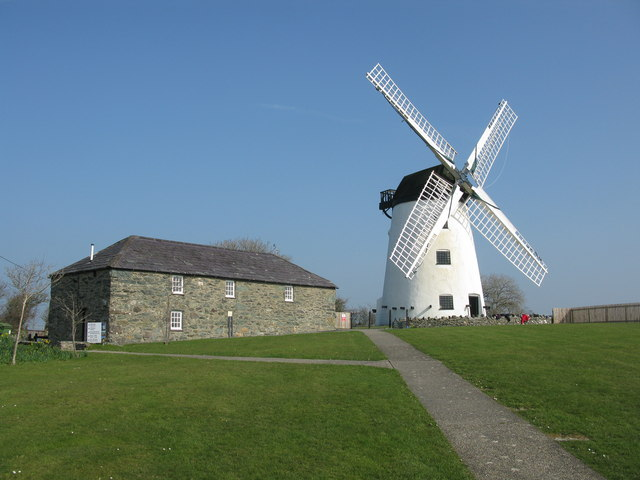
Llynnon Mill, Llanddeusant

=== School ===
The co-educational village primary school, Ysgol Gynradd Llanddeusant closed in July 2011 after serving the village for 160 years. On 2 October 2013, the Isle of Anglesey Council planning committee granted permission for the council to demolish the school and build 8 houses.

=== Notable people ===
- Robert ap Huw (ca.1580 – 1665), a Welsh harpist, music copyist and gentleman farmer; grew up here
- Arthur Bulkeley, Bishop of Bangor 1541–1553.
