= Pentraeth railway station =

Disused railway station in Anglesey, Wales

Pentraeth

General information
- Location: Pentraeth, Anglesey; Wales
- Coordinates: 53.2810°N 4.2238°W
- Grid reference: SH518783
- Platforms: 1

Other information
- Status: Disused

History
- Original company: London and North Western Railway
- Pre-grouping: London and North Western Railway
- Post-grouping: London Midland and Scottish Railway

Key dates
- 1 July 1908: Opened
- 22 September 1930: Closed
Location

Pentraeth railway station was situated on the Red Wharf Bay branch line between Holland Arms railway station and Benllech, the third station after the line branched from the main Anglesey Central Railway. Opening on 1 July 1908, a quarter of a mile out of the village it was one of the two largest stations on the line. On the Up (east) side of the line stood the 120 ft (37 m) platform with several associated huts. Unlike the previous two stations Ceint and Rhyd-y-Saint this was staffed, albeit by a maximum of two people at any one time. There was also a small goods yard just south of the platform. It was also the nearest station for the town of Beaumaris.

The station closed in 1930, the line closed completely in 1950 the track was removed in 1953 and the station building removed. There is no evidence of the station or goods yard left as the site has houses built upon it.

Preceding station	Historical railways	Following station
Rhyd-y-Saint	Red Wharf Bay Branch	Llanbedrgoch
