= Beaumaris =

Town and community on the Isle of Anglesey, Wales

Beaumaris: Welsh: Biwmares
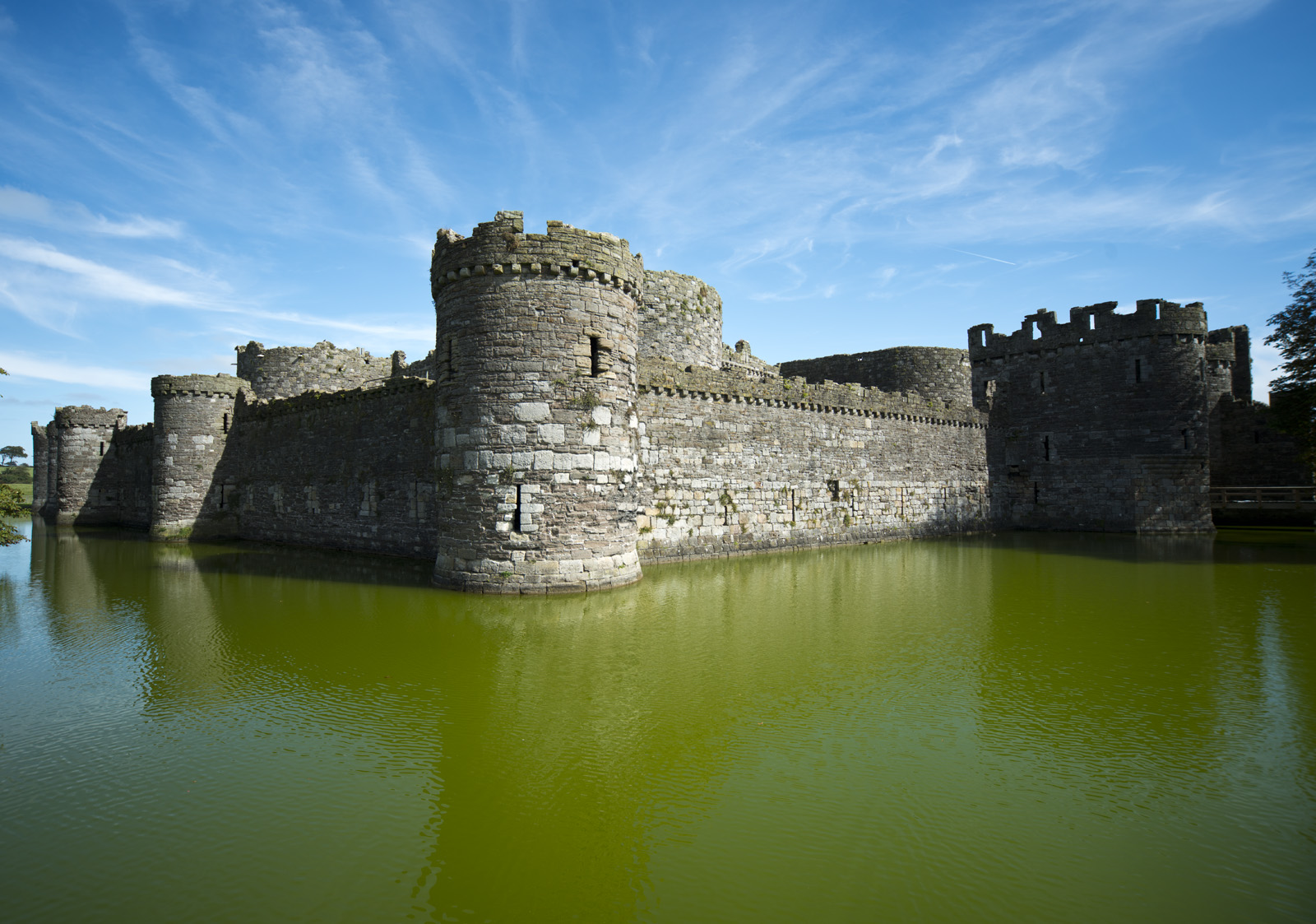
- Beaumaris Castle

- Location within Anglesey
- Population: 1,121 (2021)
- OS grid reference: SH6076
- Community: Beaumaris
- Principal area: Isle of Anglesey
- Preserved county: Gwynedd
- Country: Wales
- Sovereign state: United Kingdom
- Post town: BEAUMARIS
- Postcode district: LL58
- Dialling code: 01248
- Police: North Wales
- Fire: North Wales
- Ambulance: Welsh
- UK Parliament: Ynys Môn
- Senedd Cymru – Welsh Parliament: Bangor Conwy Môn
- List of places UK Wales Anglesey 53.267°N 4.093°W Map of the community

Beaumaris (/boʊˈmærɪs, bjuː-/; Welsh: Biwmares Welsh pronunciation: [bɪuˈmaːrɛs]) is a town and community on the Isle of Anglesey in Wales, of which it is the former county town. It is located at the eastern entrance to the Menai Strait, the tidal waterway separating Anglesey from the coast of North Wales. At the 2021 census, its population was 1,121. The community includes Llanfaes.

== History ==
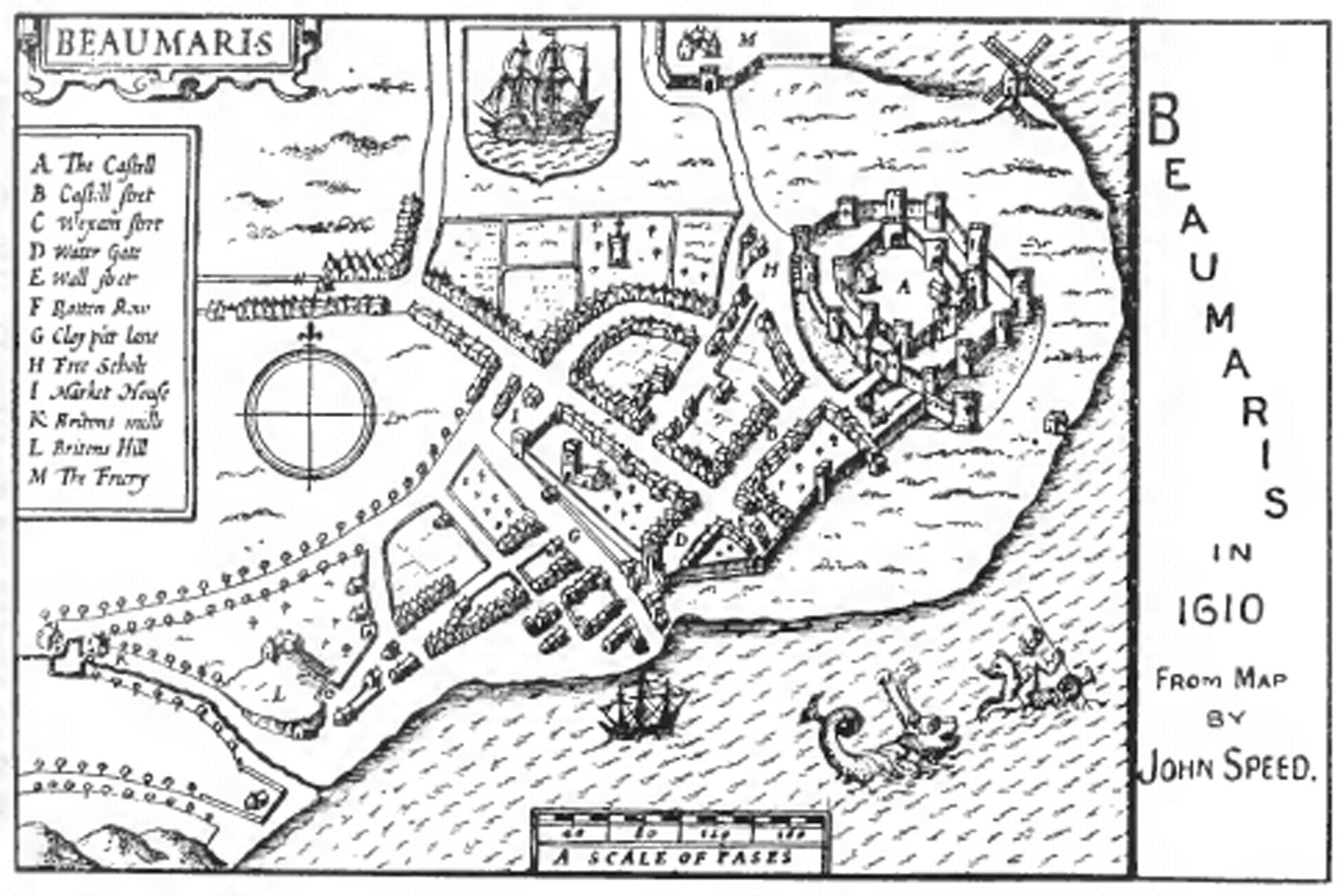
Beaumaris in 1610

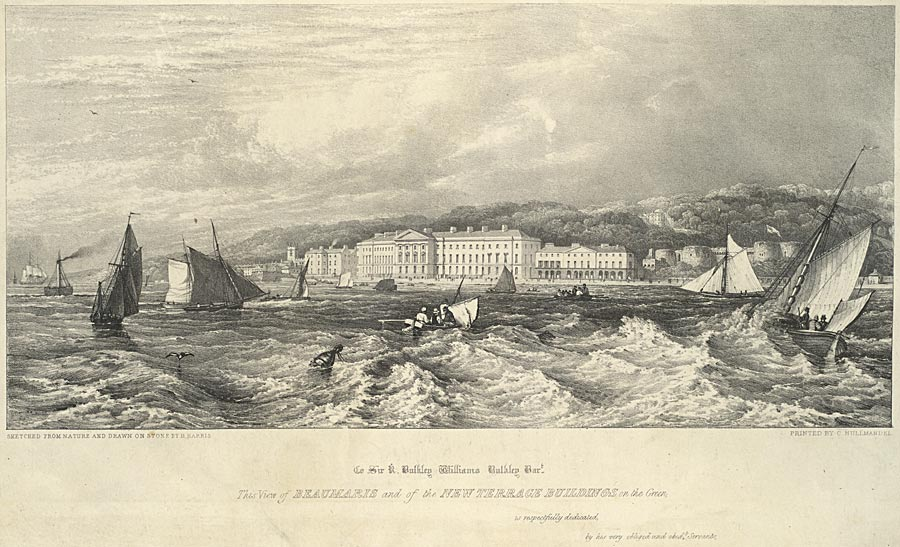
Beaumaris from the sea in the 1840s

Beaumaris was originally a Viking settlement known as Porth y Wygyr ("Port of the Vikings"), but the town itself began its development in 1295 when Edward I of England, having conquered Wales, commissioned the building of Beaumaris Castle as part of a chain of fortifications around the North Wales coast (others include Conwy, Caernarfon and Harlech).

The castle was built on a marsh, and that is where it found its name; the Norman-French builders called it beaux marais, which translates as "fair marsh".

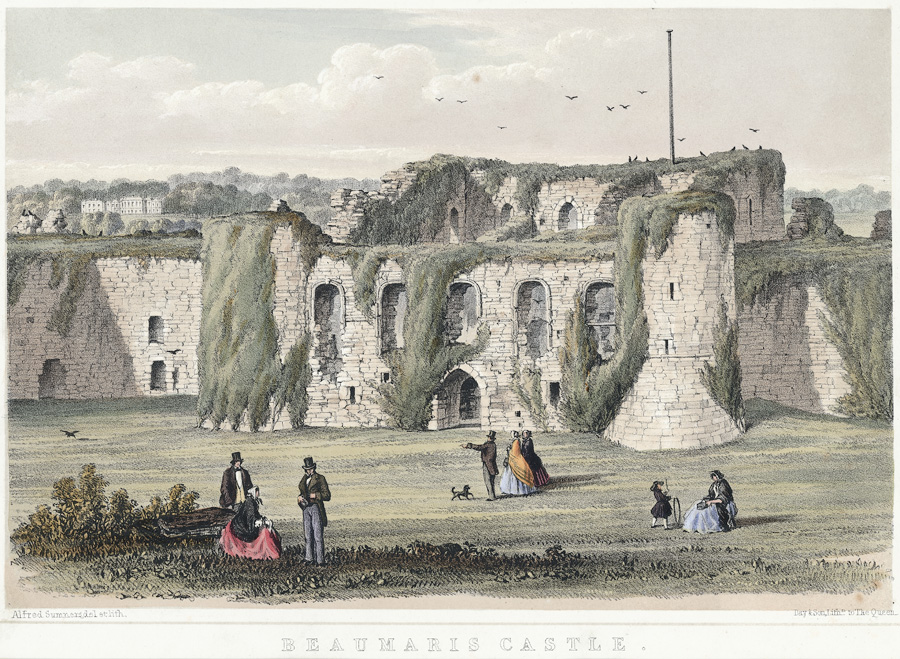
The castle in 1852

The ancient village of Llanfaes, one mile (1.5 kilometres) to the north of Beaumaris, had been occupied by Anglo-Saxons in 818 but had been regained by Merfyn Frych, King of Gwynedd, and remained a vital strategic settlement. To counter further Welsh uprisings and to ensure control of the Menai Strait, Edward I chose the flat coastal plain as the place to build Beaumaris Castle. The castle was designed by the Savoyard mason Master James of Saint George and is considered the most perfect example of a concentric castle. The 'troublesome' residents of Llanfaes were removed en bloc to Rhosyr in the west of Anglesey, a new settlement King Edward entitled "Newborough".

Beaumaris was awarded a royal charter by Edward I in 1296, which was drawn up on similar terms to the charters of his other castle towns in North Wales and intended to invest only the English and Norman-French residents with civic rights. Native Welsh residents of Beaumaris were largely disqualified from holding any civic office, carrying any weapon, and holding assemblies; and were not allowed to buy houses or land within the borough. The charter also specifically prohibited Jews (who had been largely expelled from most English towns) from living in Beaumaris.

From 1562 until the Reform Act 1832, the Beaumaris constituency was a rotten borough with the member of parliament elected by the corporation of the town, which was in the control of the Bulkeley family.

Beaumaris was the port of registration for all vessels in North West Wales, covering every harbour on Anglesey and all the ports from Conwy to Pwllheli. Shipbuilding was a major industry in Beaumaris. This was centred on Gallows Point – a nearby spit of land extending into the Menai Strait about one mile (1.5 kilometres) west of the town. Gallows Point had originally been called "Osmund's Eyre" but was renamed when the town gallows was erected there – along with a "Dead House" for the corpses of criminals dispatched in public executions. Later, hangings were carried out at the town jail and the bodies buried in a lime-pit within the curtilage of the jail. One of the last prisoners to hang at Beaumaris issued a curse before he died – decreeing that if he was innocent the four faces of the church clock would never show the same time.

Beaumaris was a haven of refuge in a storm to the passengers of the sailing ship, Everton, on a Thursday morning in November,1762 when it ran aground on a nearby sand bank. The ship's Captain, knowing nothing could be done before high tide six hours hence, ordered the yawl to be lowered carrying himself and all the passengers to shore for fresh provisions in the town. One of those passengers was Devereux Jarratt from Virginia who was voyaging to London to receive holy orders from the Bishop of London in the Church of England. He writes in his autobiography, "As I had eaten nothing for several days, but salt beef, ranced butter, black biscuit, &tc. while on board, the meat, butter, and every thing I ate, at Beaumaris, exceeded any thing I ever had tasted in all my life. Having refreshed ourselves, in the most delicious and agreeable manner, we took a view of the town, and the remains of an old castle standing just without the town, which had been erected as a place of security and defence, by one of the first kings of England. Every thing appeared so delightful, and the inhabitants looked so fresh and ruddy, that I thought no people in the world could live better than the Welsh. The high mountain of Penmanmaur, lying over against the town, with the top in the clouds, and all the visible parts covered with snow, exhibited the most grand and majestic appearance, I had ever seen."

According to historian Hywel Teifi Edwards, when the "Provincial Eisteddfod" was held at Beaumaris in 1832, a young Princess Victoria and her mother were in attendance.

Beaumaris has never had a railway station built to the town, although the nearby village of Pentraeth had a station on the former Red Wharf Bay branch line which ran off the Anglesey Central Railway. It was roughly six miles (ten kilometres) west of the town by road. This station closed in 1930.

== Governance ==
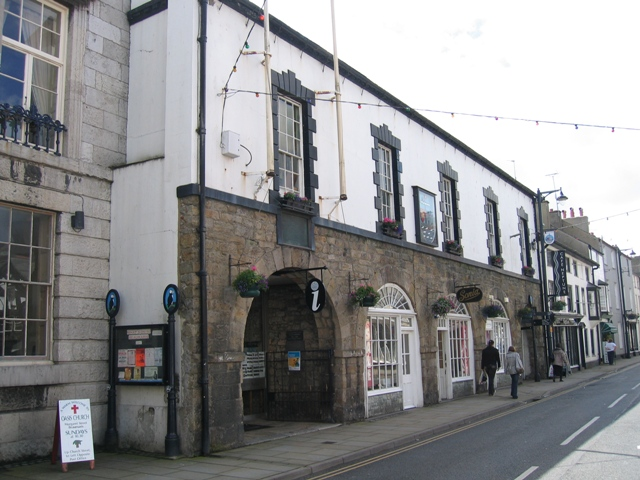
Beaumaris Town Hall

There are two tiers of local government covering Beaumaris, at community (town) and county level: Beaumaris Town Council and Isle of Anglesey County Council. The town council is based at Beaumaris Town Hall on Castle Street.

=== Administrative history ===
Beaumaris was an ancient borough. It was awarded its first charter in 1296. In 1836 it became a municipal borough under the Municipal Corporations Act 1835, which standardised how most boroughs operated across Wales and England. The borough was abolished in 1974, with its area instead becoming a community. District-level functions passed to Ynys Môn-Isle of Anglesey Borough Council, which in 1996 was reconstituted as a county council.

== Architecture ==
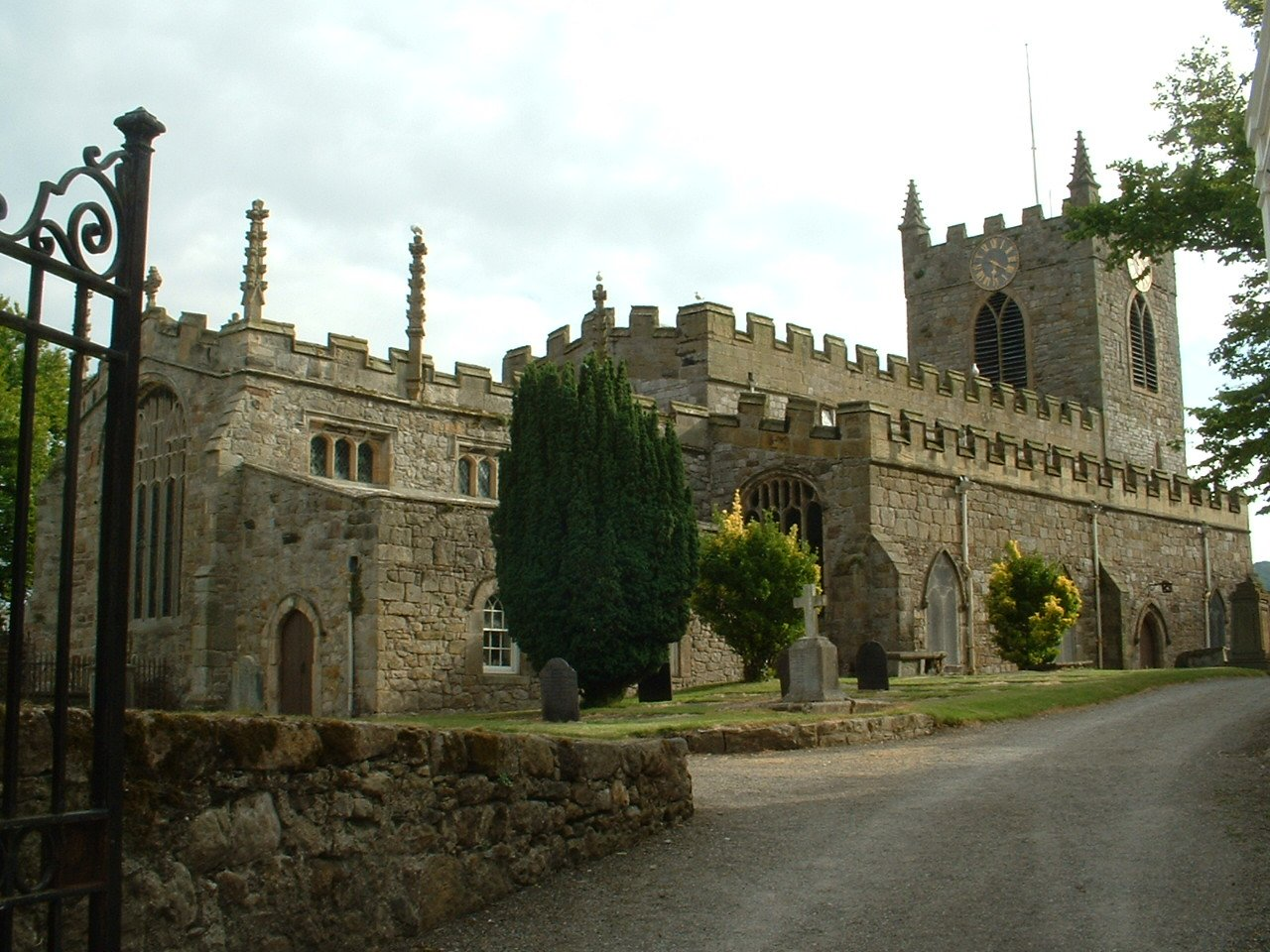
St Mary's and St Nicholas's Church

Notable buildings in the town include the castle, a courthouse built in 1614, the 14th-century St Mary's and St Nicholas's Church, Beaumaris Gaol, the 14th-century Tudor Rose (one of the oldest original timber-framed buildings in Britain) and the Bulls Head Inn, built in 1472, which General Thomas Mytton made his headquarters during the "Siege of Beaumaris" during the second English Civil War in 1648.

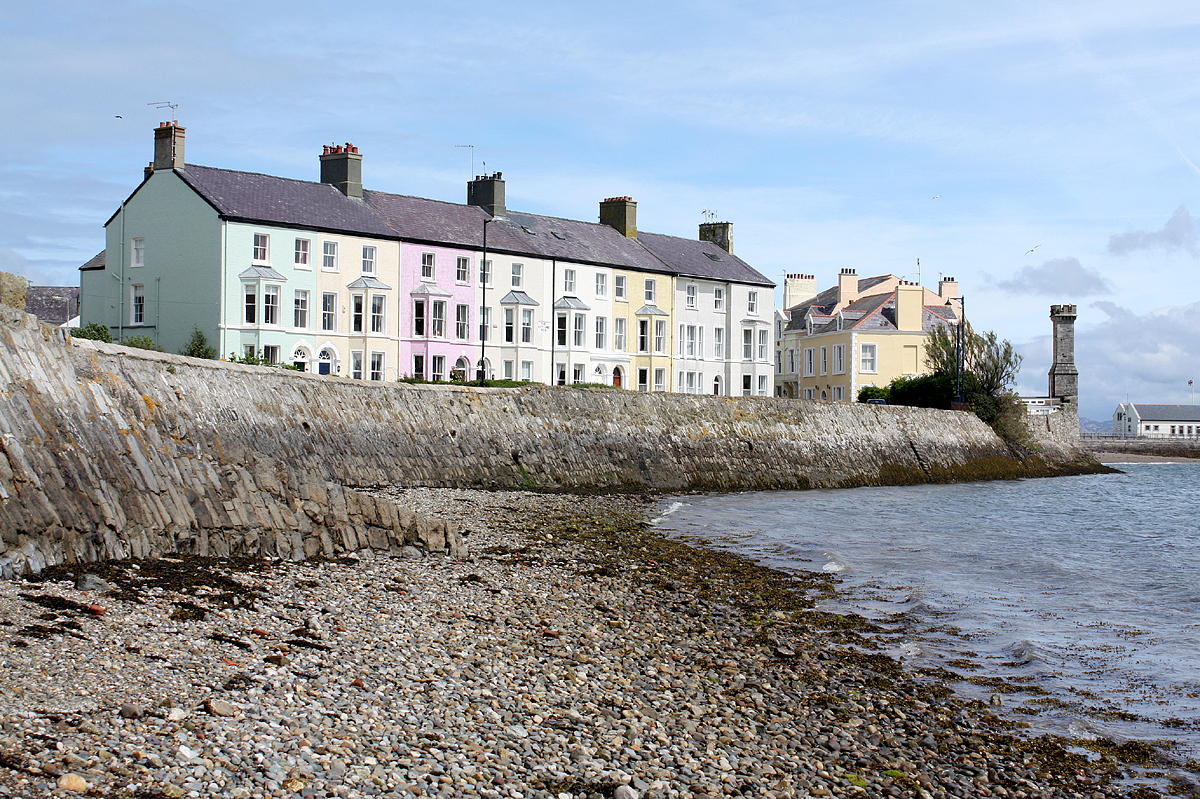
Houses on the foreshore

A native of Anglesey, David Hughes, founded Beaumaris Grammar School in 1603. It became a non-selective school in 1952 when Anglesey County Council became the first authority in Britain to adopt comprehensive secondary education. The school was eventually moved to Menai Bridge and only the ancient hall of the original school building now remains. Beaumaris Town Hall was completed in 1785.

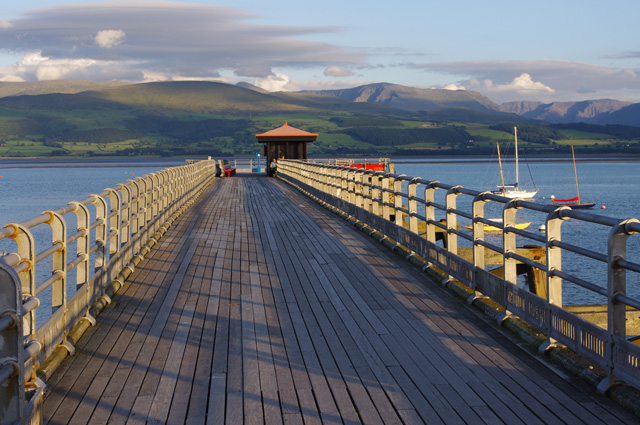
Beaumaris Pier

Beaumaris Pier, opened in 1846, was designed by Frederick Foster and is a masonry jetty on wooden and concrete pilings. The pier was rebuilt and extended to 570 feet (170 m) after storm damage in 1872, and a large pavilion containing a cafe was built at the end. It was once the landing stage for steamships of the Liverpool and North Wales Shipping Company, including the Snowdon, La Marguerite, St. Elvies and St. Trillo, although the larger vessels in its fleet – the St. Seriol and St. Tudno – were too large for the pier and landed their passengers at Menai Bridge. In the 1960s, through lack of maintenance, the pier became unsafe and was threatened with demolition, but local yachtswoman and lifeboat secretary Mary Burton made a large private donation to ensure the pier was saved for the town. A further reconstruction was carried out between 2010 and 2012.

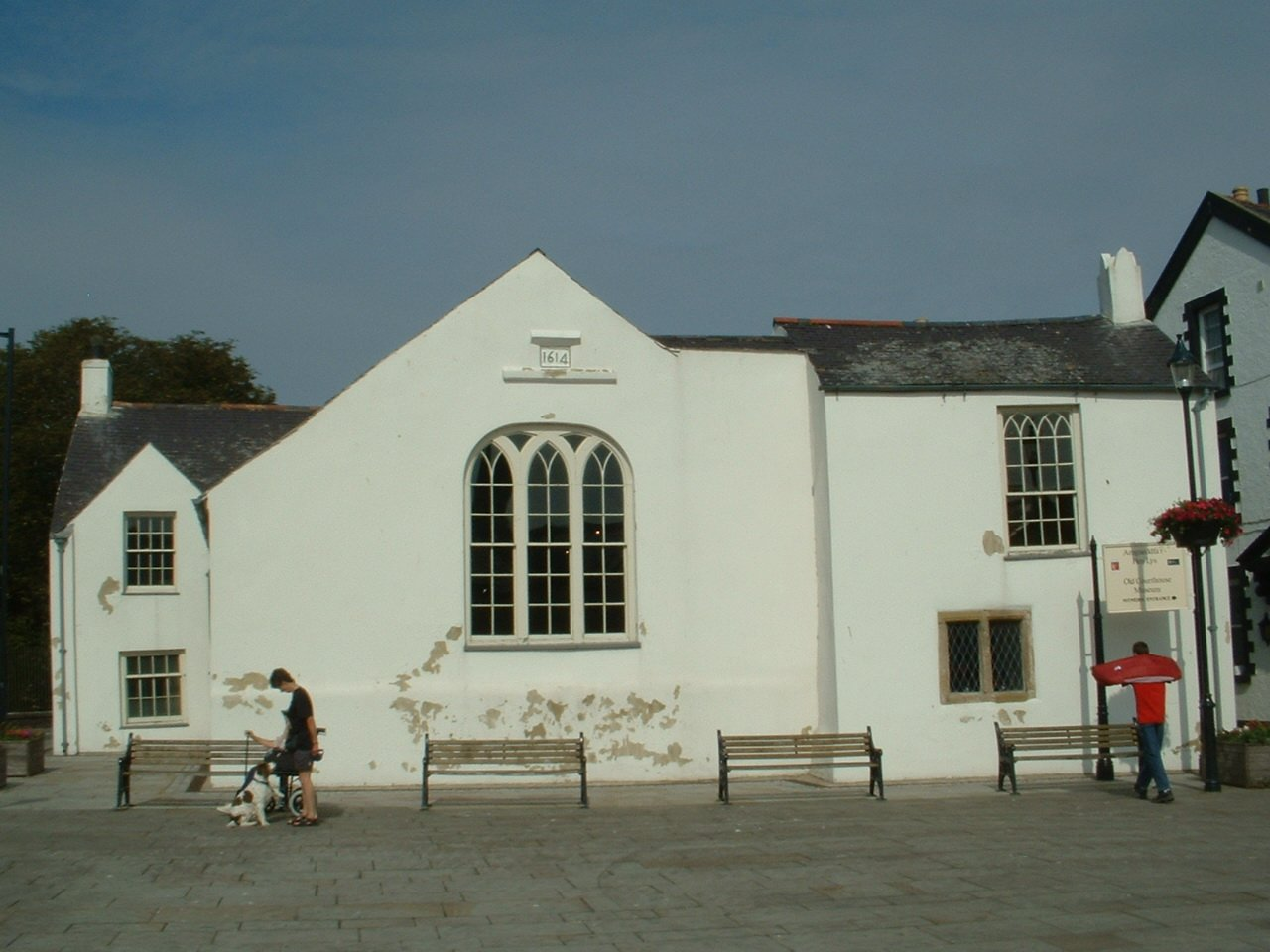
The Old Courthouse

The Saunders Roe company set up a factory at Fryars (the site of the old Franciscan friary to the east) when it was feared that the company's main base on the Isle of Wight would be a target for World War II Luftwaffe bombers. The factory converted American-built PBY Catalina flying boats. After the war, the company focused on their ship building produced at the site with fast patrol boats, minesweepers and an experimental Austin Float Plane. They also produced buses for London Transport (RT Double deckers) and single deck buses for Cuba.

== Lifeboat ==
The first recorded rescue of people in difficulty at sea was in 1830 when 375 people were rescued from a foundered emigrant ship. A lifeboat station was established in 1891 and closed four years later when a neighbouring station was provided with a more powerful lifeboat. The station was reopened in 1914 and is operated by the RNLI.

== Education ==
Beaumaris is served by one primary school. Its 300-year-old grammar school moved to nearby Menai Bridge in 1963 and became the comprehensive Ysgol David Hughes.

== Transport ==
The town is served by regular buses connecting it to Bangor, Benllech, Llangefni, Llangoed, Menai Bridge and Red Wharf Bay. Buses are operated by both Arriva Buses Wales and Gwynfor Coaches.

The nearest active railway stations to the town are both Llanfairpwll and Bangor. Despite never having its own railway station, the town was once served by the Red Wharf Bay branch line. The nearest station on that line was located in Pentraeth, which opened in 1908 but closed in 1930. The line then closed in 1956.

== Demographics ==
=== Languages ===
According to the United Kingdom Census 2021, 36.8 per cent of Beaumaris residents can speak Welsh. 56.3 per cent of the population said that they could speak, read, write or understand Welsh.

The 2011 census found that 39.5 per cent of residents could speak Welsh. The 2011 census also found that 58.7 per cent of Welsh-born residents could speak Welsh. In 2001, 39.7 per cent of the population could speak Welsh. In 1981, 39.9 per cent could do so; 10 people were monoglot Welsh speakers.

== Events ==
The Beaumaris Food Festival is an annual food festival that has been held since 2013 in the town and castle grounds.

== Notable residents ==
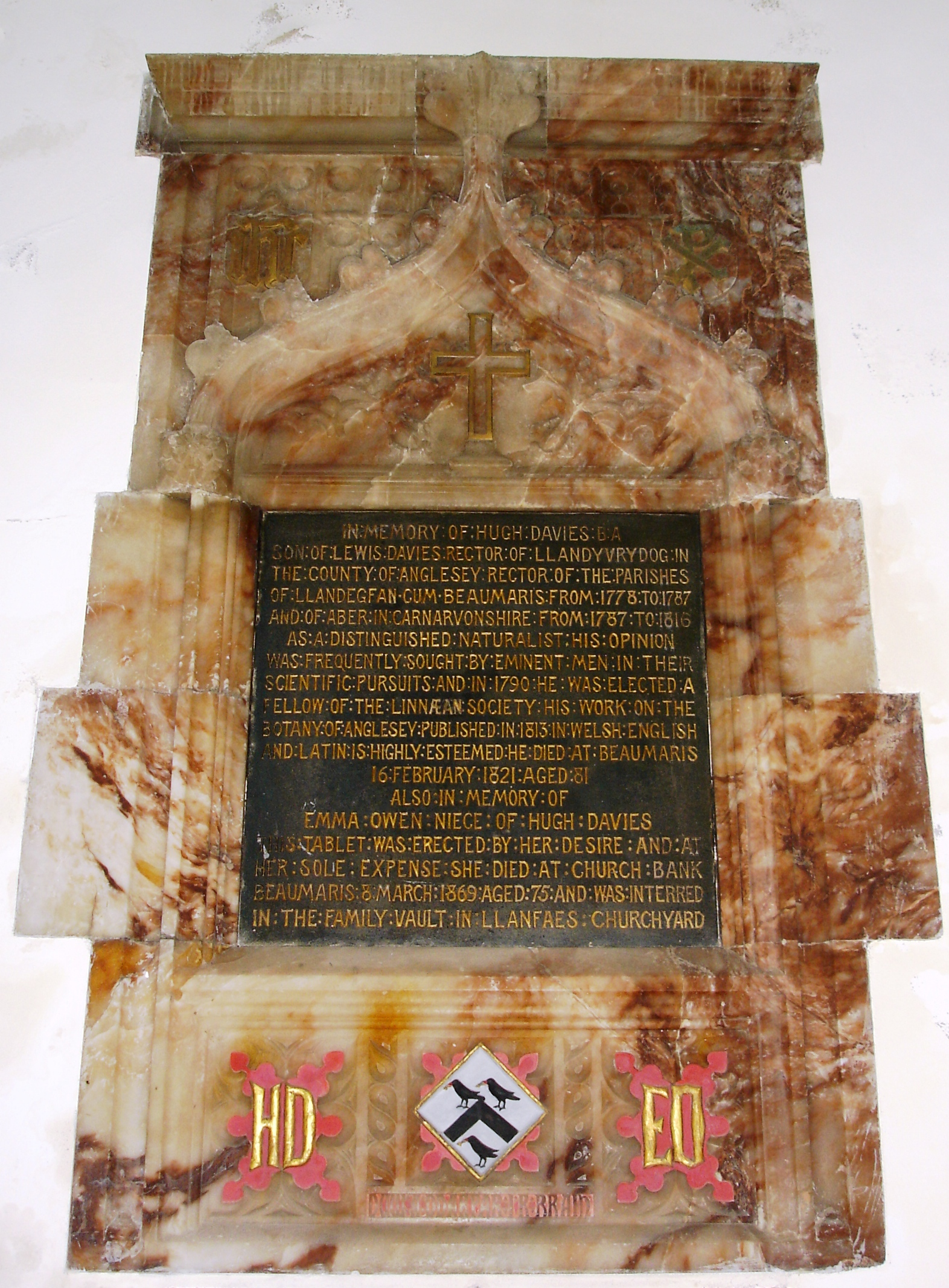
Memorial to Hugh Davies in St Mary's Church, Beaumaris

- Sir Richard Bulkeley (1533–1621), politician and courtier of Elizabeth I, ex officio mayor (1561–1562) and mayor (1562–1563).
- Catherine Davies (1773 – after 1841), governess to the children of the King and Queen of Naples and autobiographer.
- Hugh Davies (1739–1821) botanist and Anglican clergyman, became rector of Llandegfan with Beaumaris in 1778.
- Charles Allen Duval (1810–1872), portrait painter, photographer, illustrator and writer.
- Wayne Hennessey (born 1987), Welsh international footballer, approaching 300 club caps and 106 for Wales.
- Hendrik Lek (1903–1985) painter and antique dealer, born in Antwerp, Belgium; lived in retirement in Anglesey.
- Richard Llwyd (1752–1835), author, poet and genealogist.
- Reginald Wynn Owen (1876–1950) architect, worked for the London and North Western Railway.
- Neil Sloane (born 1939), mathematician noted for compiling integer sequences.

== Namesakes ==
- Beaumaris, the suburb of Melbourne, Victoria, Australia, and the small seaside town of Beaumaris in Tasmania, were both named after the town.
- Beaumaris, the neighbourhood in Edmonton, Alberta, Canada, was named after the castle, as was the village of Beaumaris in Muskoka, Ontario.

== In popular culture ==
In 2018, Netflix used Beaumaris as the fictional seaside town (and in particular the pier) for the series Free Rein.

== See also ==
- Beaumaris town walls
