= Llanbedrgoch railway station =

Disused railway station in Anglesey, Wales

Llanbedrgoch
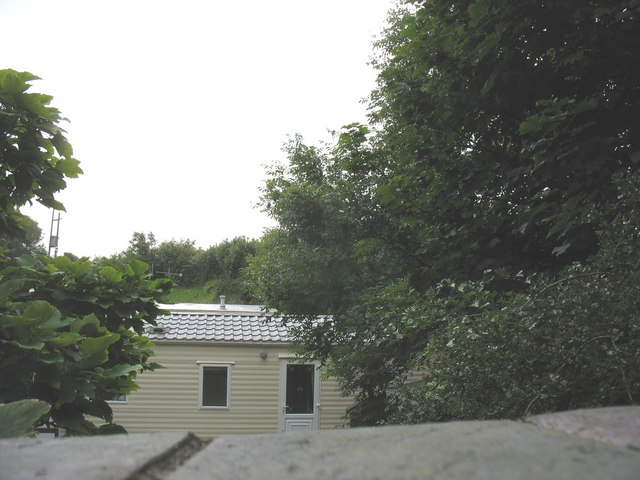
- The site of the station in 2008

General information
- Location: Llanbedrgoch, Anglesey; Wales
- Coordinates: 53.3004°N 4.2227°W
- Grid reference: SH519804
- Platforms: 1

Other information
- Status: Disused

History
- Original company: London and North Western Railway
- Pre-grouping: London and North Western Railway
- Post-grouping: London Midland and Scottish Railway

Key dates
- 24 May 1909: Opened
- 22 September 1930: Closed
Location

Llanbedrgoch railway station was situated on the Red Wharf Bay branch line between Holland Arms railway station and Benllech, the penultimate station on the line off the main Anglesey Central Railway in Wales. Opening in 1909, it was a very simple station with only one short platform on the Up (east) side and a wooden waiting hut. It was an unstaffed request stop with no goods yard or sidings.

The station closed in 1930, as did the line itself for passenger trains, and the station building removed. The tracks themselves were taken up in 1953 and the location of the platform is now a caravan site.

Preceding station	Historical railways	Following station
Pentraeth	Red Wharf Bay Branch	Red Wharf Bay and Benllech
