= St Michael's Church, Llanfihangel Ysgeifiog =

Coordinates: 53.235914°N 4.280937°W

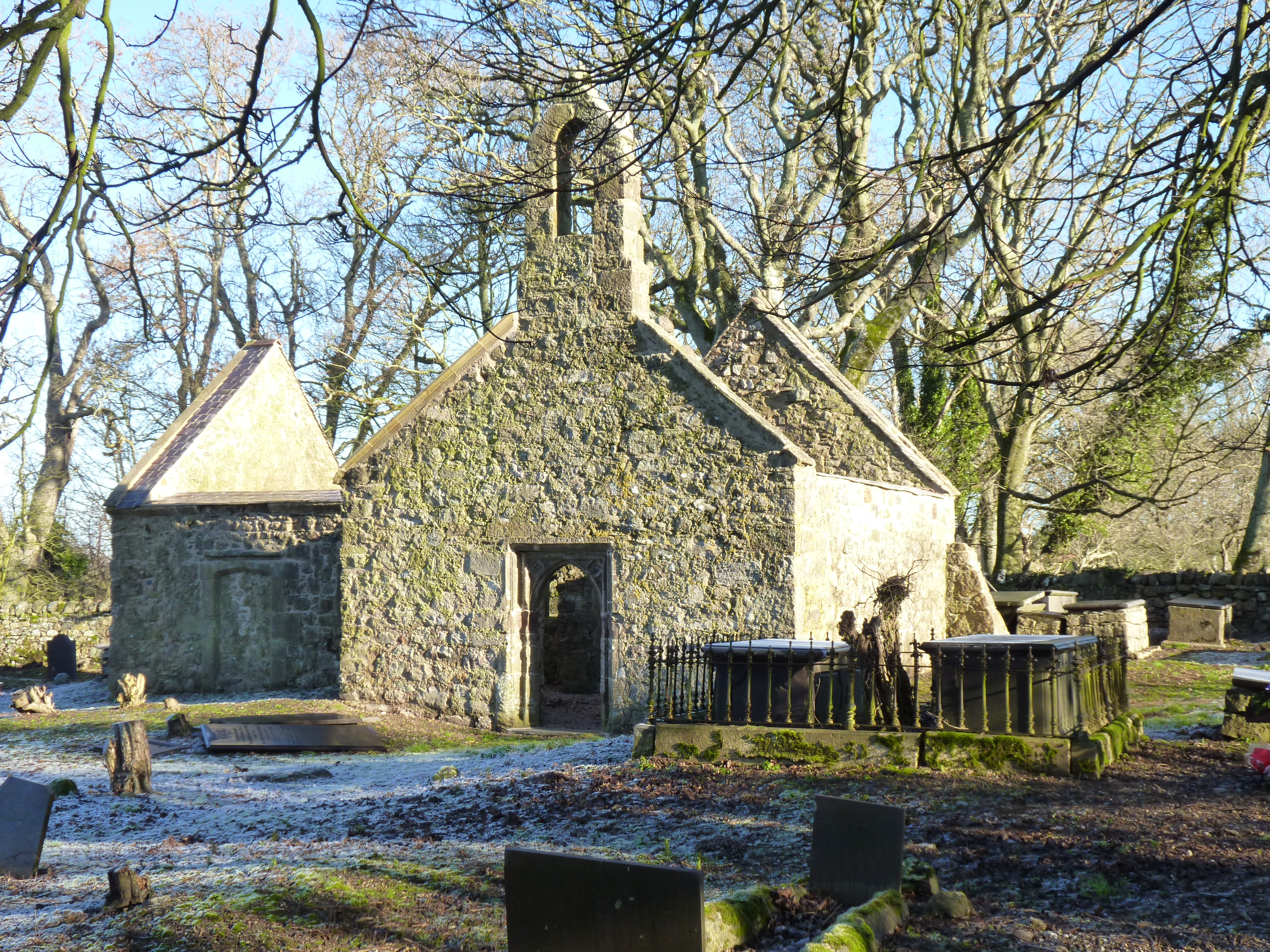
- The remains of St Michael's from the west

- Location in Anglesey
- Location: near Gaerwen, Anglesey
- Country: Wales
- Previous denomination: Church of England

History
- Status: Parish church
- Dedication: St Michael

Architecture
- Functional status: Ruins
- Heritage designation: Grade II
- Designated: 30 January 1968
- Architectural type: Church

St Michael's Church, Llanfihangel Ysgeifiog, is a former parish church in Anglesey, Wales, which is now closed and in ruins. The structure dates from the 15th century and a chapel was added to the north side in the 17th century. A replacement church (St Michael's, Gaerwen) was built elsewhere in the parish in 1847, and the old church was closed, partly demolished and abandoned. Some restoration work has taken place in the 21st century and some occasional services have been held.

It is a Grade II listed building, a national designation given to "buildings of special interest, which warrant every effort being made to preserve them", in particular because it is "an important survival, retaining unrestored original late medieval features."

== History and location ==
St Michael's Church is set in a churchyard in the countryside of Anglesey, north Wales, about 1.4 kilometres (0.87 mi) from the village of Gaerwen. A footpath leads to the church from the nearest road, 200 metres (660 ft) away. The area Llanfihangel Ysgeifiog takes its name, in part, from the church: the Welsh word llan originally meant "enclosure" and then "church", and "-fihangel" is a modified form of Michael (Welsh: Mihangel), the saint to whom the church is dedicated.

The present structure dates from the 15th century and was extended in 1638 when a local family added a chapel on the north side. A decision was taken in the 1840s to build a new church on a different site within the parish; the centre of population for the area had shifted because of coal mining in Pentre Berw and the construction of the A5 road across Anglesey as part of Thomas Telford's road from London to Holyhead. St Michael's, Gaerwen, opened in 1847. The old church then closed. By 1865, when the Welsh politician and church historian Sir Stephen Glynne visited, only the chancel and north chapel remained, and a new wall had been built at the west end of the chancel where it once joined the nave. Some restoration work has taken place in the 21st century, assisted by funding from the Welsh Government and Cadw (the statutory body responsible for the built heritage of Wales), and services have occasionally been held.

By 1535, the positions of rector of St Michael's and vicar of St Ffinan's Church were combined and held by the Dean of Bangor to increase the dean's income. Other people associated with the church include Nicholas Owen (appointed perpetual curate in 1790), the priest and antiquarian John Jones (better known as "Llef o'r Nant"; curate 1809–15), and Evan Lewis (curate 1845–46, and later Dean of Bangor).

== Architecture and fittings ==
All that remains of the church is the chancel, which is 18 feet 6 inches by 14 feet 6 inches (5.6 by 4.4 m), and the north chapel which is 15 feet 6 inches by 13 feet (4.7 by 4.0 m); the nave, south chapel and the roof have been demolished or removed. The walls are built from rubble masonry dressed with sandstone. The church is now entered through a doorway at the west end of the chancel; the doorway reuses a 15th-century pointed arch. The south wall still shows where there was formerly a chapel on that side. On the opposite wall, there is a window from the late 16th century with three lights (sections of window separated by stonework); the entrance to the north chapel has been reduced in width. The three-light east window also dates from the late 16th century. An inscribed stone above the window records the date 1598.

The north chapel has windows in the north and east wall in similar style to those in the chancel. There is an inscription above the north window recording the construction of the chapel in 1638. The west wall of the chapel has a blocked round-headed window, and there is a blocked-up pointed-arch doorway in the north wall.

The priest and antiquarian Harry Longueville Jones visited St Michael's in 1845. At that time, the church was 68 by 16 feet (20.7 by 4.9 m) internally; he recorded the north chapel as measuring 12 feet 8 inches by 17 feet (3.9 by 5.2 m) and the south chapel, which was separated from the main body of the church by five rotting wooden columns, as 40 by 15 feet (12.2 by 4.6 m). The main entrance was through a porch on the south side of the nave, and there was another door on the north side. A bench under the windows on the north side of the nave was inscribed "T. M. 1684". The southern chapel, he said, had similar windows to those in the north chapel. On the external wall above the east window, he noted a shield topped by a coronet, apparently that of a viscount, and the date 1638. On a step by the altar he noted two gravestones that appeared to be those of priests, given that they had each been inscribed with a cross, and a third gravestone, similarly marked, was in use as the lintel above one of the doorways. A survey in 1937 by the Royal Commission on Ancient and Historical Monuments in Wales and Monmouthshire dated one of the gravestones by the altar to the 11th or 12th century.

The churchyard contains some chest tombs from the 18th and 19th centuries, made of slate. The Royal Commission's survey also noted a fragment of a gravestone from between the 9th and 11th centuries that had been built into the bellcote, and two 18th-century memorials within the church. The bell, church plate, and two benches bearing the inscription "T. M. 1684" were moved to the new church. South east of the church is a Commonwealth war grave of a Marine from World War II.

== Assessment ==
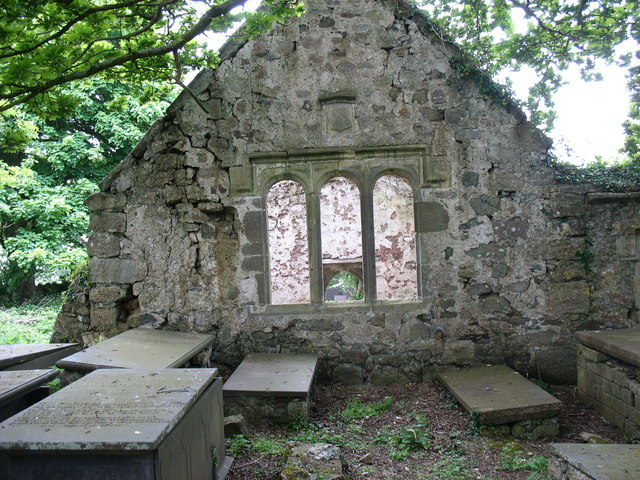
Graves outside the east window

The church has national recognition and statutory protection from unauthorised alteration as it has been designated as a Grade II listed building – the lowest of the three grades of listing, designating "buildings of special interest, which warrant every effort being made to preserve them". It was given this status on 30 January 1968, and has been listed because it consists of "the substantial remains of a 15th-century church with 17th-century additions." Cadw, which is responsible for the inclusion of Welsh buildings on the statutory lists, also notes that because many old churches on Anglesey were rebuilt in the 19th century but this one was not, "these remains constitute an important survival, retaining unrestored original late medieval features."

Writing in 1833, before the church was closed, the antiquarian Angharad Llwyd described St Michael's as "a spacious and ancient structure." She also noted the "ancient stained glass" in the east window, "of brilliant colours". Visiting twelve years later, Harry Longueville Jones said that St Michael's was "greatly dilapidated" but had been "one of the most interesting in the island". He described the north doorway of the nave as having "singularly elegant though mutilated details" and the bellcote as being "of good design". The state of the church, he wrote, was such that it was "almost unfit for the purposes of public worship."

Sir Stephen Glynne noted on his visit in 1865 that the church was now abandoned and presenting "a wretched scene of decay" internally. He commented upon the "good mouldings and spandrels" of the doorway at the west end of the chancel, and also referred to the "debased character" of the north chapel.

A 2006 guide to the churches of Anglesey describes it as being in "a lonely spot" and says that it is "well worth a visit."
