= Red Wharf Bay and Benllech railway station =

Disused railway station in Anglesey, Wales

Red Wharf Bay & Benllech
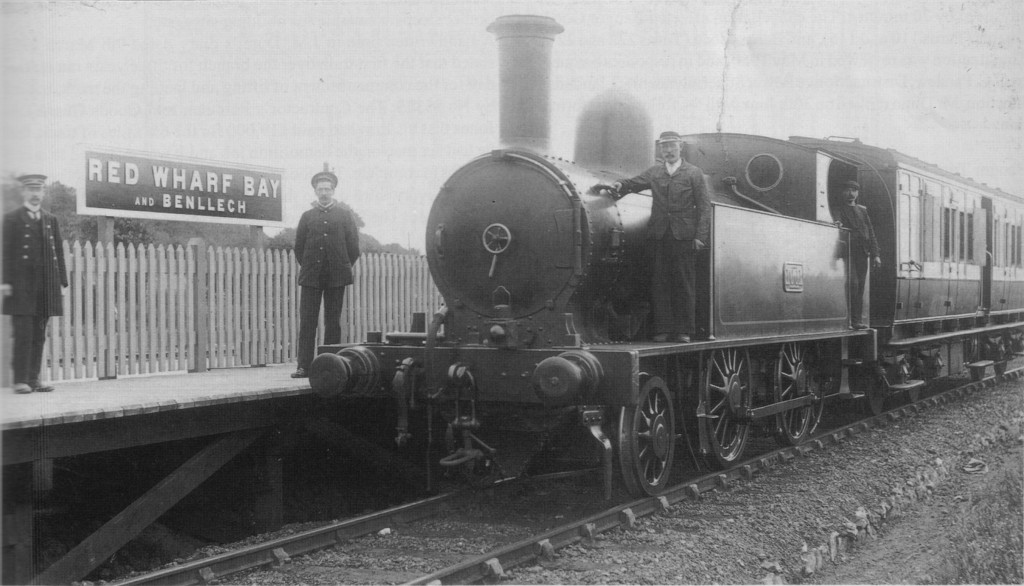

General information
- Location: South of Benllech, Anglesey; Wales
- Coordinates: 53.3081°N 4.2206°W
- Grid reference: SH521813
- Platforms: 1

Other information
- Status: Disused

History
- Original company: London and North Western Railway
- Pre-grouping: London and North Western Railway
- Post-grouping: London Midland and Scottish Railway

Key dates
- 24 May 1909: Opened
- 22 September 1930: Closed to regular passenger services
- 3 April 1950: closed completely
Location

Red Wharf Bay and Benllech railway station was the terminus station of the Red Wharf Bay branch line, which ran between Holland Arms and Benllech, off the Anglesey Central Railway.

== History ==
The original plan had been to build the station 0.1 mile from Red Wharf Bay, but the final plans saw it built half a mile south of nearby Benllech. Opened in 1909, the station had a waiting room, ticket office, toilets and the longest platform on the line, at 260 feet (79 m) (although this was later shortened). The goods yard to the east of the platform contained three sidings and a loop. The approach to the station, from the south, was the site of the only signal on the line. Soon after the completion of the line a local businessman opened up a limestone quarry with the intention of transporting the produce via the new station.

The station was closed to regular passenger services in 1930 but summer specials ran in 1938 and 1939. Goods trains continued until 1950. The track was taken up in 1953 and most of the buildings were demolished at around that time, although the main station building itself still exists. There is now nothing existing on the site other than a few artefacts from the original demolition. The site was used as a storage facility for a number of years, but is now a wood yard.

Preceding station	Historical railways	Following station
Llanbedrgoch	Red Wharf Bay Branch	Terminus
