= Rhyd-y-Saint railway station =

Disused railway station in Anglesey, Wales

Rhyd-y-Saint
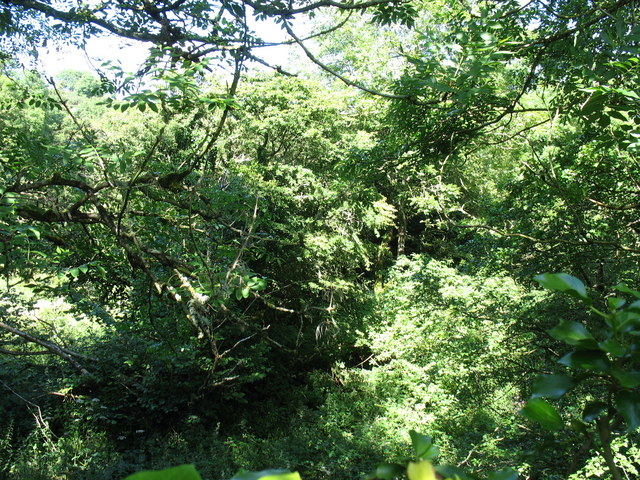

General information
- Location: Southeast of Talwrn, Anglesey; Wales
- Coordinates: 53.2586°N 4.2504°W
- Grid reference: SH499758
- Platforms: 1

Other information
- Status: Disused

History
- Original company: London and North Western Railway
- Pre-grouping: London and North Western Railway
- Post-grouping: London Midland and Scottish Railway

Key dates
- 1 July 1908: Opened
- 22 September 1930: Closed
Location

Rhyd-y-Saint railway station was situated on the Red Wharf Bay branch line between Holland Arms railway station and Benllech, the second station after the line branched from the main Anglesey Central Railway. Legend has it that the station's name (Ford of the Saints) is derived from the nearby ford where two of Anglesey's most famous saints, Cybi and Seiriol are said to have met from time to time.

Opening in 1908 it was a very simple station with only one short (60 ft) platform on the Down (north-west) side and a wooden waiting hut. It was an unstaffed request stop with no goods yard or sidings. Access to the station was via a short flight of steps from the minor road passing above the station. A look at any modern or contemporary Ordnance Survey map will show that this, along with the preceding station Ceint are perhaps two of the most remote on the island.

The station closed in 1930, as did the line itself to passenger trains, and the station building removed. The tracks themselves were taken up in 1953 and very little evidence remains of the station, the overgrown platform being just about visible.

Preceding station	Historical railways	Following station
Ceint	Red Wharf Bay Branch	Pentraeth
