= Llangefni railway station =

Disused railway station on Anglesey, Wales

Coordinates: 53.2565°N 4.3147°W

Llangefni
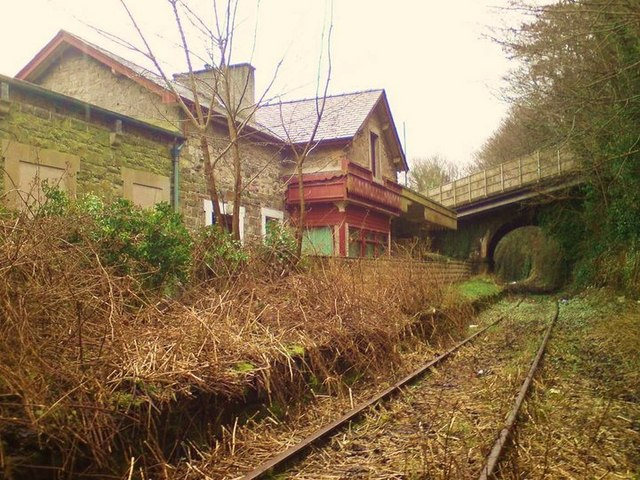
- The site of the station in 2011

General information
- Location: Llangefni, Anglesey, Wales
- Platforms: 1

Other information
- Status: Disused

History
- Original company: Anglesey Central Railway
- Pre-grouping: London and North Western Railway
- Post-grouping: London, Midland and Scottish Railway

Key dates
- 1866: Opened
- 7 December 1964: Closed
Location

Llangefni railway station was situated on the Anglesey Central Railway line from Gaerwen to Amlwch; it served the village of Llangefni, on Anglesey, Wales.

== History ==
A temporary terminus station was opened in 1864, approximately a quarter of a mile south of the current station. This station, near Glanhwfa Road, could be opened prior to the completion of bridge and cutting by which the railway travels through Llangefni. Once the portion of the line to Llanerchymedd had passed inspection in January 1866, the permanent station was opened.

Little is known of the temporary station, but it may have seen some use as a goods yard after its closure to passengers.

The line was single tracked and, although a short loop was in existence on the down (south) side, it was never used as a passing loop.

A gated track, presumably for livestock, ran diagonally down the steep hill side opposite the station and below the primary school. The gate was still there in the 1960s, with its railway company plate, although the track itself was heavily overgrown.

The two-storey station building was located on the up side of the track as was the small waggon shed and larger goods yard. The goods yard was used mainly for cattle, as Llangefni is the island's market town. A platform extension was undertaken in 1887 when the LNWR took over the line.

All stations on the Anglesey Central line closed to passengers in 1964, as part of the Beeching Axe; goods works continued until 1993.

== The site today ==
The line has not been removed, but the loop and the sidings have been; the latter is used as a car park. The station buildings are now in private ownership. One of the best places on the island to see the remaining tracks are located in the Dingle (Nant Y Pandy) nature reserve near the station.

== Possible reopening ==
In November 2009, the Welsh Assembly asked Network Rail to conduct a feasibility study on reopening the line between Llangefni and Bangor for passenger services. Network Rail assessed the track bed and published its report in 2010, although a business case to reopen the line is yet to be developed.

== Incidents ==
On 11 October 2018, the overbridge carrying the line across the A5114 was struck by a 'convoi exceptionnel' HGV in the service of Martex; the damage to the bridge was judged too severe for it to remain in situ once the vehicle had been recovered, therefore on 14 October 2018, two 100~tonne capacity cranes attended the site, first extracting the road vehicle, then stripping off the track panels from the bridge deck, finally removing the bridge span. All recovered railway materials, including the damaged bridge, were taken to the Gwalchmai yard of Bob Francis Cranes. Thus, the previously mothballed route is now severed; the Daily Post has covered these events, mostly because the road closure has been an inconvenience locally.

Preceding station	Disused railways	Following station
Holland Arms	Anglesey Central Railway	Llangwyllog
