= Castell Mawr Rock =

Limestone rock in Anglesey, Wales

Coordinates: 53.3103°N 4.2061°W

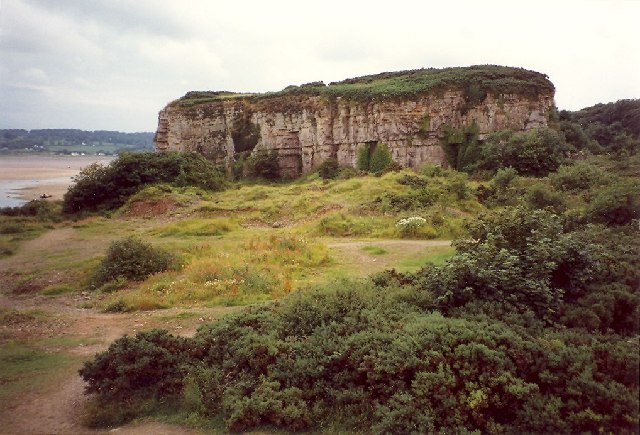
Castell Mawr - view from the north side in 1993

Castell Mawr is a large limestone rock on the western shore of Red Wharf Bay in Anglesey, north Wales. It was probably once the site of an Iron Age fort, but today the rock is a protected refuge for nesting seabirds.

It is located between the village of Red Wharf Bay and the promontory where St. David's Holiday Park is sited. The closest large villages are Pentraeth and Benllech.

The site is notable for being the only location on Anglesey displaying genuine karst development in a series of small caves and solutional cavities.

Castell Mawr was selected by the Countryside Council for Wales because of its geological interest, as it provides exposures of carboniferous limestone strata. The rock consists of limestone and sandstone layers, part of the Benllech Limestone formed during the Brigantian Stage of the lower Carboniferous period. The limestone was once mined and exported to other centres in the UK and Ireland.
