= Beaumaris Food Festival =

Food festival in Wales

- Dates: August/September
- Location: Beaumaris
- Founded: 2013
- Founders: Anglesey Events Ltd

Beaumaris Food Festival was an annual food festival held over a weekend usually during September in Beaumaris. It was last held in 2019.

== Overview ==
The festival is notable for being a major event in the town of Beaumaris and has attracted over 100 exhibitors. There is an entry fee for adults and it is free for children. The festival has also included half price entry to Beaumaris Castle, Beaumaris Gaol and the Courthouse.

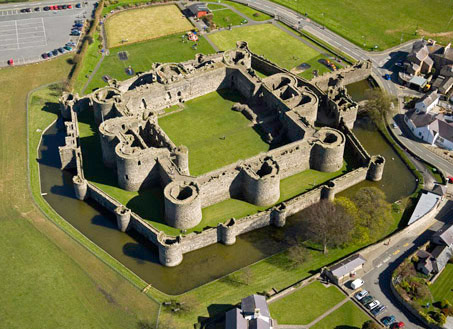
Beaumaris Castle

The festival is held on the town green, which is located next to Beaumaris Castle and the Menai Strait and the festival has a view of Snowdon.

Marquees and street food stalls are also located throughout the town, which is enclosed by defensive town walls. Venues and locations participating in the festival have included Beaumaris Pier, Canolfan Beaumaris, the David Hughes Centre, White Lion Square, Bulkeley Hotel and the Town Hall.

== Focus ==
The main purpose of the festival is stated to be the raising of money for local causes. The festival focus is on food and drink including local, national and international food and producers and has included chef demonstrations by local and celebrity chefs.

Other activities have included children's cooking classes, storytelling, interactive sessions, live music, choirs and a talk tent. Bangor University has organised talks by guest speakers and activities that link to the arts including film, music, and literature. Other talks have included history, sustainability, nature and culture. Medieval reenactments have been held in the castle grounds.

There is free parking and park and ride buses.

== Structure and support ==
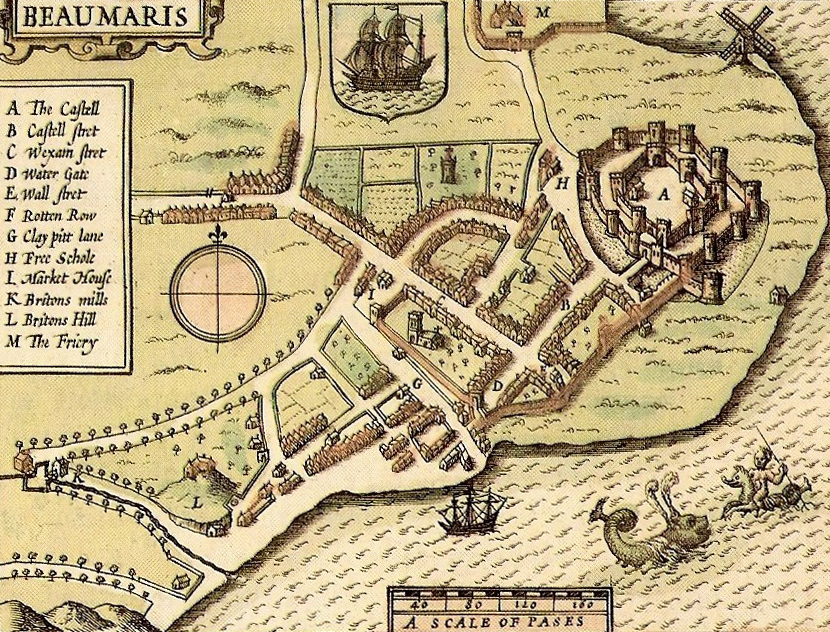
street plan of Beaumaris

The festival is organised and run by Anglesey Events Ltd, which is a limited company. The festival has been supported by Welsh Government through the Food Festival Grant Scheme.

The festival is reported to have raised a six figure sum since it started in 2013. The festival has provided funds in support of Canolfan Beaumaris Leisure Centre, which is a social enterprise and community centre located in Beaumaris. The Centre provides courses and activities for the local area. Local producers have credited the festival for the opportunity it has given for exhibitors to speak directly with potential customers and to increase brand awareness.
