= Llangwyllog railway station =

Disused railway station in Anglesey, Wales

Coordinates: 53.2854°N 4.3472°W

Llangwyllog
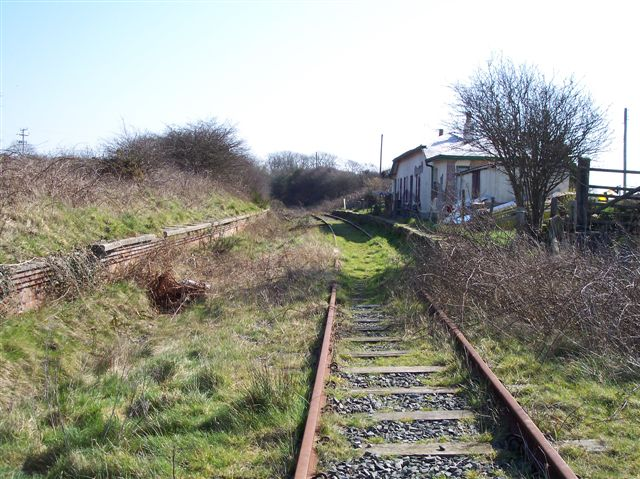
- Llangwyllog station in 2005, looking south. The passing loop that served the left-hand platform has been taken up

General information
- Location: Llangwyllog, Anglesey; Wales
- Platforms: 2

Other information
- Status: Disused

History
- Original company: Anglesey Central Railway
- Pre-grouping: London and North Western Railway
- Post-grouping: London, Midland and Scottish Railway

Key dates
- 1 February 1866: Opened
- 7 December 1964: Closed
Location

Llangwyllog railway station was situated on the Anglesey Central Railway line from Gaerwen to Amlwch. The line between Llangefni and Llanerchymedd opened on 1 February 1866, Llangwyllog station opened the same day. The single storey station building with ticket and waiting room was located on the Down (west) side the platform being extended in 1890. A small goods shed was located north of the main building. In 1914 a passing loop was installed at the station, the only one of the whole Anglesey Central line. Another platform was also installed in the year on the opposite side of the line which had a wooden shelter on it.

All stations on the Anglesey Central line closed to passengers in 1964 as part of the Beeching Axe although freight works continued until 1993. The line is still in situ but the goods track and the passing loop has been lifted. The station building itself is now privately owned.

Preceding station	Disused railways	Following station
Llangefni	Anglesey Central Railway	Llanerchymedd
