= Rhosgoch railway station =

Disused railway station in Anglesey, Wales

Coordinates: 53.3773°N 4.3926°W

Rhosgoch
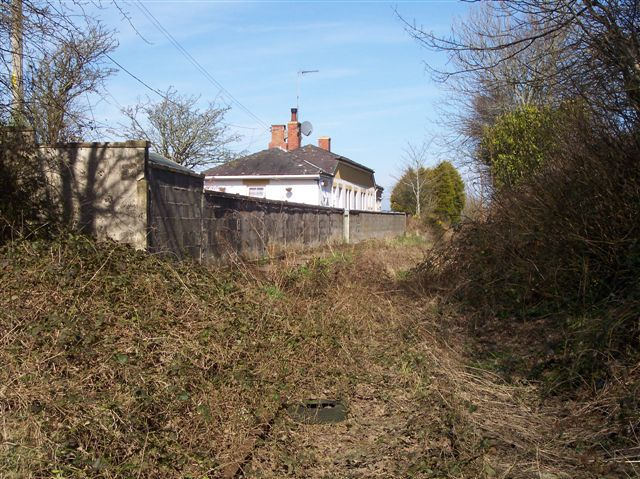

General information
- Location: Rhosgoch, Anglesey; Wales
- Platforms: 1

Other information
- Status: Disused

History
- Original company: Anglesey Central Railway
- Pre-grouping: LNWR
- Post-grouping: LMS

Key dates
- 1867: Opened
- 7 December 1964: Closed
Location

Rhosgoch railway station was situated on the Anglesey Central Railway line from Gaerwen to Amlwch. It had a small platform on the Down (west) side of the track, the original wooden building on which was replaced in 1882 by a brick building. To the north of the platform was a small goods yard. In the 1970s a private siding was constructed to connect the line to the Shell Oil Tank Farm nearby.

All stations on the Anglesey Central line closed to passengers in 1964 as part of the Beeching Axe although freight works continued until 1993. The goods yard and Tank Farm have been removed but the sidings and station building remains, the former owned by Isle of Anglesey County Council and the latter by a private individual.

Preceding station	Disused railways	Following station
Llanerchymedd	Anglesey Central Railway	Amlwch
