= Ceint =

Ceint may refer to either:

- Kent in historical contexts, including
  - The Kingdom of Kent (Old Welsh: Ceint)
  - Canterbury (Old Welsh: Cair Ceint)
- Afon Ceint, a tributary of the Cefni on Anglesey
  - Ceint, a small village in Llanddyfnan parish
  - Ceint railway station, a station that served the area
