= Beaumaris Town Hall =

Municipal Building in Beaumaris, Wales

- Neuadd y Dref Biwmares (Welsh)
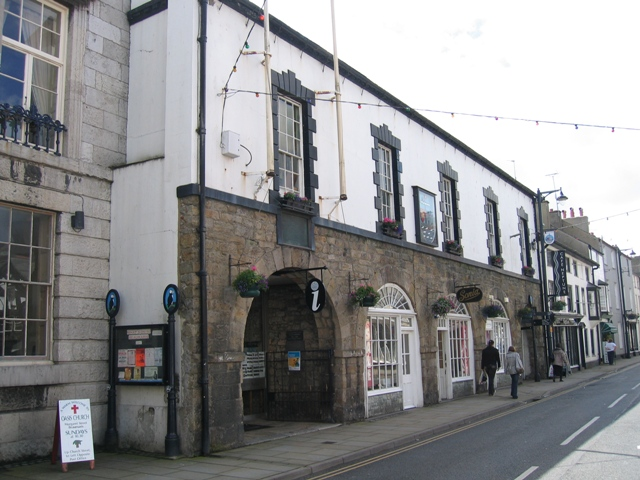
- Beaumaris Town Hall

- Shown in Anglesey
- 53.2631°N 4.0921°W
- Location: Castle Street, Beaumaris

History
- Built: c.1785

Site notes
- Architectural style: Neoclassical style

Listed Building – Grade II
- Official name: Town Hall
- Designated: 23 September 1950
- Reference no.: 5589

Beaumaris Town Hall (Welsh: Neuadd y Dref Biwmares) is a municipal building on Castle Street, in Beaumaris, Anglesey, Wales. The structure, which is the meeting place of Beaumaris Town Council, is a Grade II listed building.

== History ==
The first municipal building in the town was an Elizabethan structure in Castle Street which was completed in 1563. By the late 18th century, it had become dilapidated and the local member of parliament and Irish Peer, Thomas Bulkeley, 7th Viscount Bulkeley, offered to pay for the construction of a new structure on the same site.

The new building was designed in the neoclassical style, built in gritstones and was completed in around 1785. The design involved a symmetrical main frontage with five bays facing onto Castle Street; the ground floor, which was finished in rubble masonry, featured five round headed openings with voussoirs, while the first floor, which was finished in painted roughcast, was fenestrated by five sash windows with rusticated architraves and triple keystones. At roof level, there was a modillioned cornice. Internally, the principal rooms were the market hall on the ground floor and the ballroom on the first floor. The latter room was described by the publisher of topographical dictionaries, Samuel Lewis, as "the most splendid ballroom in North Wales".

A touring cinema company briefly offered silent film performances on a once weekly basis in the ballroom during the early part of the First World War. In January 1940, during the Second World War, after the cargo ship, SS Gleneden, was hit by a German torpedo off Bardsey Island and then beached off Puffin Island, all 60 crew were rescued and given food and drink in the building.

The town hall continued to serve as the meeting place of the borough council for much of the 20th century, but ceased to be the local seat of government when the enlarged Ynys Môn-Isle of Anglesey Borough Council was formed at Llangefni in 1974. Instead, it became the meeting place of Beaumaris Town Council. Shop fronts were installed in the central three openings to a design by Colwyn Foulkes and Partners of Colwyn Bay in 1975.
