= Llef o'r Nant =

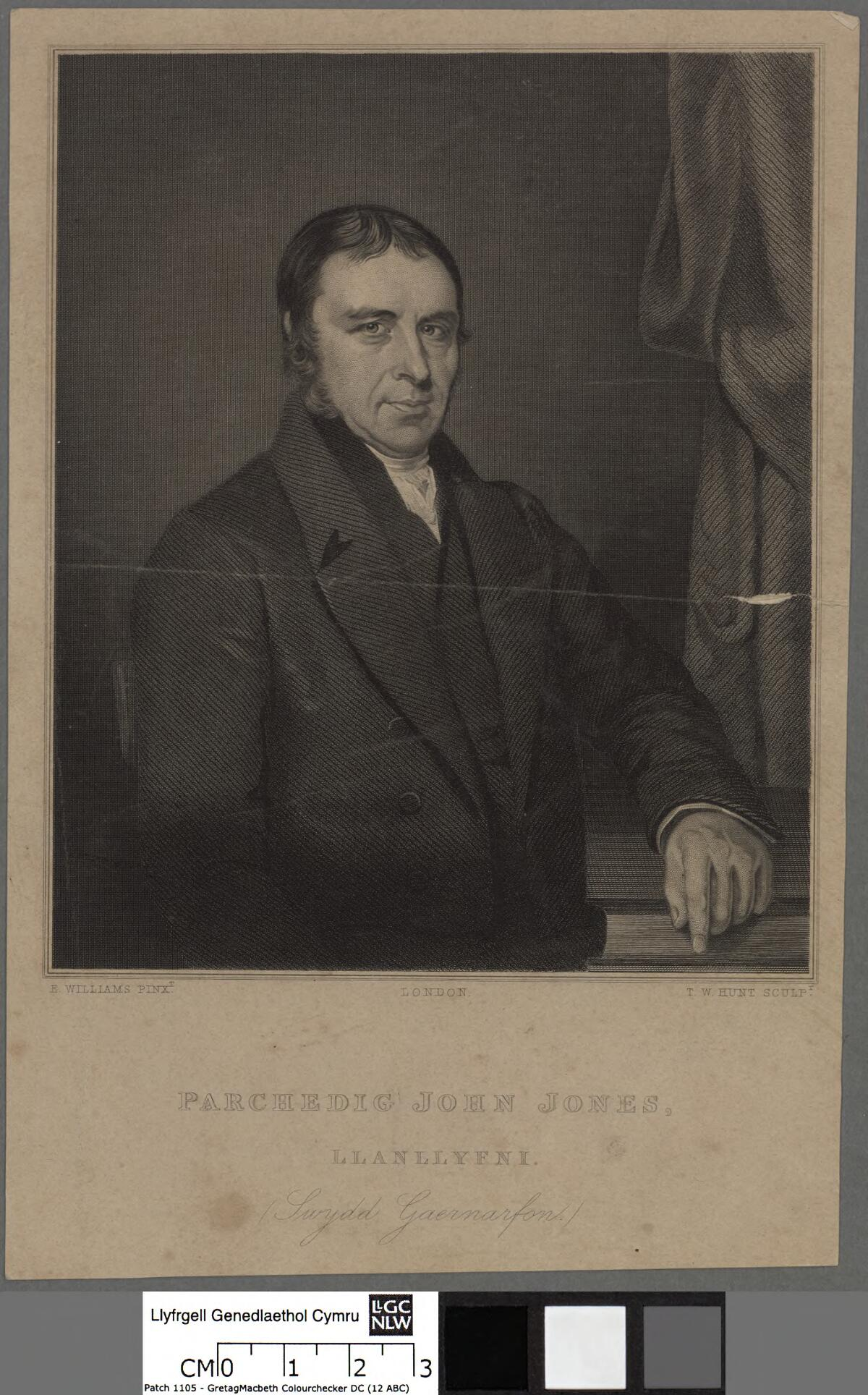
A portrait from the Welsh Portrait Collection at the National Library of Wales. Depicted person: John Jones – British antiquarian

John Jones (known as Llef o'r Nant (1782 or 1787 – 12 February 1863) was a Welsh Anglican priest and antiquarian.

== Life ==
Jones, whose father was John Jones of Machynlleth, west Wales, was born at some time between 1782 (according to the age given his tombstone) and 1787 (according to Alumni Oxonienses). educated at Friars School, Bangor and Jesus College, Oxford. He matriculated at Jesus College in 1804 and graduated in 1808. He became a member of Lincoln's Inn in 1808. After his ordination, he was curate of Llanfihangel Ysgeifiog, Anglesey, north Wales from 1809 to 1815, when he became curate of Llanfair is Gaer, Caernarfonshire. In 1819, he was appointed rector of Llanllyfni, Caernarfonshire, where he was buried after his death on 12 February 1863. His published writings, some using the pseudonym "Llef o'r Nant", included seven sermons and antiquarian contributions to various journals and periodicals; some of his writings were published separately in 1822. He was one of the first members of the Cambrian Archaeological Association.
