= Llanerchymedd railway station =

Disused railway station in Anglesey, Wales

Llanerchymedd
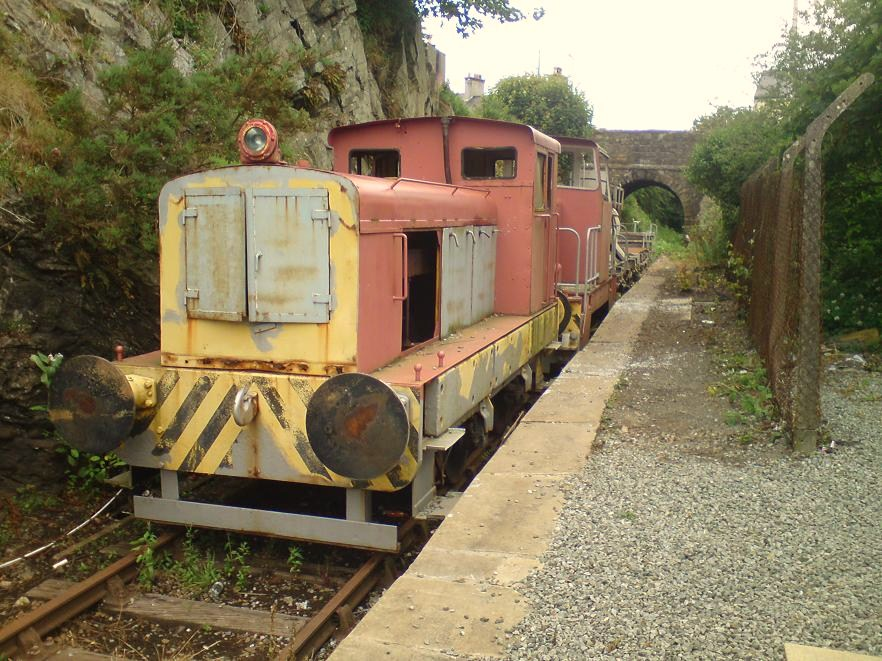

General information
- Location: Llanerchymedd, Anglesey; Wales
- Coordinates: 53.3299°N 4.3790°W
- Platforms: 1

Other information
- Status: Disused

History
- Original company: Anglesey Central Railway
- Pre-grouping: London and North Western Railway
- Post-grouping: London, Midland and Scottish Railway

Key dates
- 1 February 1866: Opened
- 7 December 1964: Closed
Location

Llanerchymedd railway station was situated on the Anglesey Central Railway line from Gaerwen to Amlwch. There was a single platform with a small station building located on the Up (east) side of the track. Three sidings and two small goods sheds made a small goods yard, which was up on the Up side.

All stations on the Anglesey Central line closed to passengers in 1964 (the sidings and all buildings but the station building itself were removed) as part of the Beeching Axe although freight works continued until 1993. The station building is owned by Isle of Anglesey County Council and reopened as a heritage centre, museum and community café in 2010. There is also the possibility of re-opening at least part of the branch to passengers.

Preceding station	Disused railways	Following station
Llangwyllog	Anglesey Central Railway	Rhosgoch
