= Beaumaris town walls =

Fifteenth-century defensive structure built around the town of Beaumaris in Wales

- Beaumaris, Wales
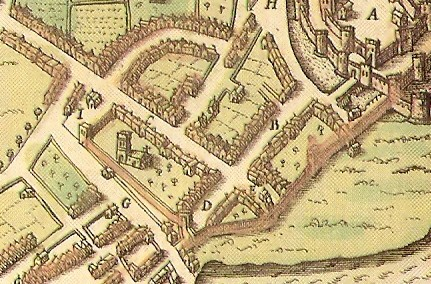
- Beaumaris and the remaining town walls, 1610

Site information
- Type: City wall

Location
- Shown within Wales
- Coordinates: 53.2648°N 4.0897°W

Beaumaris's town walls were a fifteenth-century defensive structure built around the town of Beaumaris in Wales.

== History ==
The town of Beaumaris was constructed by Edward I in 1296, following the English king's successful invasion of North Wales. The town was guarded by a castle, but had no protective wall. Limited foundations appear to have been built for a protective circuit, but despite requests from the townspeople for a town wall in 1315, none was constructed.

In 1400 the Welsh prince Owain Glyndŵr rose in rebellion against English rule, and took Beaumaris in 1403; the town was not recovered until 1405. In response the decision was taken by 1407 to build a town wall; ditches and an earth bank were constructed and by 1414 a stone wall had been built, with three gates and a number of probable towers. This necessitated the moving of a number of residents whose houses fell in the way of the new defences. Despite damage from the nearby sea in 1460, which resulted in some of the walls being rebuilt between 1536 and 1540, the walls were maintained until the late 17th century.

Today only a few fragments of the wall survive; these are protected as a scheduled monument and a grade I listed building. There are some foundations by the "Gate next the Sea" of Beaumaris Castle, and the side wall of one property near the churchyard may be part of the curtain wall, according to the authors of a 2009 guide to the buildings of the region. They also suggest that much of the stone was taken to build houses and Beaumaris Gaol.

== See also ==
- List of town walls in England and Wales

== Bibliography ==
- Creighton, Oliver Hamilton and Robert Higham. (2005) Medieval Town Walls: an Archaeology and Social History of Urban Defence. Stroud, UK: Tempus. ISBN 978-0-7524-1445-4.
- Haslam, Richard; Orbach, Julian; Voelcker, Adam (2009). "Anglesey". The Buildings of Wales: Gwynedd. Yale University Press. ISBN 978-0-300-14169-6.
- Taylor, Arnold. (2009) Beaumaris Castle. Cardiff: Cadw. ISBN 978-1-85760-208-1.
