= Amlwch railway station =

Disused railway station in Anglesey, Wales

Coordinates: 53.40909°N 4.34547°W

Amlwch
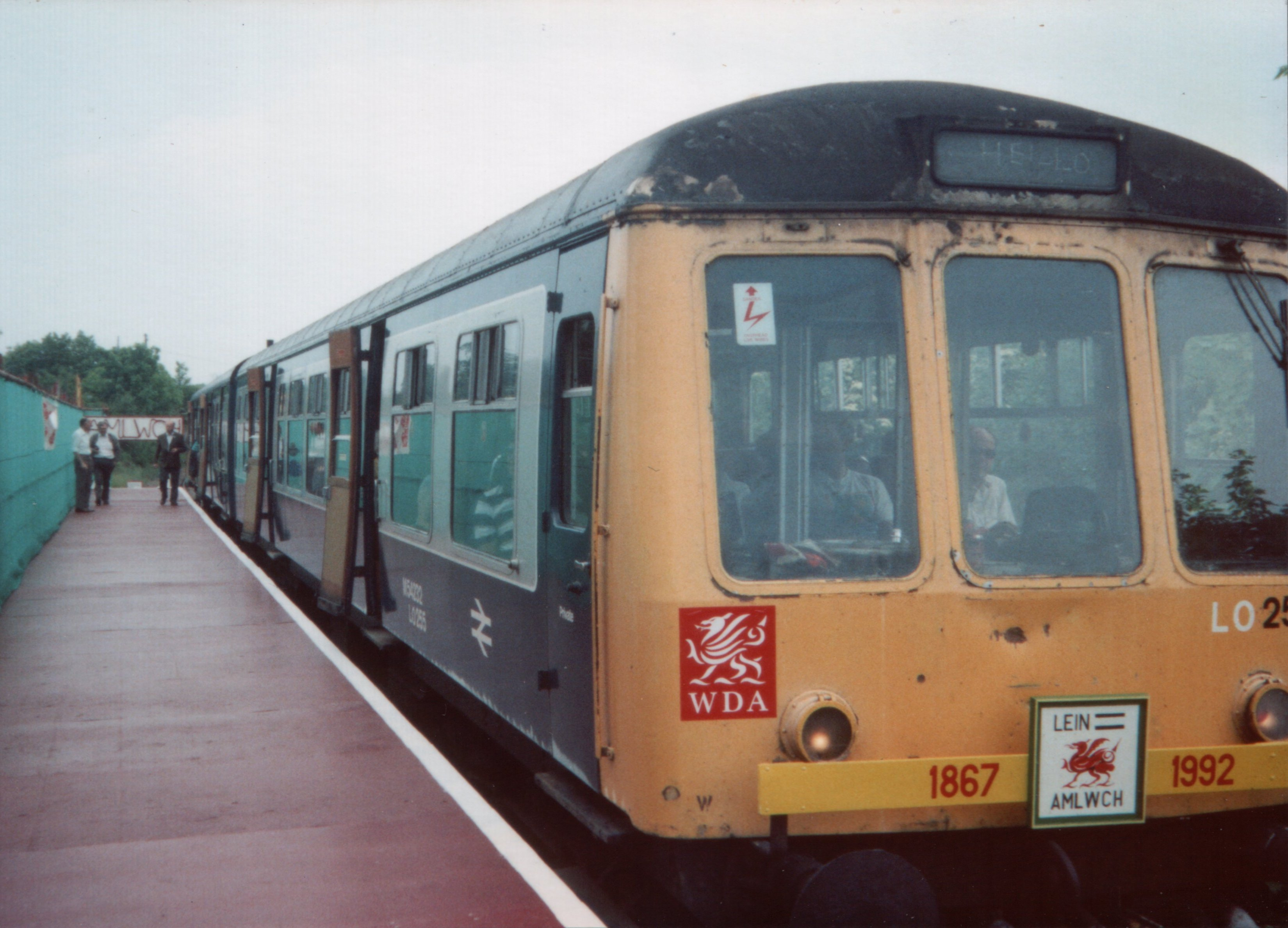
- Amlwch temporary station erected for the Lein Amlwch special trains in 1992

General information
- Location: Amlwch, Isle of Anglesey; Wales
- Platforms: 1

Other information
- Status: Disused

History
- Original company: Anglesey Central Railway
- Pre-grouping: London and North Western Railway
- Post-grouping: London, Midland and Scottish Railway

Key dates
- 3 June 1867: Opened
- 7 December 1964: Closed
Location

Amlwch railway station was the original terminus of the Anglesey Central Railway line from Gaerwen. A light railway extension was later added for freight purposes. All stations on the Amlwch line closed to passengers in 1964 as part of the Beeching Axe; freight works continued until 1993.

== History ==
Opened by the Anglesey Central Railway, then by the London and North Western Railway, it became part of the London, Midland and Scottish Railway during the Grouping of 1923. The station then passed to the London Midland Region of British Railways on nationalisation in 1948. The last trains operated on 5 December 1964, after which it was closed by the British Railways Board. A temporary station for special trains was built about 500 yards from the terminus and used on a few dates in 1992 and 1993.

In August 2020, a bid was made for money to carry out a study to reopen the Anglesey Central Railway between Amlwch and the north Wales main line at Gaerwen. The plan is for regular diesel services for locals and occasional steam trains. The initial bid was made as part of the government's Restoring Your Railway initiative, which awards £50,000 to successful schemes to fund a feasibility study. The bid was submitted for the third round of that scheme and was awarded funding to carry out the study. When the bid was submitted, the Welsh government stated that they would match fund any award that was received, raising the value of the award to £100,000.

Preceding station	Disused railways	Following station
Rhosgoch	Anglesey Central Railway	Terminus
