= Red Wharf Bay =

Bay and village in Anglesey, Wales

Coordinates: 53.304°N 4.19°W

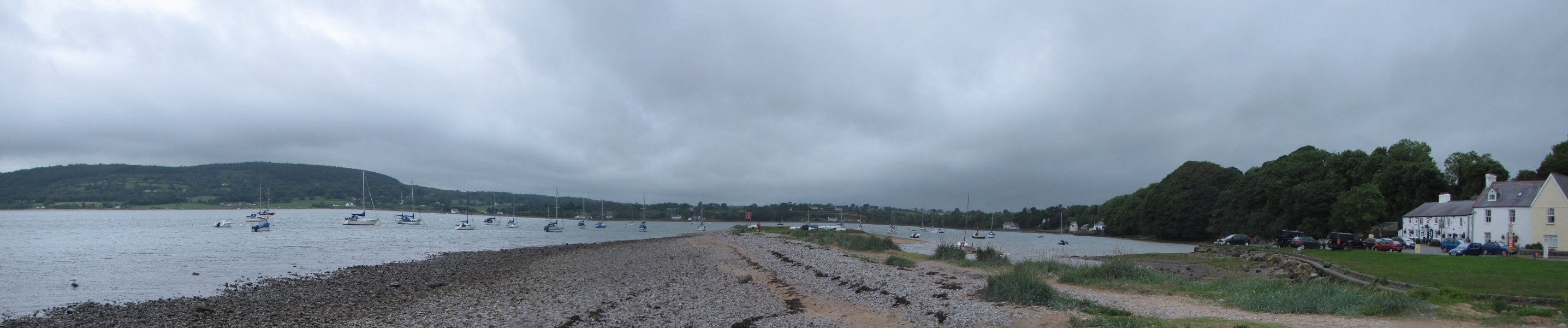

Red Wharf Bay, also known as Traeth Coch (Welsh for "red beach"), is a village and a sandy bay in Anglesey, Wales. The bay lies between the villages of Pentraeth and Benllech. It is also close to Castell Mawr Rock, thought to be the site of an Iron Age fort.

== Description ==
Red Wharf Bay is on the western side of the bay. It is linked to Benllech and Pentraeth via the Anglesey Coastal Path. Red Wharf Bay has three restaurants—The Tavern on the Bay, The Ship Inn, and The Boathouse.

== Wildlife ==
The bay attracts wildlife, including waterfowl and wading birds, such as oystercatcher, shelduck, purple sandpiper, curlew and dunlin. The bay's bordered by salt marshes and sand dunes. Some of these dunes are rich in shell fragments that support the flora common to lime-rich areas, including the pyramidal orchid.

== Events ==
Each year the Red Wharf Bay Sailing Club Anglesey Offshore Dinghy Race takes place from Beaumaris to Traeth Bychan. The 14-mile (23 km) race runs up the Menai Strait and down the Anglesey coast.

== History ==
The name of Traeth Coch is believed to originate from a battle involving Vikings in 1170 that left the beach soaked in blood.

A hoard of five Scandinavian type arm-rings was discovered at Red Wharf Bay between c. 1887 and c. 1894. Historian Mark Redknap wrote that "The Red Wharf Bay arm-rings are probably contemporary with the Cuerdale Hoard (buried c. 905), and it's been suggested that Ingimund’s activities on Anglesey in 903 might have led to the deposition and their non-recovery."

There was once a railway line which terminated at the bay, the Red Wharf Bay branch line, which left the Anglesey Central Railway at Pentre Berw. Stone for the Admiralty Arch, Holyhead was quarried near the bay.
