= Panton Arms Hotel, Pentraeth =

Pub in Pentraeth, Anglesey, Wales

Coordinates: 53.2820°N 4.2156°W

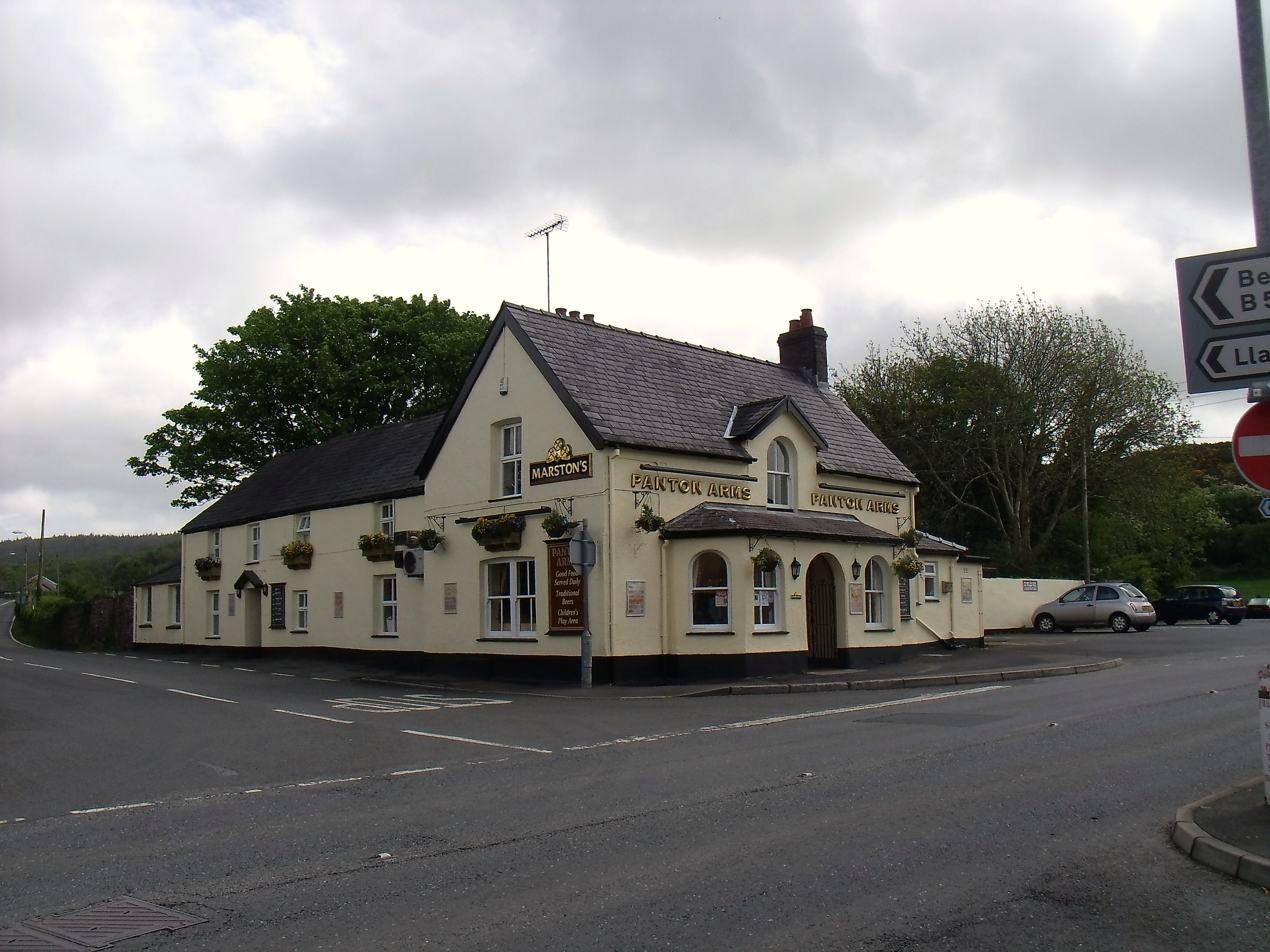
The Panton Arms in 2011

The Panton Arms Hotel, in Pentraeth, Anglesey, is a Grade II listed building situated in the centre of the village. It is named after the Panton family, former landowners from the nearby Plas Gwyn estate. It was built in early-mid 18th century and was listed in 1969. Charles Dickens stayed in the hotel in 1859 when he was sent to cover the sinking of the Royal Charter near Moelfre for his newspaper.

== The 21st Century ==
In August 2016 the landlord Ed Griffiths temporarily renamed the pub "Pokémon Arms" in honor of his younger customers who were using the pub's WiFi to battle their Pokémon at the Poké-Gym and Pokéstop, geolocated over the War Memorial and St Mary's Church across Beaumaris Road. Later that year it was described by ITN as "an oasis of connectivity" due to the pub's association with technology having hosted the local tech club 'Clwb Technoleg Mon' on Sunday nights since 2015. The group has since ceased.
