= Rhos Cefn Hir =

Village in Anglesey, Wales

Coordinates: 53.266136°N 4.216481°W

- Location within Anglesey
- OS grid reference: SH 5227 7664
  - Cardiff: 130.8 mi (210.5 km)
  - London: 210.8 mi (339.2 km)
- Community: Pentraeth
- Principal area: Anglesey
- Country: Wales
- Sovereign state: United Kingdom
- Post town: Pentraeth
- Postcode district: LL75
- Police: North Wales
- Fire: North Wales
- Ambulance: Welsh
- UK Parliament: Ynys Môn
- Senedd Cymru – Welsh Parliament: Ynys Môn

Rhos Cefn Hir (also spelt Rhoscefnhir or Rhos-cefn-hir) is a village in the community of Pentraeth, Anglesey, Wales, which is 130.8 miles (210.5 km) from Cardiff and 210.8 miles (339.2 km) from London.

== See also ==
- List of localities in Wales by population
