= Ceint railway station =

Disused railway station in Anglesey, Wales

Ceint
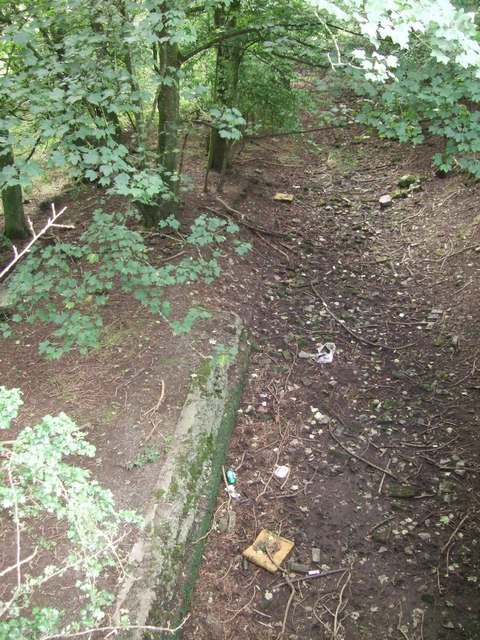
- The platform and trackbed in 2009

General information
- Location: East of Llangefni, Anglesey; Wales
- Coordinates: 53.2495°N 4.2661°W
- Grid reference: SH488749
- Platforms: 1

Other information
- Status: Disused

History
- Original company: London and North Western Railway
- Pre-grouping: London and North Western Railway
- Post-grouping: London Midland and Scottish Railway

Key dates
- 1 July 1908: Opened
- 22 September 1930: Closed
Location

Ceint railway station was a station in Anglesey, Wales situated on the Red Wharf Bay branch line between Holland Arms and Benllech. It was the first station after the line branched from the main Anglesey Central Railway. Opening in 1908 it was a very simple station with only one short 60 ft (18 m) platform on the Up (south-east) side and a wooden waiting hut. It was an unstaffed request stop with neither goods yard nor sidings. Ordnance Survey maps show that this, along with the station next on the line Rhyd-y-Saint are two of the most remote on the island.

When the line closed to passengers in 1930 the station building was removed. Although the tracks were taken up in 1953 the platform itself is still visible from a nearby road bridge.

Preceding station	Historical railways	Following station
Holland Arms	Red Wharf Bay Branch	Rhyd-y-Saint
