= Llanfihangel Ysgeifiog =

Community in Anglesey, Wales

Coordinates: 53°13′23″N 4°17′08″W

- Community
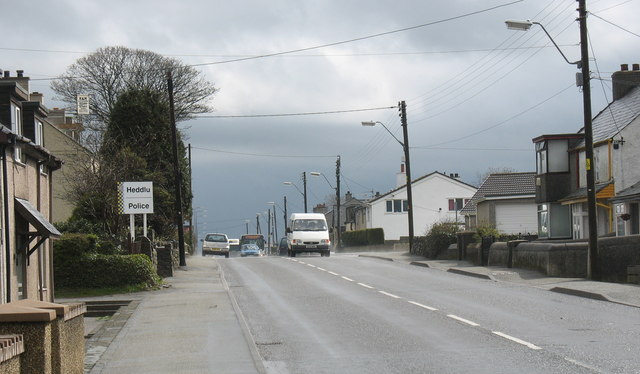
- The main A5 road passing through Gaerwen

- Location within Anglesey
- Principal area: Isle of Anglesey
- Country: Wales
- Sovereign state: United Kingdom
- Police: North Wales
- Fire: North Wales
- Ambulance: Welsh
- UK Parliament: Ynys Môn
- Senedd Cymru – Welsh Parliament: Bangor Conwy Môn
- List of places UK Wales Anglesey Map of the community

Llanfihangel Ysgeifiog (occasionally spelt Llanfihangel Esgeifiog or Llanfihangelesgeifiog) is a community and former ecclesiastical parish in Anglesey, Wales, east of Llangefni.

== Description ==
The community includes the villages of Gaerwen and Pentre Berw; it also includes the Malltraeth Marsh RSPB. The percentage of Welsh language speakers in the community in 2011 was 76.5%.

Coal was mined in the area from the 15th to the 18th centuries.

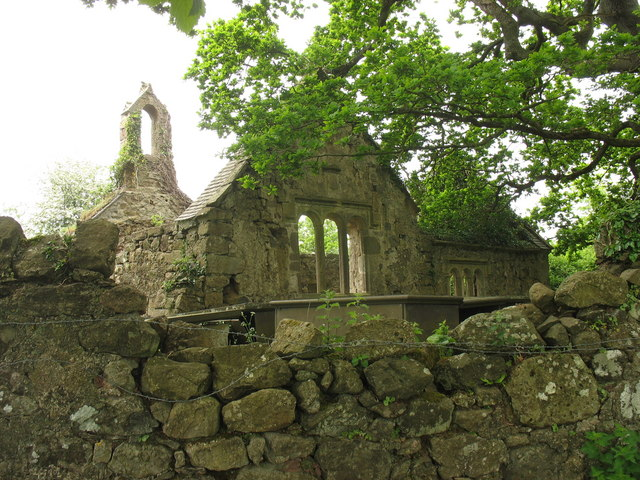
Old St Michael's parish church

The old parish church of St Michael, less than a mile from Gaerwen, now lies in ruins. It was replaced by the new church of St Michael in Gaerwen, in 1847.

== Governance ==
At the local level the community elects eleven community councillors to Llanfihangel Esgeifiog Community Council.

Until 2012 the community's boundaries, together with those of neighbouring Penmynydd, defined the electoral ward of Llanfihangel Ysgeifiog. This ward elected a county councillor to the Isle of Anglesey County Council until The Isle of Anglesey (Electoral Arrangements) Order 2012 redrew the boundaries for the 2013 elections. The 2012 boundary rearrangements included Llanfihangel Ysgeifiog in a larger ward of Bro Rhosyr, which elects two county councillors.

In November 2006 the Plaid Cymru councillor for the Llanfihangel Ysgeifiog ward, Hughie Noel Thomas, was jailed for nine months for falsifying Post Office records and subsequently disqualified as a county councillor. He had been sub-postmaster in Gaerwen. Thomas was released from prison and his name cleared, after a group legal action against the Post Office over faults with its Horizon accounting system.
