= Pentraeth =

Village and community in Anglesey, Wales

- Village
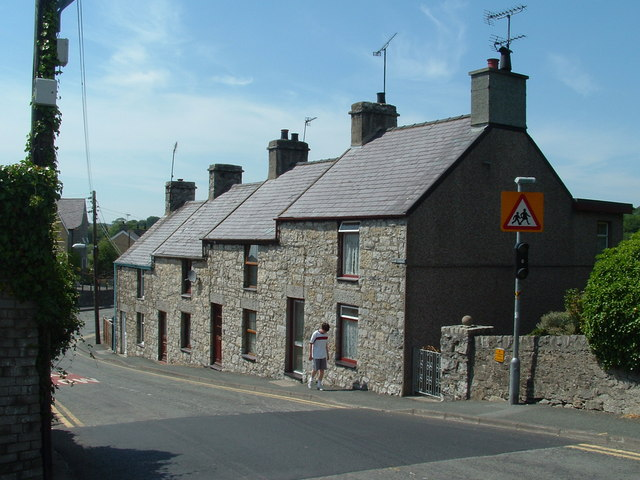
- Nant Terrace, Pentraeth

- Location within Anglesey
- Population: 1,178
- Principal area: Isle of Anglesey
- Preserved county: Gwynedd
- Country: Wales
- Sovereign state: United Kingdom
- Police: North Wales
- Fire: North Wales
- Ambulance: Welsh
- UK Parliament: Ynys Mon
- Senedd Cymru – Welsh Parliament: Bangor Conwy Môn
- List of places UK Wales Anglesey 53.28373°N 4.21695°W Map of the community

Pentraeth (Welsh: ['pɛntraiθ]) is a village and community on the island of Anglesey (Ynys Môn), North Wales, at grid reference SH523786. The Royal Mail postcode begins LL75. The community population taken at the 2011 census was 1,178. The village itself having a population of 557.

== Name ==
Its Welsh name means at the end of (or head of) a beach, and it is located near Traeth Coch (Red Wharf Bay). There is a small river, Afon Nodwydd which runs through it. The village's ancient name was Llanfair Betws Geraint.

== History ==
In 1170 the village was the site of a battle when Hywel ab Owain Gwynedd landed with an army raised in Ireland in an attempt to claim a share of the kingdom of Gwynedd following the death of his father Owain Gwynedd. He was defeated and killed here by the forces of his half-brothers Dafydd ab Owain Gwynedd and Rhodri.

In 1859, Charles Dickens stayed in the village on his trip, as a journalist for The Times, to visit the wreck of the Royal Charter in Moelfre. Between 1908 and 1950 it was served by Pentraeth railway station, on the Red Wharf Bay branch line.

== Amenities ==
The village has a football side, Pentraeth F.C., who play in the Welsh Alliance Division 2, the fourth tier of Welsh football. The centre of the village is the Square. It is bounded by St. Mary's Church and the Panton Arms public house as well as a row of shops called Cloth Hall. This was founded in the 19th century by Benjamin Thomas as a general store. It continued as a grocery store into the 1990s, and is now occupied by a carpet shop as well as a bakery and party-ware hire shop. The community includes Rhos Cefn Hir.

== Notable buildings ==
=== St Mary's Church ===
St Mary's Church is the village church. The date of construction is unknown, but is probably from some time between the 12th to 14th centuries. Some medieval stonework remains in three walls of the building. A chapel was added to the south side in the 16th or 17th century, and the church was altered and refurbished during the 19th century. The church is still in use, as part of the Church in Wales, and is one of five churches in a combined parish. It is a Grade II listed building, a designation given to "buildings of special interest, which warrant every effort being made to preserve them", in particular because of the retention of medieval fabric in a predominantly 19th-century building, and its "fine" memorials.

=== Ty Fry ===
Ty Fry, on the road from Pentraeth to Rhos Cefn Hir, is an important house dating from the 17th century. It is a Grade II* listed building and its garden is listed, also at Grade II*, on the Cadw/ICOMOS Register of Parks and Gardens of Special Historic Interest in Wales.

== Governance ==
Prior to the 2012 Anglesey electoral boundary changes an electoral ward in the same name existed, electing a county councillor to the Isle of Anglesey County Council. This ward included the community of Llanddona and had a total population in 2011 of 1,869.
