= Gaerwen =

Village in Anglesey, Wales

Coordinates: 53.2222°N 4.28°W

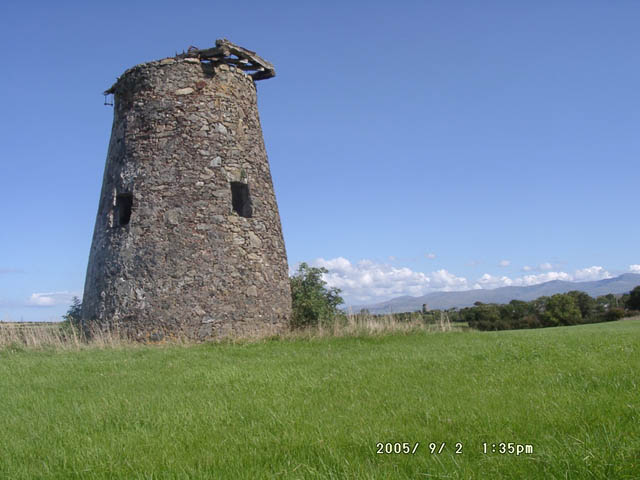
- One of Gaerwen's windmills

- Location within Anglesey
- Population: 1,551 (2011)
- OS grid reference: SH4675
- Community: Llanfihangel Ysgeifiog
- Principal area: Anglesey
- Preserved county: Anglesey
- Country: Wales
- Sovereign state: United Kingdom
- Post town: GAERWEN
- Postcode district: LL60
- Dialling code: 01248
- Police: North Wales
- Fire: North Wales
- Ambulance: Welsh
- UK Parliament: Ynys Môn
- Senedd Cymru – Welsh Parliament: Bangor Conwy Môn

Gaerwen (Welsh pronunciation) is a village on the island of Anglesey in the community of Llanfihangel Ysgeifiog in Wales. It is located in the south of the island 4 miles (6.4 km) west of Llanfairpwllgwyngyll and 4 miles (6.4 km) southeast of Llangefni . The A5 runs through the village, and the A55 runs just a few hundred metres north. According to the 2011 Census Gaerwen is now listed by the Office for National Statistics as Llanfihangel Ysgeifiog. The population of the community is 1,551. Gaerwen, Pentre Berw and Llangaffo form a small built up area.

The village gets its name from a combination of the Welsh words Caer (mutated to Gaer), meaning 'fortification', and Wen, meaning 'white'. There are no clear remains of a fort in the area, although the name was originally that of a farm in the area, before becoming the name for the entire settlement.

== Gaerwen Hoard ==
An important Bronze Age hoard was found near Gaerwen in the nineteenth century. Comprising 2 gold lockrings and 2 penannular bracelets, it is now in the collections of the British Museum.

== Attractions ==
Facilities in Gaerwen include two public houses, and four churches. There are two disused windmills in the north of the village and a modern industrial estate making up the south west portion.

There is a primary school and a football pitch in the middle of the village. There is also a fish and chip shop with a barber shop next door. A science park on the south of the A55 Junction was opened in 2018.

There is a war memorial at the heart of the village paying tribute to those who fell in both World Wars.

== Governance ==
An electoral ward electoral of the same name as the Community exists. The population of this ward at the 2011 census was 2,016.

== Rail lines ==
The village was served by a railway station on both the North Wales Coast Line and the Anglesey Central Railway.
