= Beaumaris Gaol =

Grade I listed building in Anglesey, UK

- Carchar Biwmares (Welsh)
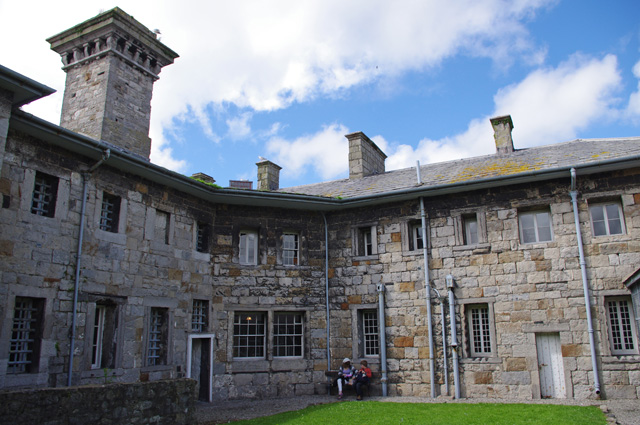
- A section of the jail from inside the courtyard

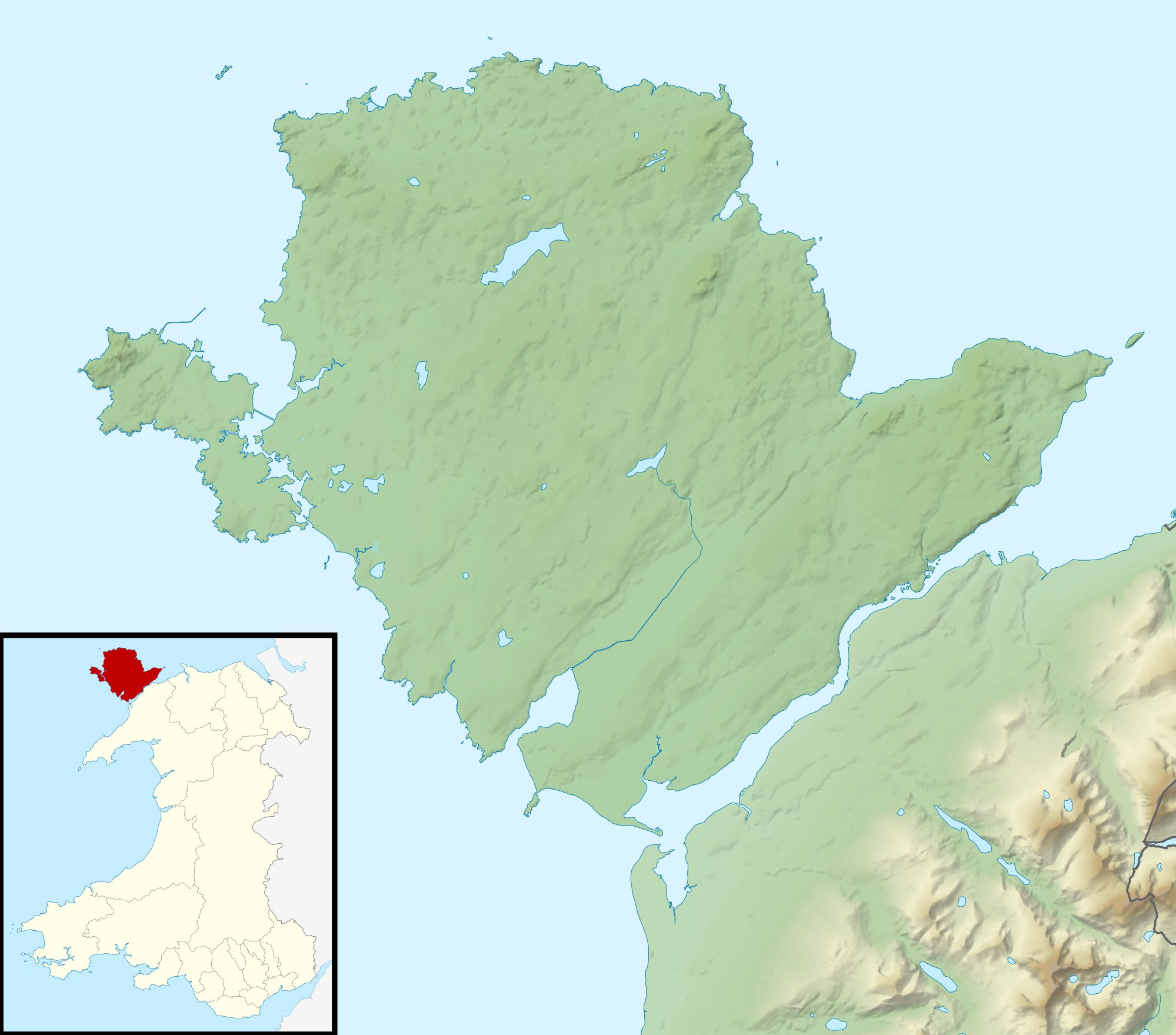
- Location within Anglesey
- 53.2633°N 4.0951°W
- Type: Prison, now museum
- Location: Beaumaris, Anglesey, Wales

History
- Built: 1829

Site notes
- Architect(s): Joseph Hansom, Edward Welch
- Architectural style: Neoclassical
- Governing body: Privately owned

Listed Building – Grade I
- Official name: Beaumaris Gaol
- Designated: 23 September 1950
- Reference no.: 5579

Listed Building – Grade I
- Official name: Perimeter Wall at Beaumaris Gaol
- Designated: 23 September 1950
- Reference no.: 5580

Beaumaris Gaol (Welsh: Carchar Biwmares) is a disused gaol, or prison, located in Beaumaris, Anglesey, Wales. Although no longer in use it remains largely unaltered and is now a museum open to visitors, with around 30,000 visiting each year.

== History ==
The jail was designed by Hansom and Welch, and was built in 1829. It was expanded in 1867 to accommodate approximately 30 inmates but was closed just 11 years later. The building then became a police station until the 1950s when it became a children's clinic and lastly a museum in 1974. During the Second World War the town's air raid siren was located in the gaol and was kept in operation during the Cold War in case of nuclear attacks. The gaol's chapel is not original to the building, and the pews and pulpit were sourced from a chapel being renovated elsewhere on the island; the numbering of the pews is out of sequence and they are not fixed to the floor.

The prison regime may appear brutal to a modern visitor, but in its day it was seen as humane improvement on earlier gaols. Even so, methods of keeping criminals in check included chains, whippings and isolation in a dark cell for up to three days. It has one of the last working penal treadmills in Britain. The treadmill at Beaumaris is unusual in that it pumped water to the top of the building for use in the cells, meaning that the prisoners were not forced to work for no reason.

=== Executions ===
Two hangings took place at Beaumaris. The first was that of William Griffith, in 1830, for the attempted murder of his first wife. On the morning of his execution he barricaded himself inside the cell. The door was eventually forced open and he was half dragged and half carried to the gallows. The second execution was that of Richard Rowlands in 1862, for murdering his father-in-law. He protested his innocence right up to the final moment and legend has it that he cursed the church clock from the gallows, saying that if he were innocent the four faces of the nearby church clock would never show the same time. Both men were buried within the walls of the gaol in a lime pit, but the exact location of their burial is unknown. The iron pins which held the gallows in place, along with the two doors which the condemned man passed through, can still be seen from the street outside the gaol walls.

=== Escape ===
The only prisoner to escape from the gaol was John Morris, who escaped on 7 January 1859, using rope he had stolen whilst working with it. He broke his leg while escaping, but made it out of the town, before being recaptured.

== Listing designations ==
The gaol is a Grade I listed building and its perimeter walls have a separate Grade I listing.
