= Pentre Berw =

Village in Anglesey, Wales

Coordinates: 53.2252°N 4.2881°W

Pentre-Berw
- Location within Anglesey
- OS grid reference: SH 473 722
  - Cardiff: 129 mi (208 km)
  - London: 211 mi (340 km)
- Community: Llanfihangel Ysgeifiog
- Principal area: Anglesey
- Preserved county: Gwynedd
- Country: Wales
- Sovereign state: United Kingdom
- Post town: Gaerwen
- Police: North Wales
- Fire: North Wales
- Ambulance: Welsh
- UK Parliament: Ynys Môn
- Senedd Cymru – Welsh Parliament: Bangor Conwy Môn

Pentre Berw (Welsh pronunciation) is a small village located on the island of Anglesey in north Wales. It lies about 2 miles (3.2 km) south of the county town of Llangefni, and next to Gaerwen.

== Location ==
The A5 and the A55 runs through the village as does the disused Anglesey Central Railway. Indeed, the village's most famous hotel The Holland Arms even had a station named after it. The village is located at the top of a gentle slope on the eastern edge of the Cors Ddyga - named after the 6th century Saint Tegai. A panoramic view of both the marshes Cors Ddyga on the Eastern side and Cors Malltraeth on the Western side of the Afon Cefni or Afon Fawr can be seen from the high ridge called Poncia Berw and Creigiau Coed on either side of the A55 and A5. This ridge running from Cardigan Bay across Anglesey to the North Sea is called the Berw Fault.

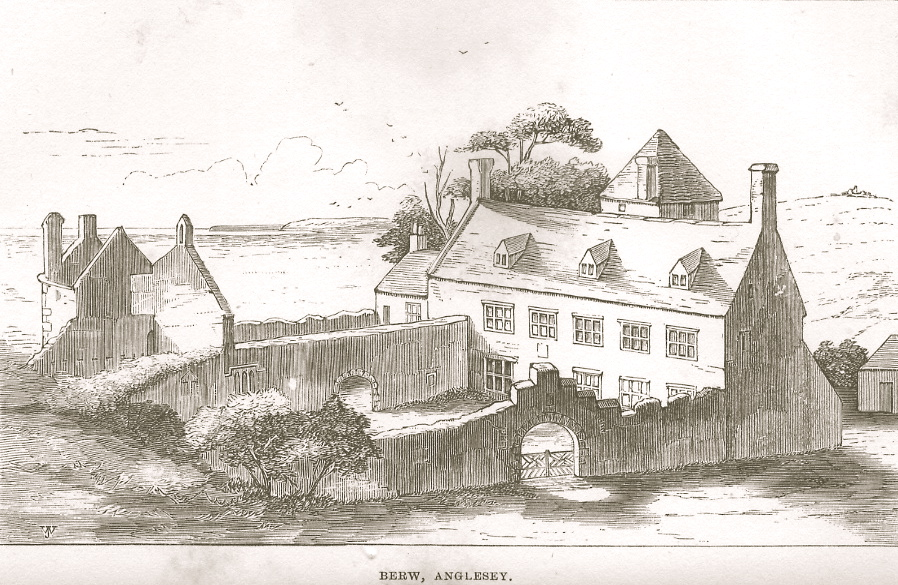
Plas Berw, Anglesey. Engraving from Archaelogia Cambrensis, 1868, p96

== History ==
The name 'Pentre Berw' is thought to either refer to a place where watercress grows, or to the waterfall that is present on the village's steep-sided rock in the rain. The English name for the village, Holland Arms, comes from the Holland family who once lived in the village.

Berw and Esceifiog were termed as medieval townships. Coal was mined at Cors Ddyga. Bell pits were sunk during the Tudor dynasty. From 1700 onwards to 1803 the mining process evolved to deep pits 109 yards deep using large horse winding machines to raise the coal. In 1815 the first steam engine was used to draw the basket and pump out the water by the 'Anglesey Coal Company Ltd.' working the Berw coal. By 1840 the pits were 200 yards deep. Water was extracted by large powerful engines. The Berw stack and colliery buildings are the sole remains of the industrious Coal mines of Anglesey. By 1997 the stack, smithy, store-house, office and cottage of the Berw Colliery was in a ruinous state facing demolition on health and safety reasons. On the eleventh hour Donald Glyn Pritchard secretary of the Pentre Berw Conservation Society sent an SOS- 'Save Our Stack' plea to the Anglesey Antiquarian Society which resulted in CADW within a fortnight sending two inspectors to Pentre Berw to inspect the site. D.G.Pritchard local representative of the AAS testified to the importance of listing the colliery. The site was listed by CADW and the buildings were reinforced and anchored by, RSPB (Cymru), Cadw and Rural Wales Council. The remains of the old Plas Berw was reinforced by the owners and CADW and the old church - Llanfihangel Pentre Berw was also restored and anchored by a grant from CADW. (Cadw report 2012) The colliery lies in RSPB Cors Ddyga which was opened to the public on 18 July 2017.

== Landmarks ==
Plas Berw, a country house which dates back from the early 17th century, is near the village. It is a Grade II listed building. The grounds cover some 8.5 acres (34,000 m^{2}) and include formal gardens and a deer park. The grounds are listed as Grade II* on the Cadw/ICOMOS Register of Parks and Gardens of Special Historic Interest in Wales.

Llanfihangel Ysceifiog (St Michael's church), although ruined, is a good example of a traditional Welsh church. It is situated just north of the village.
