= Holland Arms railway station =

Disused railway station in Anglesey, Wales

Holland Arms
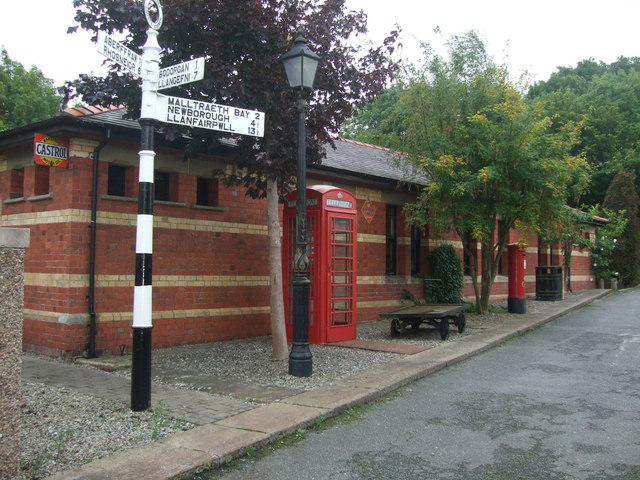

General information
- Location: Pentre Berw, Anglesey; Wales
- Coordinates: 53.2288°N 4.2920°W
- Grid reference: SH470726
- Platforms: 2

Other information
- Status: Disused

History
- Original company: Anglesey Central Railway
- Pre-grouping: London and North Western Railway
- Post-grouping: London, Midland and Scottish Railway

Key dates
- 12 March 1865: Station opened
- 1 July 1908: Red Wharf Bay branch opened
- 22 September 1930: Red Wharf Bay branch closed to passengers
- 3 April 1950: Red Wharf Bay branch closed to freight
- 4 August 1952: Station closed to passengers and freight
Location

Holland Arms railway station was situated on the Anglesey Central Railway line from Gaerwen to Amlwch. Located in the village of Pentre Berw it was known as Holland Arms because of the well known hotel of the same name in the village. It also served as the junction of the Red Wharf Bay branch line from 1908 onwards.

The original platform was on the Down (west) side of the track and had a wooden building containing a waiting room and ticket office on it. This was replaced by a stone building in 1882. There was also a small goods yard on the down side, just north of the platform. In 1908 to serve the new branch line a second platform with stone building was erected on the Up side (east).

When the Red Wharf Bay branch closed to all traffic in 1950, there was little traffic at Holland Arms, and the station closed in 1952, the first on the Anglesey Central line to do so. Only one platform survives and the station building survives too.

Preceding station	Disused railways	Following station
Gaerwen	Anglesey Central Railway	Llangefni
	Historical railways	
Terminus	Red Wharf Bay Branch	Ceint
