= Gaerwen railway station =

Disused railway station in Anglesey, Wales

Gaerwen
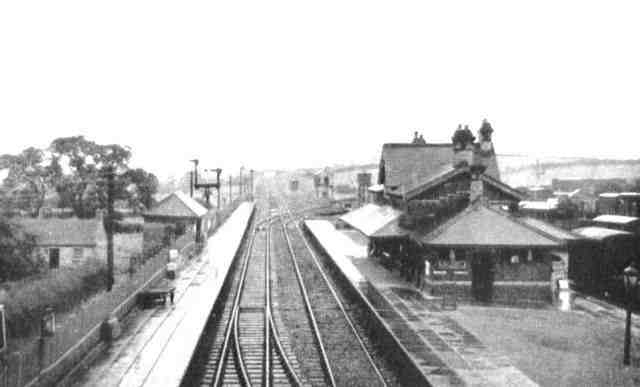
- Gaerwen station in 1936, looking west. The Anglesey Central Railway is seen branching to the right.

General information
- Location: Gaerwen, Anglesey; Wales
- Coordinates: 53.2126°N 4.2702°W
- Grid reference: SH485708
- Platforms: 3

Other information
- Status: Disused

History
- Original company: Chester and Holyhead Railway
- Pre-grouping: LNWR
- Post-grouping: LMS

Key dates
- January 1849: Opened
- 14 February 1966: Closed for passengers
- 1984: closed for goods
Location

Gaerwen railway station is a disused railway station situated on the North Wales Coast Line. It served the village of Gaerwen in Anglesey, North West Wales. It served as a junction for the Anglesey Central Railway and Red Wharf Bay Branch lines.

== History ==
The Chester and Holyhead Railway (C&HR) built the station and it was opened in January 1849. The C&HR was acquired by the London and North Western Railway (LNWR) on 1 January 1859 and the LNWR was merged into the London Midland and Scottish Railway on 1 January 1923.

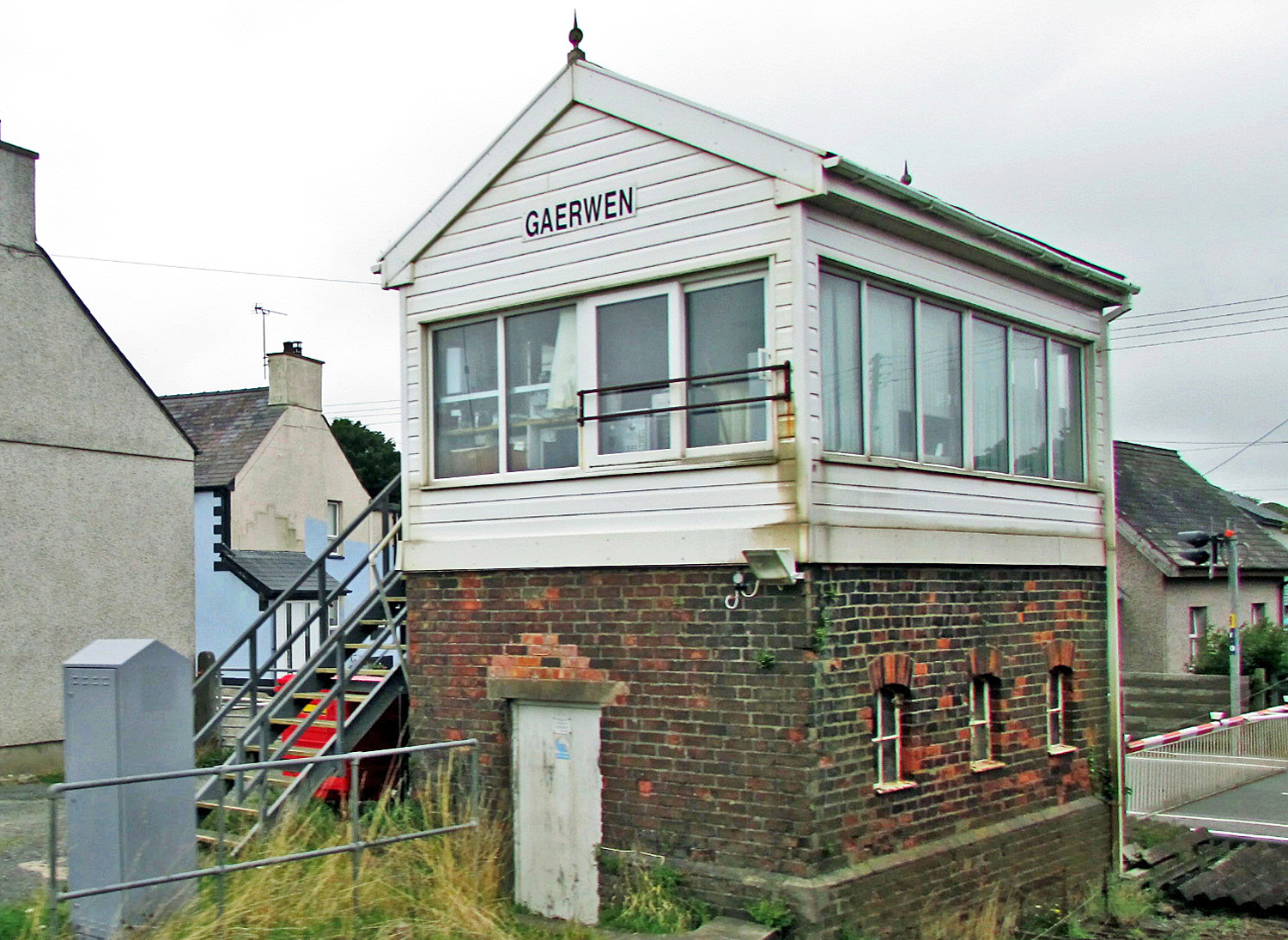
Gaerwen signal box and level crossing in 2016

The main station building was located on the north side of the line, serving eastbound trains. There was a small shelter on the Holyhead bound platform.

The station was closed to passengers by British Railways on 14 February 1966, but the adjoining freight yard remained open for coal and fertiliser traffic before it also closed in 1984.

There were two signal boxes close to the station, one of which remains in use. It is located on the north side of the line at the east end of the old station site and adjacent to a level crossing which is now guarded by lifting barriers. The junction to the Anglesey Central Railway has been disconnected after services were discontinued on the branch line.

In August 2020 a bid was made to the Government's Restoring Your Railway initiative, for funding to carry out a feasibility study to reopen the line between Amlwch and Gaerwen. The bid was successful during the third round of that scheme, and received £50,000 to fund the study. When the bid was submitted, the Welsh government stated that they would match fund any award that was received, raising the value of the award to £100,000.

Preceding station	Historical railways	Following station
Llanfairpwll	North Wales Coast Line	Bodorgan
	Disused railways	
Llanfairpwll	Anglesey Central Railway	Holland Arms
