= Benllech =

Village in Anglesey, Wales

Coordinates: 53.3216°N 4.2257°W

Benllech: Welsh: Benllech
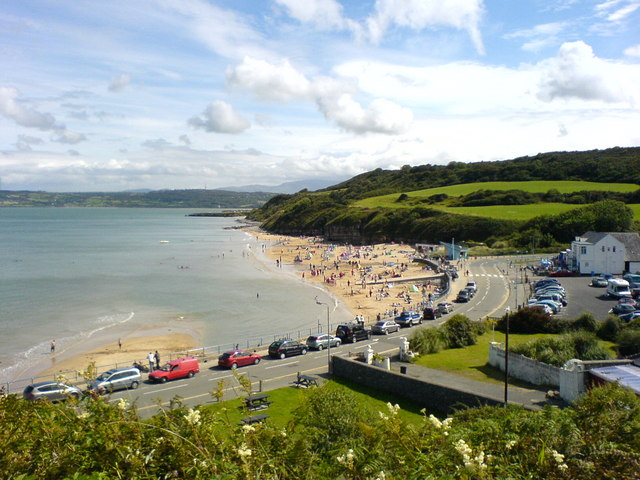
- The sands at Benllech from the headland above Beach Road

- Location within Anglesey
- Population: 3,382
- OS grid reference: SH518828
- Community: Llanfair-Mathafarn-Eithaf
- Principal area: Anglesey
- Preserved county: Isle of Anglesey
- Country: Wales
- Sovereign state: United Kingdom
- Post town: TYN-Y-GONGL
- Postcode district: LL74
- Dialling code: 01248
- Police: North Wales
- Fire: North Wales
- Ambulance: Welsh
- UK Parliament: Ynys Môn
- Senedd Cymru – Welsh Parliament: Bangor Conwy Môn

Benllech (Welsh: [ˈbɛnɬɛχ]) is a village on the Isle of Anglesey in Wales. It is in the community of Llanfair-Mathafarn-Eithaf, which has a population of 3,382. The name of Benllech village had been removed by the time of the 2011 census with the community being listed under Llanfair-Mathafarn-Eithaf with the electoral ward being listed under Llanddyfnan.

== Description ==
The name Benllech is perhaps a mutated form of penllech, literally "head slab" or "head rock", i.e. "capstone" or "head of the rock", or possibly meaning 'on slate', shortened from the Welsh term 'ar ben llech'.

Benllech is a seaside resort and beach holiday destination. The Village also has a range of businesses which include public houses and hotels, camping and caravan sites and several bed and breakfasts. The community has a primary school, Ysgol Goronwy Owen; library, doctors' surgery, chemist, several churches, hardware store, two community centres, police and fire station, tennis court and bowling green, a number of supermarkets (Spar, Cooperative and Tesco Express), restaurants and a petrol service station. Between 1909 and 1950 there was a railway station close to the village which was the terminus of the Red Wharf Bay branch line. The old station house and several railway bridges can be seen along the road approaching the village.

Situated on the outskirts of Benllech lies the Scheduled Monument Pant-Y-Saer enclosed hut group, otherwise known as "Cytiau'r Gwyddelod" (Irish Huts). The monument consists of a complex of mainly circular huts and parts of an associated substantial enclosure wall lying on a slightly elevated limestone plateau area beside an old lane running from Llanbedrgoch to Llanfair Mathafarn Eithaf, about 0.6 km S of the modern settlement of Benllech. The monument is of national importance for its potential to enhance our knowledge of prehistoric/ Romano British settlements. It retains significant archaeological potential, with a strong probability of the presence of associated archaeological features and deposits. The structures themselves may be expected to contain archaeological information concerning chronology and building techniques. The scheduled area comprises the remains described and areas around them within which related evidence may be expected to survive.

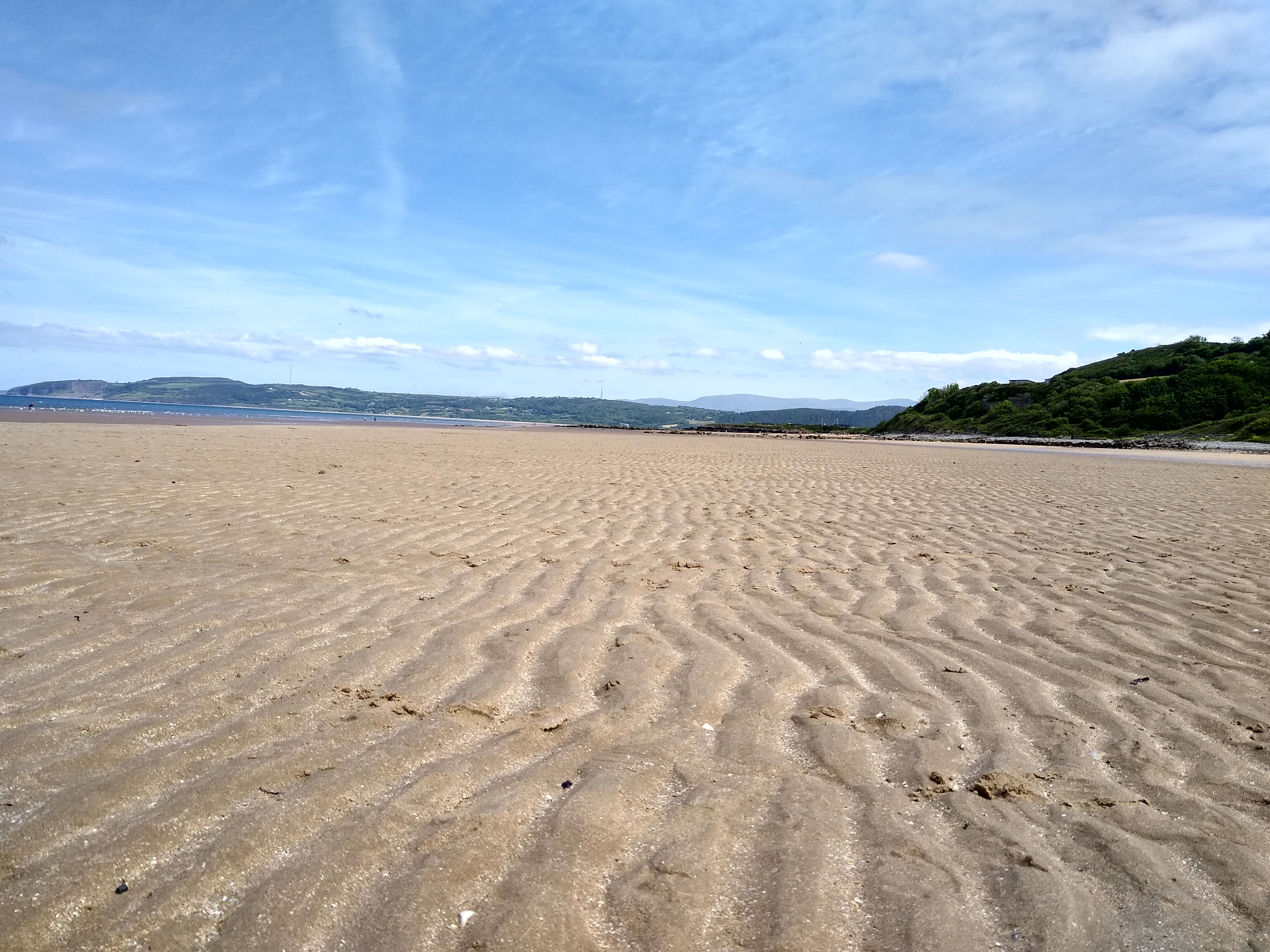
The sandy Beach at Benllech Bay

== Notable residents ==
- William Jones (1675–1749), mathematician who was the first to use the Greek letter π for the ratio of the circumference of a circle to its diameter, was born in the parish of Llanfihangel Tre'r Beirdd
- Goronwy Owen (1723–1769), poet, a native of Llanfair-Mathafarn-Eithaf; Benllech named its village hall and its primary school, Ysgol Goronwy Owen, after him.
- Melville Richards (1910–1973), scholar of Welsh language and literature and Celtic studies, lived and died in Benllech
- Lemmy Kilmister (1945–2015), lead singer, bassist and guitarist of Motörhead, lived here from the age 10 to age 16.
- Carwyn Ellis (born 1973), lead singer for Colorama moved about before his family settled in Benllech.

== Location ==
Benllech is located approximately 8 miles along the A5025 coast road from both bridges which cross from the island to the mainland including via the A55 North Wales Expressway.

The nearest mainline railway station is Llanfairpwll which can be reached in under half an hour on the bus services which run through the village or under 20 minutes by car.

The city of Bangor and the town of Caernarfon are less than half an hour's drive away.

The Royal Mail postal code for the area is LL74.

== Events at Benllech ==
In 1956, West Kirby Sailing Club and the National Firefly Association joined forces to hold one of the largest dinghy sailing championships held up to that time in England or Wales. There were 109 boats competing, with two people in each boat, which meant 218 competitors, there would have been a management team from the Wirral of at least 20 more people. Many stayed in tents and a marquee was erected in which all the competitors were entertained at night and in which they held a dinner and prizegiving on the final night.
