= Red Wharf Bay branch line =

Coordinates: 53.306°N 4.208°W

Overview
- Locale: Anglesey, Wales

History
- Opened: 1 July 1908
- Closed: 3 April 1950

Technical
- Line length: 6 miles 60 chains (10.9 km)
- Track gauge: 4 ft 8 1/2 in (1,435 mm)

The Red Wharf Bay branch line was a standard gauge railway line in Anglesey, Wales, a branch off the Anglesey Central Railway. It opened fully in 1909, but closed to passengers in September 1930. Freight operations continued until 3 April 1950, and the tracks were lifted during the summer of 1953.

== First proposal ==
Anglesey Railway Act 1812
- Act of Parliament
- Parliament of the United Kingdom
- Long title: An Act for making and maintaining a Railway from Penrhynmawr, in the Parish of Llanfihangel Esceisiog, to Redwharf, in the Parish of Llanbedrgoch, in the County of Anglesey; and also a Dock in the Parish of Llanbedrgoch aforesaid.
- Citation: 52 Geo. 3. c. cxlii

Dates
- Royal assent: 9 June 1812

Text of statute as originally enacted

The Anglesey Railway Company, which was established by an act of Parliament, the Anglesey Railway Act 1812, was the first company authorised to build a railway on Anglesey. The line between Pentre Berw to Red Wharf Bay would carry coal and minerals for export by sea. But no evidence has been found that a railway or tram road was ever built.

== Branch line ==
In the late 19th century, the London and North Western Railway (LNWR) was one of the main railways in Britain, and operated almost all services along the North Wales coast. The LNWR developed plans for two branch lines on Anglesey in 1897: one to Beaumaris (which was abandoned), and another to serve the growing tourist trade of Benllech. This line was to connect with the main line at Llanfairpwll, but William Jones MP advocated a connection at Llangefni, on the Anglesey Central Railway (operated by then as a branch line of the LNWR). A compromise was reached with the line connecting at Holland Arms, near Pentre Berw, as authorised by the London and North Western Railway (New Railways) Act 1899 (62 & 63 Vict. c. ccx). The intended terminus was now to be in the nearby village of Red Wharf Bay, giving a slightly shorter route. This was changed by the London and North Western Railway (Wales) Act 1900 (63 & 64 Vict. c. ccxiv) to a crossroads over half a mile (0.8 km) from Red Wharf Bay and a mile (1.6 km) from Benllech, in an attempt to serve both villages. The terminus was called "Red Wharf Bay and Benllech", often abbreviated to "Red Wharf Bay".

A railway (to be called "the Red Wharf Bay Railway") six miles six furlongs and five chains in length wholly situate in the county of Anglesey commencing in the parish of Llanfihangel-Esgeifiog by a junction with the Company's Anglesey Central Railway and terminating in the parish of Llanbedr-Gôch on the south side of the road leading from Saron Chapel by way of Porthllongdy to Red Wharf Bay at a point one hundred and twenty yards or thereabouts north-west of the Ship Inn.
— Section 5(3), London and North Western Railway (New Railways) Act 1899

A deviation and alteration one mile six furlongs one chain and seventy links in length in the parishes of Pentraeth and Llanbedr-Gôch in the county of Anglesey of the Red Wharf Bay Railway authorized by the London and North Western Railway (New Railways) Act 1899 commencing by a junction with the said railway at a point five miles or thereabouts from the commencement of the said railway as shown on the deposited plans referred to in the said Act and terminating at a point thirty-five yards or thereabouts west of the main road from Upper Benllech by way of Croesfryn to Pentraeth and on the south side of the road leading from Llanerchymedd by way of Plas Gwyn and Porth Llongdy to the Min-y-don Hotel Red Wharf Bay.
— Section 5, London and North Western Railway (Wales) Act 1900

The start of construction work was delayed significantly due to the LNWR having financial commitments elsewhere. In 1905 it was decided to build the branch as a light railway instead, to save further money. Work started with a connection at Holland Arms in June 1907, the main contractor being J. Strachan. Some archaeological remains were discovered in a cutting near Pentraeth, including two skeletons, some urns and a 'bronse spear or dagger head'. The portion from Holland Arms to Pentraeth was completed and inspected in June 1908. Services started as far as Pentraeth on 1 July 1908, with the remainder opening on 24 May 1909.

Passenger services on this branch were operated by the LNWR's pioneer autotrain (which the LNWR referred to as a railmotor). This consisted of a rake of two carriages that would be attached to an engine, with a driving compartment and controls built into the rear carriage. When connected to a locomotive adapted for push-pull operation the train could then be operated in either direction without needing to run around. Two carriages were converted from restaurant cars in 1908 for the opening of the line to Pentraeth. Third class accommodation was provided for approximately 80 passengers, with electric lighting and a centre gangway. The autotrain was so successful that many more old carriages were converted for push-pull operation on other branch lines, a pair of which replaced the original railmotor set after opening to Red Wharf Bay. The daily freight service was operated by a regular locomotive.

The first passenger service of the morning started from Bangor, and would return there in the evening. Seven return services to Red Wharf Bay were provided each day, from either Gaerwen (where the Anglesey Central Railway met the main line) or Holland Arms. When not running to Red Wharf Bay the railmotor train was also used on the Anglesey Central Railway: it would operate between Llangefni and Gaerwen while the main branch train was on the round trip from Llangefni to Amlwch and back.

Shortages during the First World War resulted in service cuts. The railmotor set was reduced to one coach around 1914/1915. The seven return trips operated until the summer of 1916 became four in 1917. During the post-war grouping the line became the property of the London, Midland and Scottish Railway, and services were gradually reinstated, returning to seven return services by the summer of 1929. In the winter of 1922/23, a great herring shoal was found on the coast between Moelfre and Benllech. Twelve special trains took five hundred tons of herring from Red Wharf Bay to London, Liverpool, Manchester and other cities, all in the space of two weeks.

== Decline and closure ==
The growth of road motor transport was particularly damaging for the branch: the remote terminus of the railway meant their passengers had a long walk to get to either Benllech or Red Wharf Bay, but buses could operate all the way to the villages. Falling passenger numbers in the 1920s, and the onset of the Great Depression led to the removal of passenger services on 22 September 1930, leaving only the daily goods service. Crosville Motor Services operated the replacement bus service between Benllech and Bangor. This hourly service was more frequent than the train had been, and also removed the need to change trains at Gaerwen (and sometimes Holland Arms too). Some special passenger trains continued to run on Saturdays in the summer months until 1939, as the light buses used could not cope with the density of traffic from Benllech. Once the Menai Suspension Bridge was rebuilt, it could take heavier double-decker buses, and the need for train services disappeared again.

Freight services were reduced to three trains a week in 1944. Due to a lack of wartime maintenance, the post-nationalisation owner British Railways considered closing the line in 1948, but decided to maintain the freight services with an overall speed restriction of 15 mph. It was stated that closure of the branch would result in a savings of £4,307 per annum, compared with the cost of £31,000 to relay the track in order to reopen the branch fully. It was decided to close the branch for a six-month experimental period, transferring the remaining traffic to other stations and to road transport. The branch closed on 3 April 1950 and did not reopen.

With its importance as a junction on the Anglesey Central Railway gone, Holland Arms station was closed to all traffic on 4 August 1952. The track was sold to Messrs James N. Campbell Ltd. of Coatbridge for £19,000, and demolition started on 9 April 1953, with the junction at Holland Arms taken up on 16 October. The sleepers were sold to local people as firewood, but the timber buildings at Pentraeth and Red Wharf Bay remained for some years after.
