= Goronwy Owen (poet) =

Welsh poet (1723–1769)

- Born: 1 January 1723; Llanfair Mathafarn Eithaf, Anglesey, Wales
- Died: 3 July 1769 (aged 46) (Note: The date of Owen's will. His actual death date is unknown but is presumed to be in early July 1769.); Brunswick County, Virginia, British America
- Education: Jesus College, Oxford (no degree)
- Occupations: Poet, clergyman, schoolmaster
- Spouse(s): Elin Hughes (m. c. 1747; her death); Anne Dawson Clayton (m. c. 1758; her death); Joan Simmonds (m. 1763)
- Children: Several; names mostly unrecorded
- Writing career
- Years active: c. 1740–1769
- Genre: Cywydd
- Notable works: "Cywydd y Farn Fawr" "Cywydd molawd Môn" "Awdl Gofuned"
- Movement: Welsh Augustans

Goronwy Owen (1 January 1723 – 3 July 1769 (Note: See note above.)), who wrote under the bardic name Goronwy Ddu o Fon (Goronwy the Black of Anglesey), was an Anglican clergyman and one of the 18th century's most notable and influential figures in Welsh-language literature. He mastered the traditional bardic metres of the cerdd dafod ("tongue craft") and played an important role in the literary and antiquarian flourishing described as the Welsh 18th-century renaissance.

Forced by poor prospects in Britain to emigrate to British Virginia in the late 1750s, Owen joined the faculty of the College of William & Mary. He served as master of the college's grammar school until 1760, when he was apparently terminated for participating in a drunken brawl in Williamsburg. He subsequently became a slave-owning tobacco planter and parson in Lawrenceville, Virginia, where he died in 1769.

After his death, Owen was recognized for his literary genius and his verse was held up by the Gwyneddigion Society as a model for future poets during the late 18th-century revival of the Eisteddfod tradition. His influence upon subsequent Welsh poetry and culture has been extensive.

== Early life and family background ==
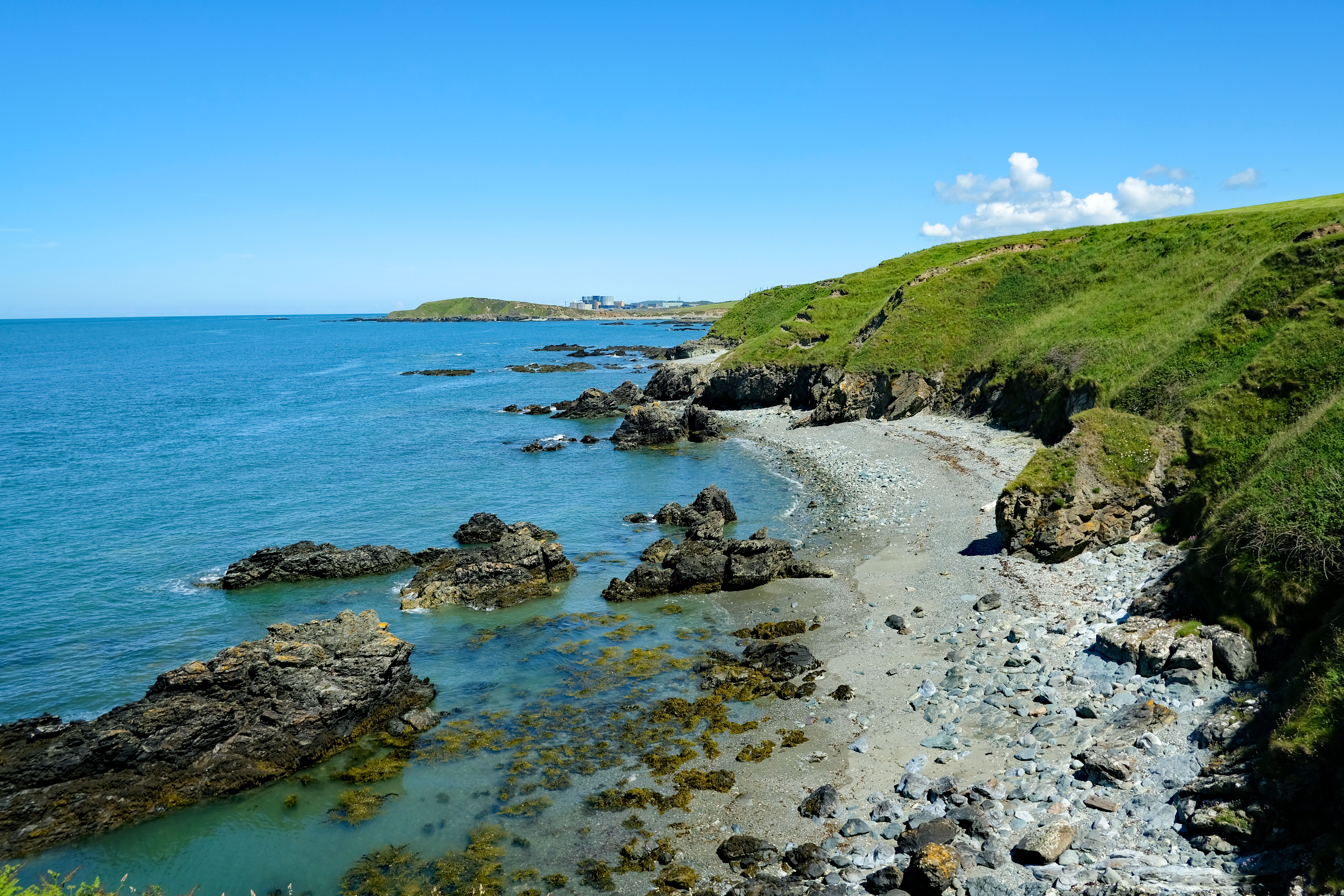
Anglesey, Wales, Owen's home and a subject of his poetry

Owen was born on New Year's Day, 1723, to an impoverished family in the parish of Llanfair Mathafarn Eithaf in Anglesey. Both his grandfather, Goronwy Owen the tinker, and his father, Owen Gronw, had poetic sensibilities and were interested in genealogy. His mother, Siân Parri, had apparently once been a maid at Pentre-eiriannell, home of the prominent Morris family—a connection that would prove to be a decisive factor in Owen's life. Owen apparently came to the attention of family matriarch, Margaret Morris, as a child and developed a close attachment. Owen would later memorialize the late Mrs. Morris in a celebrated elegy.

Owen's childhood at his ancestral home, Y Dafarn Goch, was difficult. The family was desperately poor, and while his mother was apparently a refined woman who instilled in him an appreciation of the Welsh language, his father was reportedly an unpredictable drunkard, as Owen himself would one day be.

== Education ==
At around 10 years old, Owen was sent to attend Griffith Jones' circulating school in Llanallgo. He soon moved to the free school at Pwllheli and then finally in 1737 to Friars School, Bangor. It was at Friars, under the direction of headmaster Edward Bennet and his assistant Humphrey Jones, that Owen learned Latin and Greek and became a classical scholar. He also apparently began to work directly with Margaret Morris' son Lewis, a polymath and poet known by his bardic name Llewelyn Ddu o Fôn, who taught the rules of Welsh poetry. During this period, Owen's long-suffering mother died.

Keen to continue his education, Owen appealed in 1741 to a trustee of the Lewis Charity for a scholarship to Jesus College, Oxford. He was eventually admitted to the college as a servitor, though surviving records suggest that he only resided in the college briefly during the Midsummer Term of 1744. During much of this period as an ostensible student at Oxford, he actually worked as an usher at the free school at Pwellheli (1742-1744) and the school in Denbigh (1745). He appears to have formally exited the university without a degree.

== Career in Britain ==
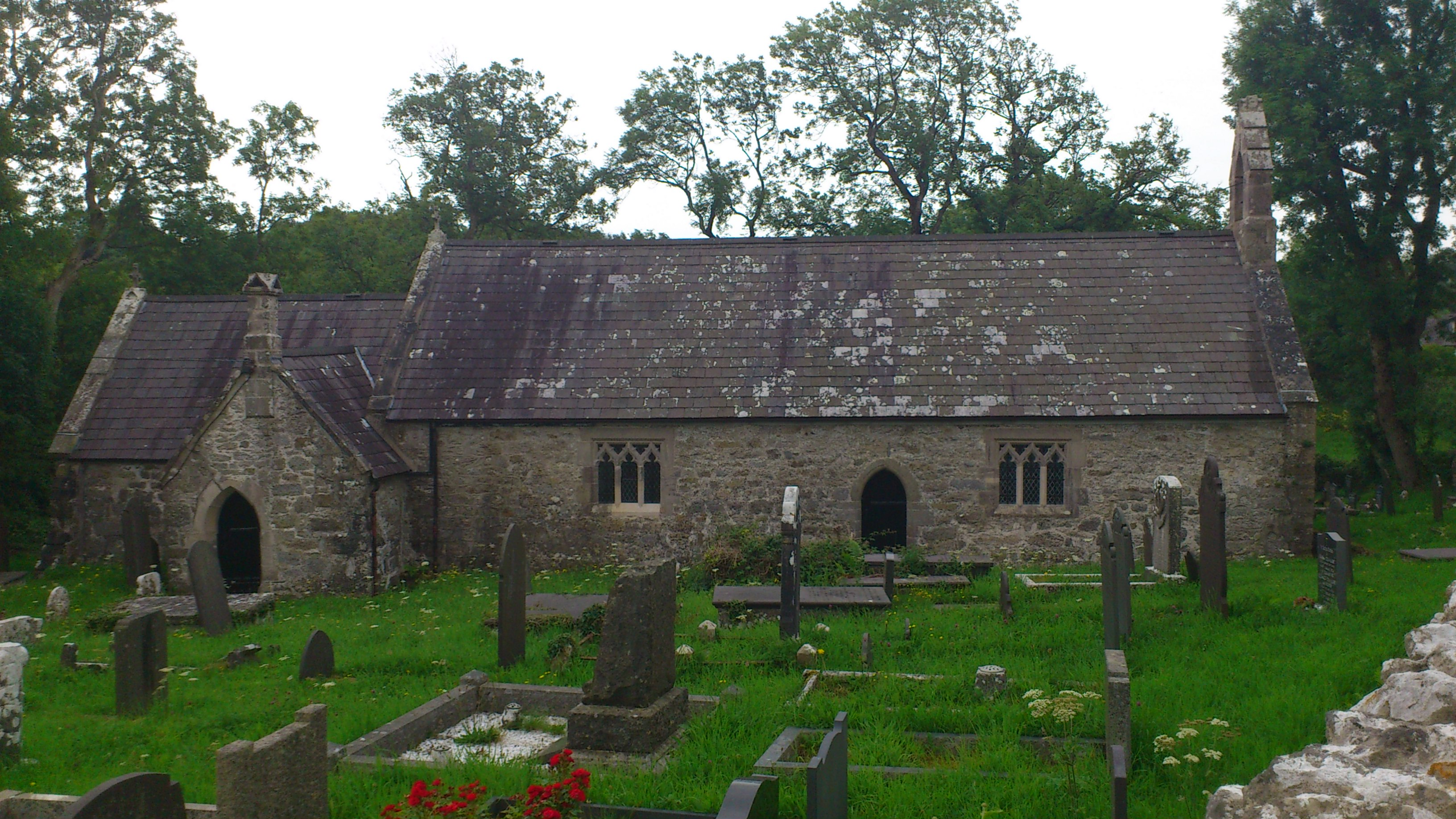
St Mary's Church, Llanfair Mathafarn Eithaf, where Owen was appointed curate in 1746

In January 1746, Owen was ordained and appointed curate of St Mary's Church, Llanfair Mathafarn Eithaf, his home parish. Once more in his beloved Anglesey, he associated with local poets and antiquaries. To his great misfortune, however, he had been granted his position while the Bishop of Bangor was abroad. When the bishop returned to Anglesey, he informed Owen that the curacy had been promised to someone else.

Suddenly unemployed, Owen departed for Oswestry, where, with the support of the Morris family, he was made a master at Oswestry School and curate of nearby Selattyn. He remained in these roles for approximately three years and married Elin Hughes, the daughter of a local ironmonger and alderman, in 1747.

Owen and his wife then moved to Donnington, where he became master of the local grammar school and curate of nearby Uppington close to Shrewsbury, positions he held from 1748 to 1753. Despite the meager salary, Owen and his wife grew their family, welcoming two sons, Robert and Goronwy. During this period, he also mastered the Hebrew language and composed some of his most important cywydd poems, including "Cywydd y Farn Fawr" ("Cywydd of the Great Judgment").

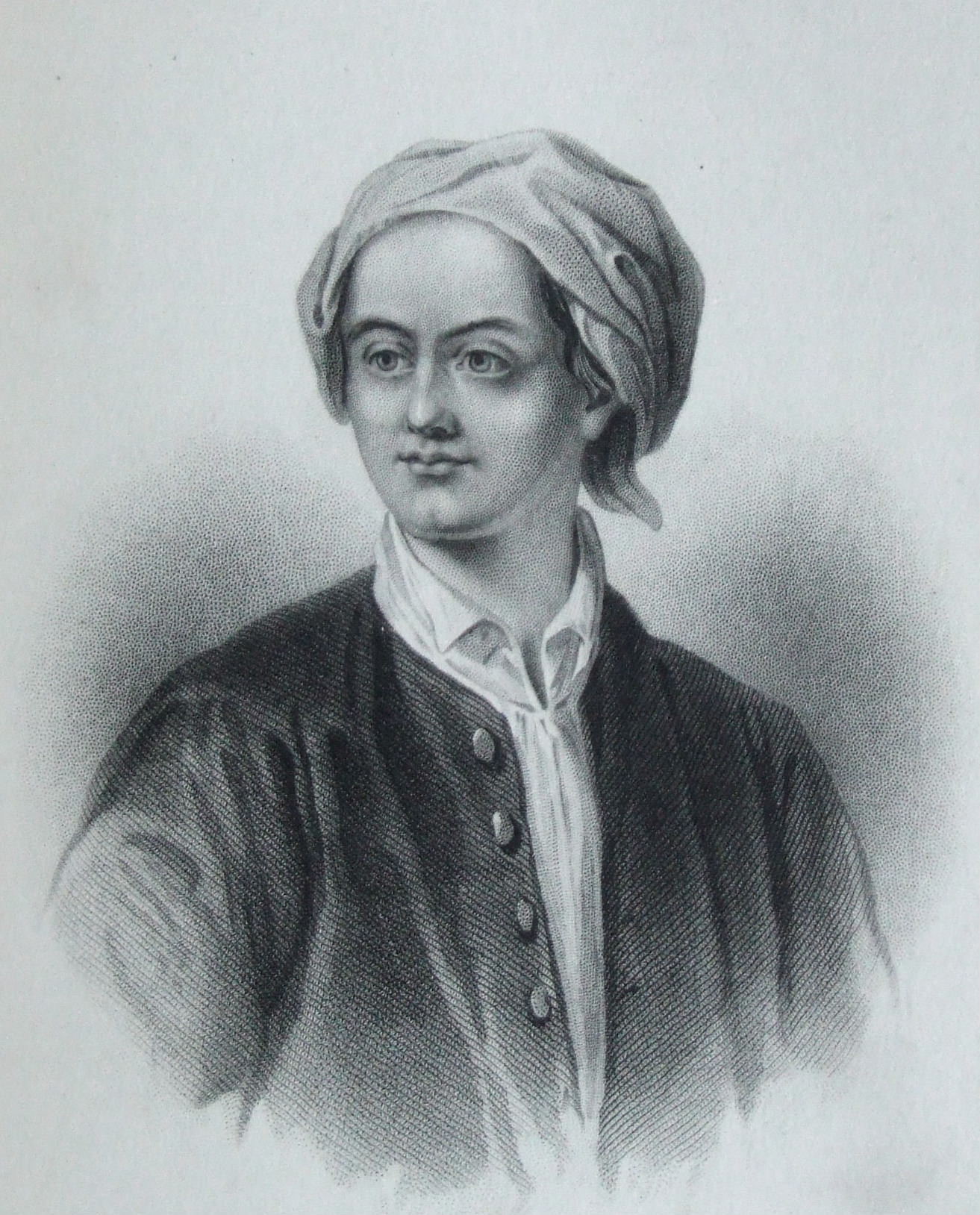
Lewis Morris, Welsh polymath and major patron of Owen

In 1751, Owen also began a celebrated correspondence with his mentor Lewis Morris, who had become a leading figure in the Welsh literary circle that Plaid Cymru co-founder Saunders Lewis would later call the "school of Welsh Augustans." The Morris brothers—Lewis, Richard, and William—had apparently been aware of the precocious Owen since his childhood and became his principal patrons. In a 1752 letter to a contact, Lewis Morris described Owen as "the greatest genius, either of this age, or that ever appeared in our country; and perhaps few other countries can shew [sic] the like of him for universal knowledge."

With William Morris' support, Owen obtained a new curacy and schoolmaster position at Walton, Merseyside near Liverpool in 1753. It was not to last, and during this period the Morris brothers became concerned by reports of Owen's gluttony, drinking, and womanizing. Owen's wife Elin also gained a reputation as a drunk. In 1753, to Owen's great sorrow, their young daughter died after a short illness.

In 1755, Owen moved to London with the aim to secure a paid position as secretary and Welsh-language master for the Honourable Society of Cymmrodorion. Though he completed and published a Welsh translation of the Society's rules in 1755, the organization could not offer him employment. The Society, did, however, help him obtain the curacy of Northolt in Middlesex. It was in Northolt that Owen had his most productive literary period, composing poems like "Cywydd yn ateb Huw'r Bardd Coch o Fôn ("Cywydd in Praise of Anglesey"), the latter of which critics widely recognise as his finest work.

== Emigration to the Colony of Virginia ==
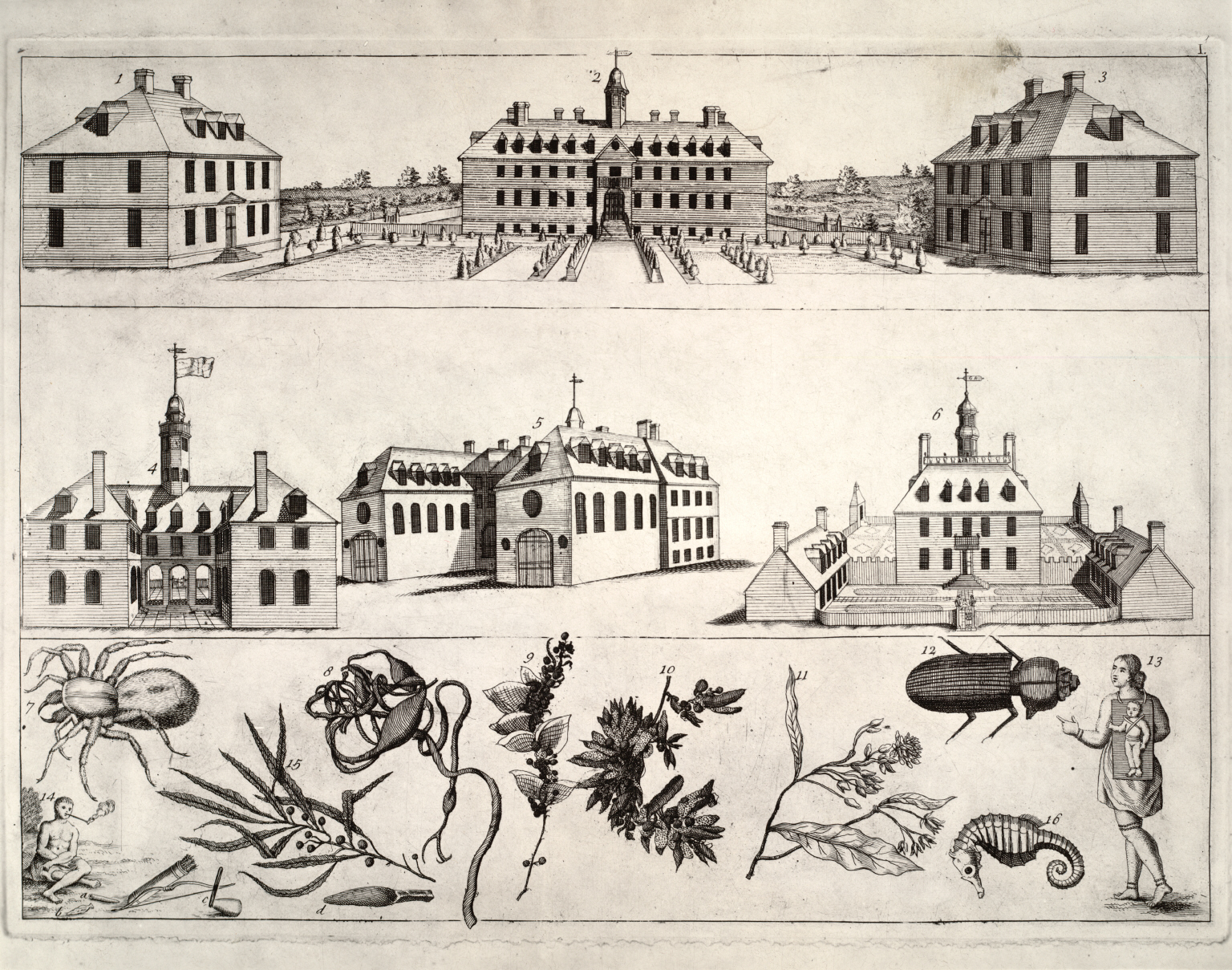
The Bodleian Plate shows the campus of the College of William & Mary (top) in the 1730s, about twenty years before Owen's arrival

=== College of William & Mary ===
For a decade, Owen, his growing family in tow, had bounced from one poorly-paid curacy to another. In 1757, however, the Bishop of London, at the apparent urging of the Earl of Powis, offered the struggling clergyman-cum-poet the life-changing opportunity to become the master of the grammar school of the only royal college in British America, the College of William & Mary. The position came with a 200 pound annual salary—far more than the indigent Owen had ever made. The Owen family departed for the Colony of Virginia, though the crossing, led by a deceitful captain, proved to be a disaster. According to Owen's brother and his patron Richard Morris, Owen composed a now-lost cywydd on the experience of being on the ship when it had to seek shelter in an English port during a severe storm. Before the ship docked on the other side of the Atlantic, several passengers, including Owen's wife and youngest child, died.

In Williamsburg, the colony's capital, the newly-widowed Owen assumed his post at the college under president Thomas Dawson and alongside fellow professors William Small, Jacob Rowe, and Emmanuel Jones. To the Morris brothers' astonishment, Owen, an impoverished Welshman, married President Dawson's sister, the widow Anne Clayton, though she died the same year without issue. His two surviving sons, Robert and Goronwy, enrolled at the college grammar school led by their father. Though little is known of Owen's career at William & Mary, one of his former students would reminisce about him in a letter nearly 40 years later:

"In November 1758, the time I was sent to the Grammar School in the College of William and Mary in Williamsburg, the Rev. Gronovius Owen was master of that school. He was a blunt, hasty-tempered Welshman, and esteemed a good Latin and Greek scholar. He married a Mrs. Clayton, who at that time was the Dame of the College. She shortly died without issue. He had two sons, Robert and Gronovius, who came from England with him. I remember him well, as he was frequently at my father's, and very fond of talking Welsh with my mother.

Rum, which has destroyed more than the sword, was his destruction. He was extremely intemperate; and in one of his merry frolics he and a Mr. Rowe, who was Professor of Moral Philosophy, headed the Collegians in a fray with the young men of the town; for which and other flagrant improprieties they were dismissed from their offices by the visitors.

This, I think, happened in the year 1760. Mr. Rowe returned to England, and Mr. Owen was soon after inducted in a parish in Brunswick Country, Virginia..."

Decades later, Richard Morris, who had been in Britain during this entire period, recalled Owen's dismissal with bitterness, blaming President Dawson, himself a notorious drunk, for driving the poet out of the position that was supposed to be his salvation.

=== Brunswick County ===
After losing his well-remunerated mastership at the College of William & Mary in 1760, Owen was granted a parsonage at St. Andrew's Parish, Brunswick County, Virginia, by lieutenant governor Francis Fauquier. Life in Brunswick County, a heavily-forested and sparsely-populated swath of tobacco country approximately sixty miles southwest of Williamsburg, was a significant departure from what Owen had experienced in Britain or the small but vibrant colonial capital. Nevertheless, he attempted to make the best of it, purchasing a tobacco and cotton plantation in 1761 (and eventually various enslaved individuals) and marrying Joan Simmonds, his third wife in 1763. The couple would have at least three children.

Though not much is known of Owen's life in Brunswick County, surviving letters and accounts suggest that he experienced great isolation and difficulty on Virginia's rural frontier. A court record from 1765 notes that he was found guilty of public drunkenness and the use of profanity, and fined fifty pounds of tobacco. In a 1767 letter his old friend Richard Morris, he lamented the lack of a reliable postal service and the rough character of the local inhabitants. He shared that only his son Robert was left of his "English family"—Goronwy had died—and asked anxiously for information about his old friends in London, noting that his many letters during the eight previous years had received no responses. Notably, he also appended an awdl, Marnwad Lewys Morys Yswain, for his late patron and Richard's brother Lewis Morris, adding the following colophon in Welsh:

"Yr Awdl hon a gânt Goronwy Owen, Person Llanandreas, yn swydd Brunswic, yn Virginia; lle na chlybu, ac na lefarodd hauach ddeng air o Gymraeg, er ys gwell na deng mlynedd." "This Awdl was sung by Goronwy Owen, Parson of St. Andrew's, in the county of Brunswick, in Virginia; a place where had heard, and had spoken, scarcely ten words of Welsh, for more than ten years."

== Death and burial ==
Sometime after receiving this letter in the late 1760s, Richard Morris attempted to rescue Owen from his American exile. He sent a letter to Virginia with the news that he had secured for his old friend the position of Librarian—with a significant salary—for a young and extraordinarily wealthy noble, Sir Watkin Williams-Wynn. Morris also shared news of the flourishing of Welsh printing and inquired after a copy of Diddanwch Teuluaidd ("A Seemly Diversion"), an anthology featuring Owen's collected poems, that he had given to a Virginia-bound missionary priest to bring to Owen. On the outside of his letter, Morris wrote, "If the Revd. Mr. Owen is dead, I pray a line from the person who opens this, with some account of him and his family, directed to Mr. Morris, Navy Office, London."

He never received a reply. It is possible that by the time the letter reached Virginia Owen was in fact already deceased. He had died in early July 1769 and was buried on his plantation six miles northeast of Lawrenceville.

== Poetry and literary legacy ==
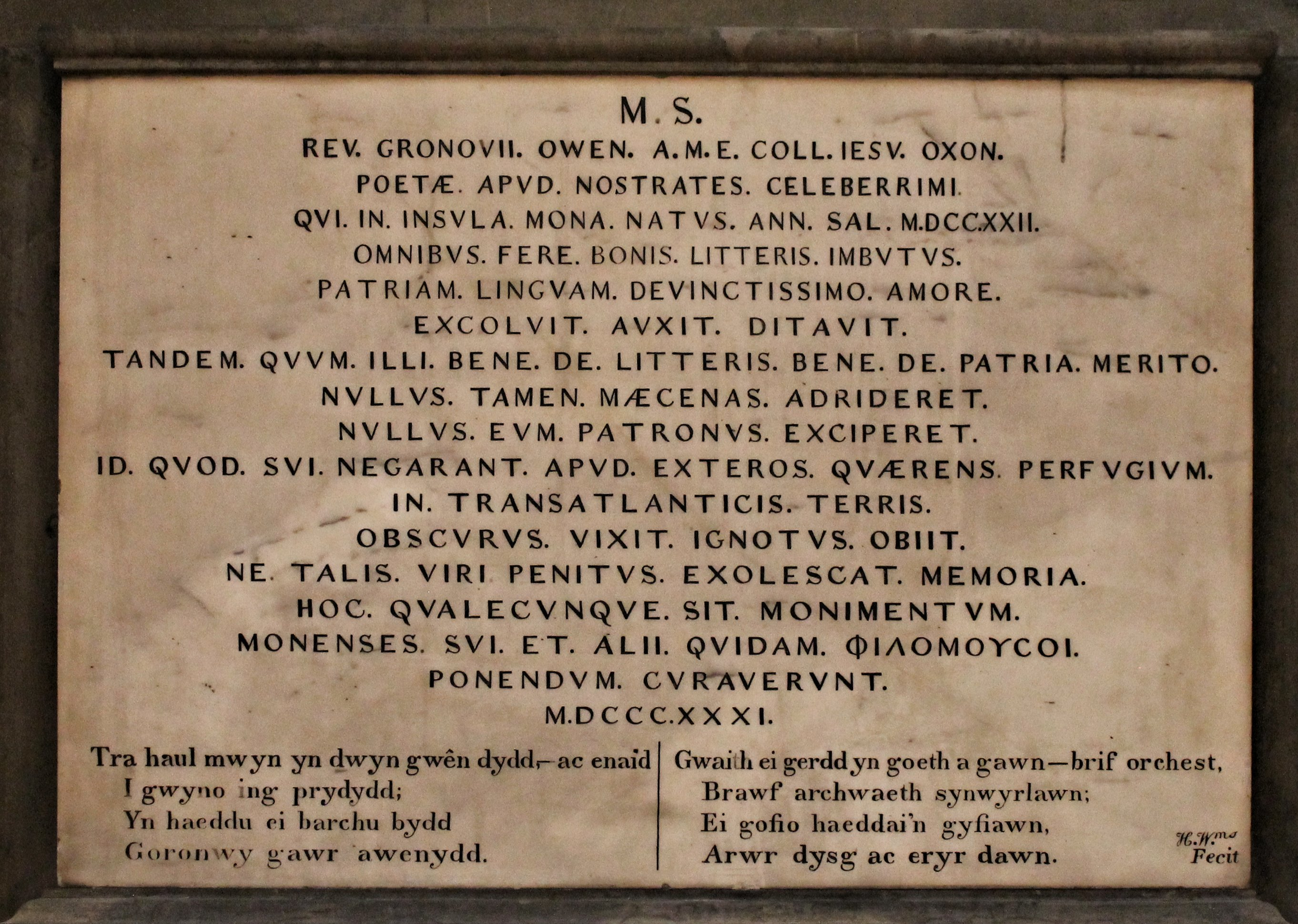
A memorial to Owen, installed in the Bangor Cathedral in 1831

In Welsh, Owen signed his name as "Gronwy," "Gronwy Ddu" ("Gronwy the Black"), and "Grownwy Ddu o Fon" ("Gronwy the Black of Anglesey"). His known corpus is relatively small, with perhaps less than forty surviving poems, including the highly-technical and sophisticated cywyddau, awdlau, and englynion, as well as a few Latin compositions. He often expressed the desire to compose an epic work of Christian poetry which would be the equal of John Milton's Paradise Lost. He felt, however, that the rules of Welsh poetry in strict metre prevented him from doing so.

Though many of Owens' poems were published in the 1760s, it is doubtful that he, then languishing in the backwoods of colonial Virginia, ever saw his work in print. Still, those that who read his verse and corresponded with him recognised him as an exceptional literary talent and brilliant classicist. Beilby Porteus, Bishop of London from 1787 to 1809, described Owen as "the most finished writer of Latin since the days of the Roman Emperors." His reputation grew quickly after his death, and by the 1790s, the London-based Gwyneddington Society, which had spurred a revival of the Eisteddfod literary tradition, was inviting poets to submit works for a competition that identified Owen's work as the model of exemplary Welsh verse. The correspondence between Owen and the Morris brothers would also later be celebrated as a foundational text in Welsh literary criticism.

Since the early 19th century, Owen has been esteemed as a giant of Welsh literature and made the subject of various tributes. In 1831, a memorial tablet for him was erected by self-described "lovers of the Muses" in the Bangor Cathedral. In 1923, the Honourable Society of Cymmrodorion installed a plaque in memory of Owen in St. Mary's Church, Northholt, and in 1957, a second one was put in the Earl Gregg Swem Library of the College of William & Mary. Both plaques conclude with the same line written by Owen himself:

"Dyn didol dinod ydwyf | ac i dir mon estron wyf" "I am an isolated man of no note | and to the land of Anglesey I am a stranger"

Today, in his beloved Anglesey, Owen is the namesake of a primary school (Ysgol Goronwy Owen) and a football club (Bro Goronwy F.C.). His statue adorns the side of the Main Arts building at Bangor University. At the College of William & Mary, the Goronwy Owen Prize in Poetry is awarded annually to an undergraduate for the best collection of poems.

== Bibliography ==
=== Published works ===
- Dewisol Ganiadau yr Oes Hon (1759). ("Selected songs of this age") Anthology. Includes a few of his poems.
- Diddanwch Teuluaidd (1763, 1817). ("A seemly diversion") Anthology in three parts. Includes most of his poems together with works by Lewis Morris and Huw Huws.
- Corph y Gainc (1810). Selections.
- John Jones (ed.), Gronoviana (Llanrwst, 1860). Complete poems and a selection of literary correspondence.
- Rev. Robert Jones (ed.), Poetical Works of Goronwy Owen (1876).
- Isaac Foulkes (ed.), Holl Waith Barddonol Goronwy Owen (1878). Complete poems.
- Isaac Foulkes (ed.), Gwaith Goronwy Owen (1902). Essentially a new edition of the above.
- W. J. Gruffydd (ed.), Cywyddau Goronwy Owen (1907). Annotated edition of the poems.
- J. H. Davies (ed.), The Letters of Goronwy Owen (1924).
- Dafydd Wyn Wiliam (ed.), Llythyrau Goronwy Owen (The Letters of Goronwy Owen) (2014). Annotated edition of the Letters.

Individual poems have also been published in numerous anthologies and other sources, including The Oxford Book of Welsh Verse.

=== Biographies and studies ===
- Bedwyr Lewis Jones, in Gwŷr Môn (1979), ed. Bedwyr Lewis Jones, Cyngor Gwlad Gwynedd. ISBN 0-903935-07-4
- Alan Llwyd, Goronwy Ddiafael, Goronwy Ddu. Cofiant Goronwy Owen 1723-1769 (Cyhoeddiadau Barddas, 1997).
- W. D. Williams, Goronwy Owen (Cardiff, 1951).
