= Y Dafarn Goch =

Place in Llanfair Mathafarn Eithaf, Anglesey, Wales

Y Dafarn Goch in the parish of Llanfair Mathafarn Eithaf, Anglesey, Wales was the birthplace of the poet Goronwy Owen (Goronwy Ddu o Fôn) (1723–69).
