= St Peter's Church, Llanbedrgoch =

Church in Anglesey, Wales

Coordinates: 53.294627°N 4.237851°W

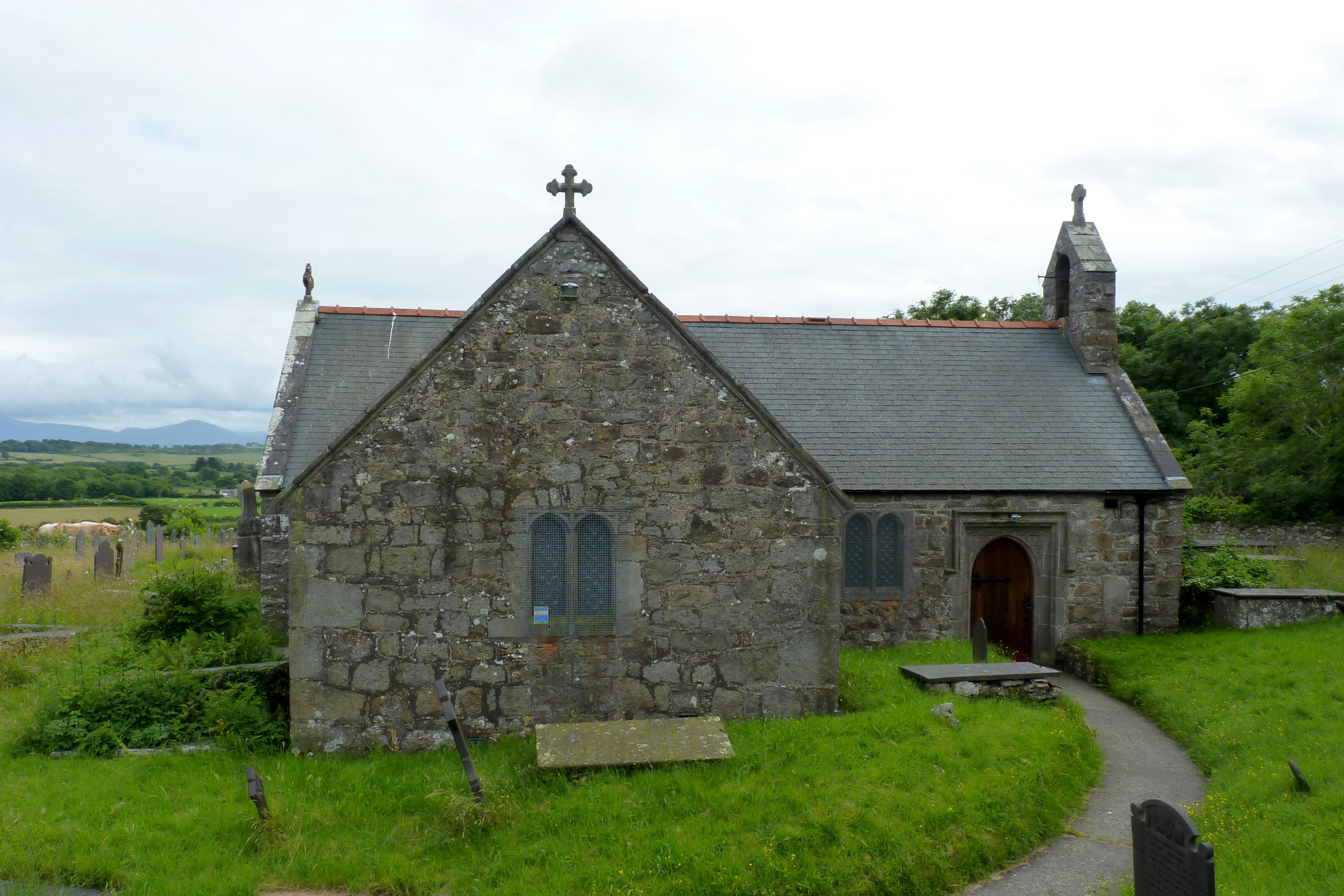
- St Peter's Church, showing the north transept (left) and north door (right)

- Location in Anglesey
- Location: Llanbedrgoch, Anglesey
- Country: Wales
- Denomination: Church in Wales

History
- Status: Parish church
- Dedication: St Peter

Architecture
- Functional status: Active
- Heritage designation: Grade II*
- Designated: 12 May 1970
- Architectural type: Church
- Style: Medieval

Specifications
- Length: 23 ft 6 in (7.2 m) (nave)
- Materials: Rubble masonry

Administration
- Province: Province of Wales
- Diocese: Diocese of Bangor
- Archdeaconry: Bangor
- Deanery: Tindaethwy and Menai
- Parish: Llanfair Mathafarn Eithaf with Llanbedrgoch with Pentraeth

Clergy
- Rector: The Venerable R P Davies

St Peter's Church, Llanbedrgoch, is a small medieval parish church near the village of Llanbedrgoch in Anglesey, north Wales. The oldest parts of the building date from the 15th century; it was extended in the 17th century and restored twice in the 19th century. The doorway is decorated with carvings of two human heads, one wearing a mitre. The church contains a reading desk made from 15th-century bench ends, one carved with a mermaid holding a mirror and comb.

The church is still used for worship by the Church in Wales, as of 2013, and is one of three in a group of parishes. It is a Grade II* listed building, a national designation given to "particularly important buildings of more than special interest", because of its "substantial medieval fabric".

== History and location ==
St Peter's Church is in a rural location along a narrow lane near the village of Llanbedrgoch in Anglesey, north Wales. The village itself is about 4 miles (6.4 km) from Llangefni, the county town. Built on raised ground inside a churchyard, access to which is through a lychgate, the church is dedicated to St Peter. The village takes its name from the church; the Welsh word llan originally meant "enclosure" and then "church", and "‑bedr" is a modified form of the saint's name, "Pedr" in Welsh.

The date of the earliest church on the site of St Peter's is unknown. The chancel and the nave are thought to date from the 15th century, and a transept was added to the east end of the church probably in the 17th century, to form a cross groundplan. The church was restored twice in the 19th century, in 1840 and again in 1885; the 1840 restoration was partially funded by a grant of £20 from the Bangor Diocesan Church Building Society.

St Peter's is still used for worship by the Church in Wales. It is one of three churches in the combined benefice of Llanfair Mathafarn Eithaf with Llanbedrgoch with Pentraeth, (Note: The others are St Mary's, Llanfair Mathafarn Eithaf, and St Mary's, Pentraeth.) and is within the deanery of Tindaethwy and Menai, the archdeaconry of Bangor and the Diocese of Bangor. As of 2013, the rector is the Venerable R. P. Davies, who is also the Archdeacon of Bangor.

== Architecture and fittings ==
St Peter's is built from rubble masonry, with large stones at the corners of the transepts and sandstone dressings around some of the apertures. The roof is made of slate; the stone bellcote at the west end has one bell and is topped with a cross. The nave and chancel are the oldest parts of the building. The nave measures 23 feet 6 inches by 14 feet (7.16 by 4.3 m); the chancel, which is separated from the nave by a single step, measures 14 feet 6 inches by 4 feet (4.42 by 1.2 m). The sanctuary within the chancel is raised by a further step and has a rail around it. The vestry is at the west end of the nave. The transepts to the north and south of the chancel are square in plan, their sides and endsmeasuring approximately 14 feet 6 inches (4.42 m). The western end of the north wall of the nave has a 15th-century pointed arch doorway set in a square frame, with decorative patterns in the stonework around the door and carved heads on either side of the frame; the head to the left of the frame wears a mitre. A doorway in the opposite wall of the nave, probably also dating from the 15th century, was partially replaced in the 19th century with a window.

The window on the north wall of the nave is to the east of the door, and was added in the 19th century. It has two rounded lights (sections of window separated by mullions), in similar style to the two-light 17th-century window in the north wall of the north transept. The second window in the transept, in the east wall, is from the 19th century. The two windows in the south transept, in the south and east walls, are both from the 17th century, and are square-headed with two lights. The window in the east wall of the chancel is from the 19th-century and has three lights topped with stonework trefoils. It has an external hoodmould (a decorative stone border) around the top. The glass of all the windows is patterned, and some is coloured; the coloured glass is used in the same way as in other Anglesey churches whose 19th-century restorations were aided by Henry Stanley, 3rd Baron Stanley of Alderley, an Anglesey nobleman who converted to Islam.

The exposed roof timbers date from the 19th century. Most of the fittings date from the middle of the 19th century, with the exception of a reading desk made from two 15th-century bench ends, one of which is carved with a mermaid holding a comb and a mirror. The desk had previously been in St Eilian's Church, Llaneilian. A survey in 1937 by the Royal Commission on Ancient and Historical Monuments in Wales and Monmouthshire also noted the octagonal font of uncertain date, two 17th-century memorials inside the church, and some memorials from the 17th and 18th centuries outside it.

A survey of church plate within the Bangor diocese in 1906 recorded an Elizabethan silver chalice from about 1575, just over 6 inches (150 mm) tall, and a plain silver paten and a silver flagon both dated 1904–05. The mark "IL" within a shield on the chalice probably refers to John Lynglay, an Elizabethan goldsmith from Chester; it was one of four chalices in the diocese to be marked in this way. The survey also noted that the church no longer had the pewter flagon and dish recorded in the church terriers between 1788 and 1821.

== Churchyard ==
The churchyard contains two Commonwealth war graves, of a Royal Navy sailor of World War I and an ATS officer of World War II.

== Assessment ==
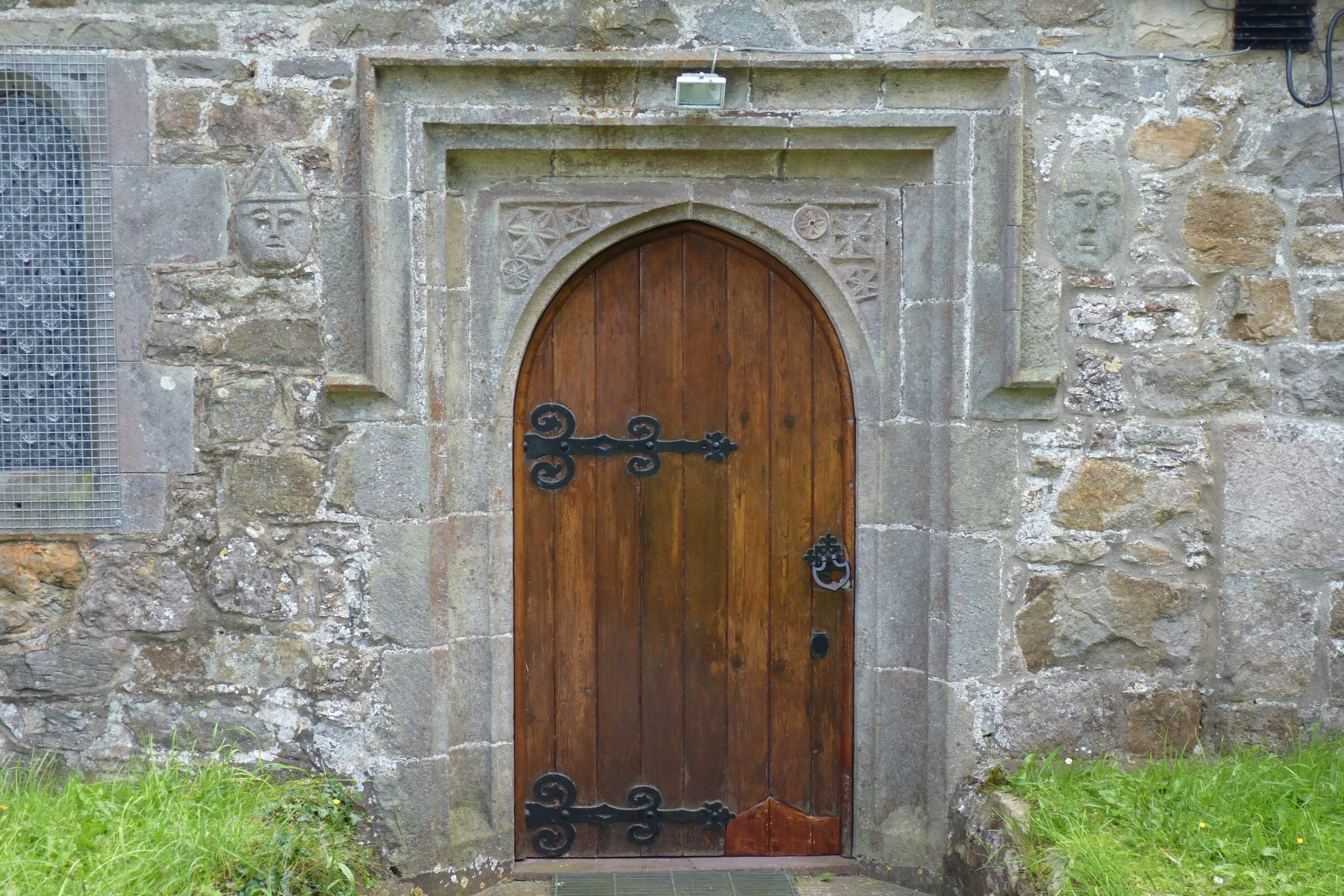
The north door, decorated with carvings and two heads

The church has statutory protection from unauthorised alteration as it was designated a Grade II* listed building – the second-highest of the three grades of listing, recognising "particularly important buildings of more than special interest" – on 12 May 1970. Cadw, the Welsh Government body responsible for the built heritage of Wales and the inclusion of Welsh buildings on the statutory lists, describes St Peter's as "a good rural church retaining substantial medieval fabric".

Writing in 1833, before the 19th-century restorations, the antiquarian Angharad Llwyd described St Peter's as "a small beautiful cruciform structure, with a handsome east window, situated on a rocky eminence, in a distant and exposed part of the parish". Writing in 1847, in between the two restorations, the clergyman and antiquarian Harry Longueville Jones said that St Peter's was the only old building in the parish, and that the "rude execution" of the north doorway "will not escape notice." He said that the chancel window was of the same design as that in the Old Church of St Nidan, Llanidan. He also noted that the font was "anomalously placed near the entrance of the chancel".

The Welsh politician and church historian Sir Stephen Glynne visited the church in December 1849, and observed that the transepts were "as usual, awkward and sprawling", and were "much out of proportion to the short chancel and insignificant nave." He described the east window as a late example of the Middle Pointed style, "of a character very frequent in Anglesey."
