= David Jones (antiquary, fl. 1750–1780) =

Welsh antiquarian

- Occupations: Poet and antiquarian

David Jones (fl. 1750–1780) was a Welsh poet and antiquary.

== Biography ==
Jones, otherwise known as Dafydd Sion Dafydd and Dewi Fardd, was presented by the poet Lewis Morris [q. v.] with a small supply of type, and set up as a printer at Trevriw, Carnarvonshire. He wrote much himself, but owing to his limited supply of type was at first compelled to print his books at other presses. In 1745 ‘Histori Nicodemus,’ a somewhat poor translation by Jones of ‘Nichodemus Gospell’ (Ames, Typogr. Antiq. 1812, ed. ii. 144), was printed at Wrexham, while some of his other publications were issued at Shrewsbury and Chester. He collected and edited a volume of previously unpublished Welsh poetry under the title of ‘Blodeugerdd Cymru,’ Shrewsbury, 1759; 2nd ed. Shrewsbury, 1779, 12mo; 3rd ed. Holywell, 1823, 8vo. In this he has included some of his own poems, which do not possess any merit. He was more successful as a collector of ancient manuscripts. Some of these, consisting of prose and verse, he published in ‘Y Cydymaith Dyddan,’ Chester, 1766, 8vo. A portion of his manuscript collection is in the British Museum (Add. MSS. 9864–7, 14989, and 15046; cf. 14973–4 and 15012). Another portion of his collection was purchased by the Rev. H. D. Griffith of Carnarvon, and was largely used by the editors of ‘Myvyrian Archæology.’
