= Richard Morris (editor) =

Welsh writer and editor (1703–1779)

Richard Morris (2 February 1703 – December 1779) was a Welsh writer and editor, a younger brother of Lewis Morris.

== Life ==
Morris was born in Penrhos Lugwy, Anglesey, one of four notable brothers whose surviving correspondence is a valuable record of the time. They were brought up by Morris Prichard and Margaret Owen. The brothers were writers and collectors of literature and patrons of the contemporary poet Goronwy (or Gronwy) Owen.

Richard Morris set off for London on 1 August 1722, and only ever returned to Anglesey once. By 1728 he was well known in the London Welsh community, and was a steward at the annual St David's Day dinner of the "Society of Antient [sic] Britons". Richard got married in 1729. His brother Lewis came to London to work soon after he did; their brother William visited them in 1730, and their youngest brother John, who was a sailor, in 1735.

In 1734 Richard got into difficulty after standing surety for a friend who went bankrupt; as a result he spent some time in the King's Bench Prison. His brother Lewis blamed this on the way "he neglected his wife and children to help others". Eventually he was given a loan by Owen Meyrick of Bodorgan, who seems to have helped him back into employment. His wife died in 1740, and he married again the following year. From one of his marriages he had a daughter called Marian.

By the 1740s, Morris was being employed by the Bishop of Bangor as a proof-reader for Welsh pamphlets. He also obtained a post as a clerk in the navy office, where he ultimately became chief clerk of foreign accounts in 1757. His second wife died in 1750 and he married again, his third wife's name being Elizabeth. He is believed to have had ten children from this third marriage, two of whom were daughters named Angharad and Margaret. A son, Richard (born 1762), was sent to be brought up by an aunt in Wales.

In the 1760s he is recorded as selling books from his place of work, on behalf of Thomas Pennant, who shared his profits with the Welsh charity school in Clerkenwell, London. He had a house in Stepney, but in 1763 he moved his family to the precincts of the Tower of London, close to where his office was.

While working at the Navy Office, Morris became close friends with fellow clerk Wil(l)iam Parry, who was also from Anglesey and would become secretary to the Cymmrodorion Society in 1755. Parry and Morris worked closely together in the Department of Foreign Accounts. Richard's eldest brother, Lewis Morris, died in 1765, and in the following year Richard Morris made his only visit home, when he called on his brother Lewis's widow at Penbryn.

After Elizabeth's death in 1772, Richard Morris married for a fourth time, to a Stepney widow named Mary Major. As his health began to fail, he was allowed to take lodgings at the Welsh School in Gray's Inn Road.

== Work ==
Morris was involved in preparing the editions of the Welsh Bible printed in 1746 and 1752. These were issued by the Society for Promoting Christian Knowledge, in answer to the appeal of Griffith Jones of Llanddowror, Carmarthenshire, for a supply of bibles for his travelling free schools. Rhisiart Morys not only supervised the orthography, but added tables of Jewish weights and measures. He also issued an illustrated translation into Welsh of the Book of Common Prayer.

He was a leading figure among London Welshmen, and on the establishment of the original Cymmrodorion Society in September 1751 became its president. He employed Goronwy Owen to translate the rules of the society into Welsh. Sir William Jones employed Morris himself to catalogue the library of Moses Williams. His son, Richard, was involved in the posthumous publication of Lewis Morris's Celtic Remains.

== Death and legacy ==
After long service, Morris was able to retire, and he died at the Tower of London in 1779. William Parry was named as the executor of his will, but predeceased him.

Richard Morris was buried at the church of St George in the East, alongside his third wife Elizabeth and some of their children. He left his collection of manuscripts to the Welsh School and they were later given to the British Library. Following his death, the Society of Cymmdodorion offered a silver medal for the best elegy on its late President; the contest has been as a forerunner of the National Eisteddfod of Wales.
