= Pant-y-Saer Burial Chamber =

Neolithic dolmen in Anglesey, Wales

Coordinates: 53.3175°N 4.2397°W

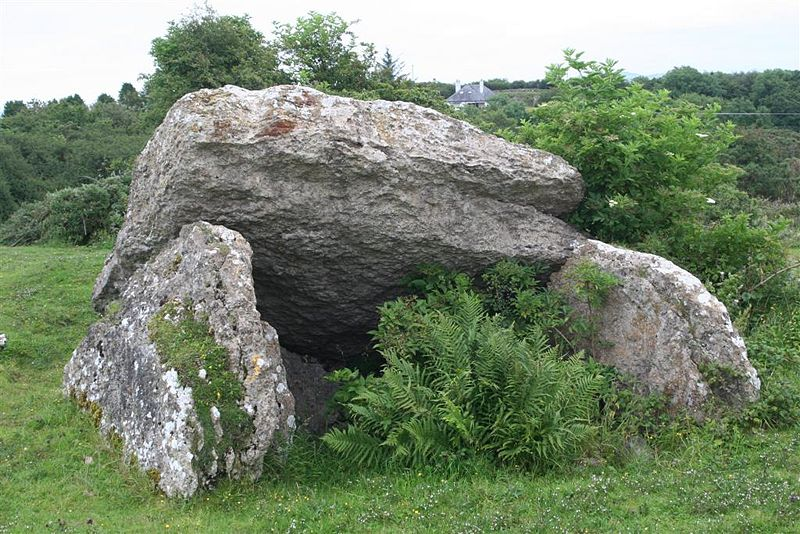
Pant-y-Saer Burial Chamber

Pant-y-Saer is a Neolithic dolmen near the small town of Benllech in Anglesey, Wales. This burial chamber is partially collapsed with the massive capstone resting on the ground at one end. The remains of fifty-six people who were buried here have been found during excavations.

== Burial chamber ==
Pant-y-Saer Burial Chamber is located on a scrubby hilltop site near Benllech in the parish of Llanfair Mathafarn Eithaf. The capstone is large, measuring about 3 m (10 ft) in length and breadth, with a thickness of 0.5 m (1.6 ft); it has partially collapsed and rests with one end on the ground and the other end supported by two upright stones, one on the north side and the other on the south. These have rather rounded tops which may be why the capstone slid off. The chamber was originally covered with a cairn or mound, of which traces remain. Excavations show that the cairn was walled at the front and may have been extended for some way at the back. There is a curved forecourt adjoining the northern upright, and the placement of an offering pot at the far side of this suggest that this was the main front of the structure.

Investigations of the site in 1875 unearthed the remains of two people and these were removed. Further investigation in 1912 revealed a lower level to the chamber, in which were the remains of 54 people of all sexes and ages, including nine new-born babies. The bodies would not have all fitted in the chamber at one time, so it seems likely that the grave was repeatedly reopened to accommodate more bodies.

Pant-y-Saer Burial Chamber is a scheduled ancient monument. The Royal Commission on the Ancient and Historical Monuments of Wales curates the archaeological, architectural and historic records for this site. Included in the archives are many digital images of the site, NMR site files, Cadw guardianship records, colour photographs, black and white photographs, aerial photographs and scanned images.
