= St Mary's Church, Llanfair Mathafarn Eithaf =

Coordinates: 53.32182°N 4.243464°W

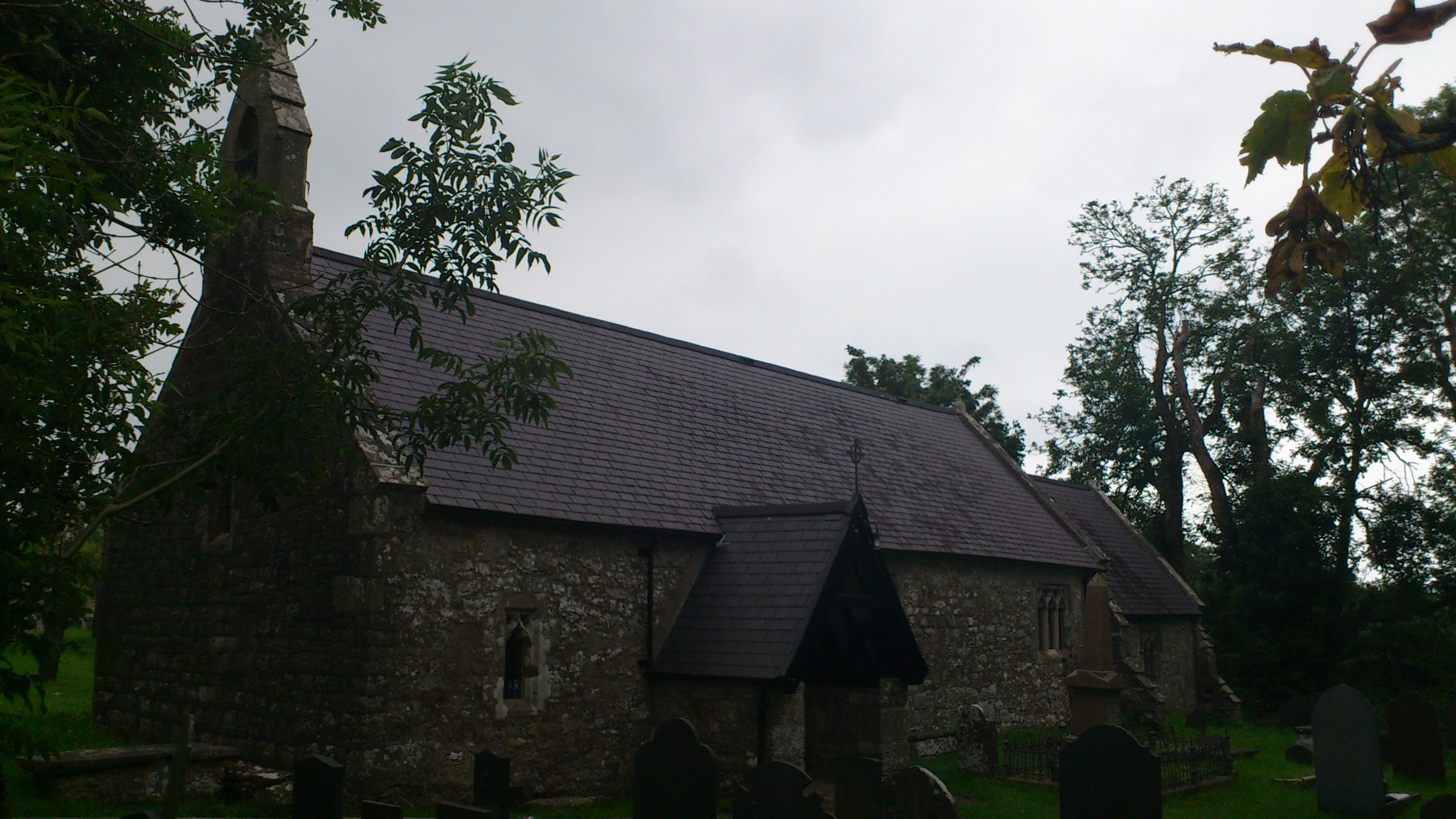
- The south side of the church

- location in Anglesey
- Location: Llanfair-Mathafarn-Eithaf, Anglesey
- Country: Wales
- Denomination: Church in Wales
- Website: Parish website

History
- Status: Church
- Founded: 14th century
- Dedication: St Mary

Architecture
- Functional status: Active
- Heritage designation: Grade II*
- Designated: 12 May 1970
- Architect: Henry Kennedy (1847 renovations)
- Style: Medieval

Specifications
- Length: 52 ft 6 in (16.0 m)
- Materials: Rubble masonry

Administration
- Province: Province of Wales
- Diocese: Diocese of Bangor
- Archdeaconry: Bangor
- Deanery: Tindaethwy and Menai
- Parish: Llanfair Mathafarn Eithaf with Llanbedrgoch with Pentraeth

Clergy
- Rector: Venerable R P Davies

St Mary's Church, Llanfair Mathafarn Eithaf is a small medieval church in Anglesey, north Wales. The earliest parts of the building, including the nave and the north doorway, date from the 14th century. Other parts, including the chancel and the east window, date from the 15th century. It is associated with the Welsh poet and clergyman Goronwy Owen, who was born nearby and served as curate here. He later travelled to America to teach at The College of William & Mary, Virginia.

The church is still in use for worship, as part of the Church in Wales, as one of three churches in the combined parish of Llanfair Mathafarn Eithaf with Llanbedrgoch with Pentraeth. It is a Grade II* listed building, a national designation given to "particularly important buildings of more than special interest", because it is a "good rural church retaining substantial medieval fabric."

== History and location ==
St Mary's Church is situated near the east coast of Anglesey, north Wales. It is by the side of a country road near the village of Brynteg. The parish includes the coastal resort of Benllech. The parish takes its name in part from the church: the Welsh word llan originally meant "enclosure" and then "church", and "-fair" is a modified form of Mary (Mair in Welsh). "Mathafarn Eithaf" translates as "area (or field) of the tavern".

It is a medieval church, and the oldest part of the building is the nave, which dates from the 14th century. The chancel and the arch between nave and chancel were added in the following century. The architect of the Diocese of Bangor, Henry Kennedy, carried out work on the church in 1847. He added a vestry on the north side and a porch to the south, as well as making some other alterations and additions, such as the re-roofing of the chancel.

The church is still in use for worship, as part of the Church in Wales. It is one of three churches in the combined benefice of Llanfair Mathafarn Eithaf with Llanbedrgoch with Pentraeth. It is within the deanery of Tindaethwy and Menai, the archdeaconry of Bangor and the Diocese of Bangor. As of 2012, the position of rector is held by the Venerable R P Davies, Archdeacon of Bangor. Services are held on a Sunday morning, alternating between Holy Communion and Morning Prayer.

The Welsh priest and poet Goronwy Owen, who was born in the parish on 1 January 1723, served for three weeks as curate of St Mary's. He later travelled to America to teach at The College of William & Mary, Virginia, and remained in Virginia until his death.

== Architecture and fittings ==
St Mary's is built from rubble masonry, with buttresses at the eastern ends of the nave and chancel, and it has a slate roof. The timbers of the roof can be seen from inside the church. There is a bellcote at the west end of the roof, containing one bell dated 1849. The church has a gallery at the west end, reached by climbing a spiral staircase. The nave is longer and higher than the chancel, with one step and a simple 15th-century chancel arch between them. The nave measures about 52 feet 6 inches by 16 feet 3 inches (about 16 by 5 m), and the chancel measures about 18 feet 6 inches by 13 feet 6 inches (about 5.6 by 4.1 m).

Entrance is through the porch in the middle of the south wall of the nave, which houses a round-headed doorway from the 15th or 16th century. There is a trefoil-headed single window on the south wall of the nave to the left of the porch, and two windows, each with three trefoil-headed lights (sections of window, separated by mullions), to the right of the porch. The south wall of the chancel has a similar window, with only two lights, which was inserted in 1847; it adjoins a blocked window from the 17th century. The north wall of the church, which was rebuilt in 1847, has a 14th-century doorway with a pointed arch, and windows on each side similar to those on the south side. The east window, which dates from the 15th century, has three lights headed with cinquefoils set within a pointed arch. There is a hood mould on the outside.

A 1937 survey by the Royal Commission on Ancient and Historical Monuments in Wales and Monmouthshire noted a wooden communion table, dated 1667, and some interior memorials dated 1724 and 1731. It also recorded that the churchyard contained an 11th-century churchyard cross, which had at one point held a sundial. Most of the fittings inside the church date from the mid-19th century. The pulpit has two carved panels, one depicting Christ and the other a Madonna and Child. It was installed in 1969, marking the bicentenary of Goronwy Owen's death. The reredos behind the altar is in memory of those who died during World War I.

== Assessment ==
The church has national recognition and statutory protection from alteration as it has been designated as a Grade II* listed building – the second-highest of the three grades of listing, designating "particularly important buildings of more than special interest". It was given this status on 12 May 1970. Cadw (the Welsh Assembly Government body responsible for the built heritage of Wales and the inclusion of Welsh buildings on the statutory lists) states that St Mary's has been listed because it is "a good rural church retaining substantial medieval fabric".

Writing in 1847, the clergyman and antiquarian Harry Longueville Jones said that St Mary's, which he called "a rather long and low building", was situated "in an uneven, rocky, and exposed locality" within a parish that had a "peculiarly bleak and desolate appearance". He also thought that the roof of the church was "remarkable for the quantity of good, but light, timber used in its construction."
