= Llanfair-Mathafarn-Eithaf =

Community in Anglesey, Wales

Coordinates: 53.3121°N 4.2360°W

- Community
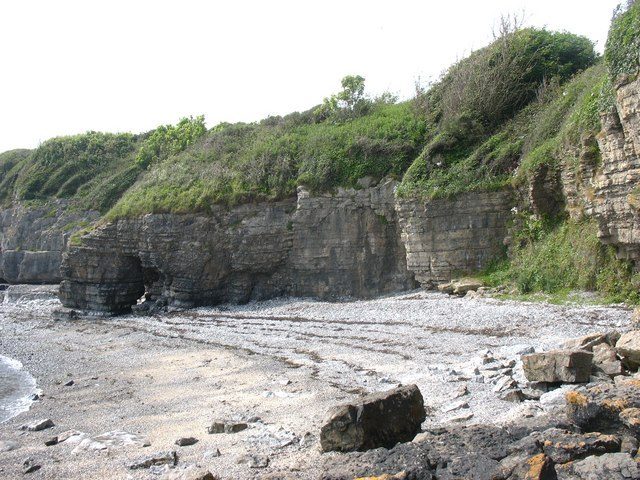
- Shingle beach and natural arch at Huslan cove

- Location within Anglesey
- Principal area: Isle of Anglesey
- Country: Wales
- Sovereign state: United Kingdom
- Police: North Wales
- Fire: North Wales
- Ambulance: Welsh
- UK Parliament: Ynys Mon
- Senedd Cymru – Welsh Parliament: Bangor Conwy Môn
- List of places UK Wales Anglesey Map of the community

Llanfair-Mathafarn-Eithaf (Welsh pronunciation: [ˌɬanvair maˈθavarn ˈei̯θav]) is a parish and community in Anglesey, Wales including the small seaside town of Benllech. The community population taken at the 2011 census was 3,382.

Local buildings include the medieval St Mary's Church, where the 18th century poet Goronwy Owen once served as curate. The parish has five Scheduled Monuments, including two collections of hut circles and the stone remains of a dolmen type Neolithic burial mound, called the Pant-y-Saer Cromlech. The remains of a Viking Age settlement have also been found in the parish.

The parish lies on an area of Carboniferous Limestone and supports a variety of wildlife, including red squirrels. The Cors Goch nature reserve is a rich fenland habitat in the west of the parish and is designated an SSSI.

Other settlements include Brynteg, Llanbedrgoch, Tyn-y-Gongl, and Red Wharf Bay.

== Notable people ==
- Goronwy Owen (1723–1769) a notable Welsh poet
- Howel Harris Hughes (1873–1956), theologian, Presbyterian minister and Principal of the United Theological College in Aberystwyth was born in the parish.
