= Llanbedrgoch =

Hamlet in Anglesey, Wales

Coordinates: 53.3°N 4.2367°W

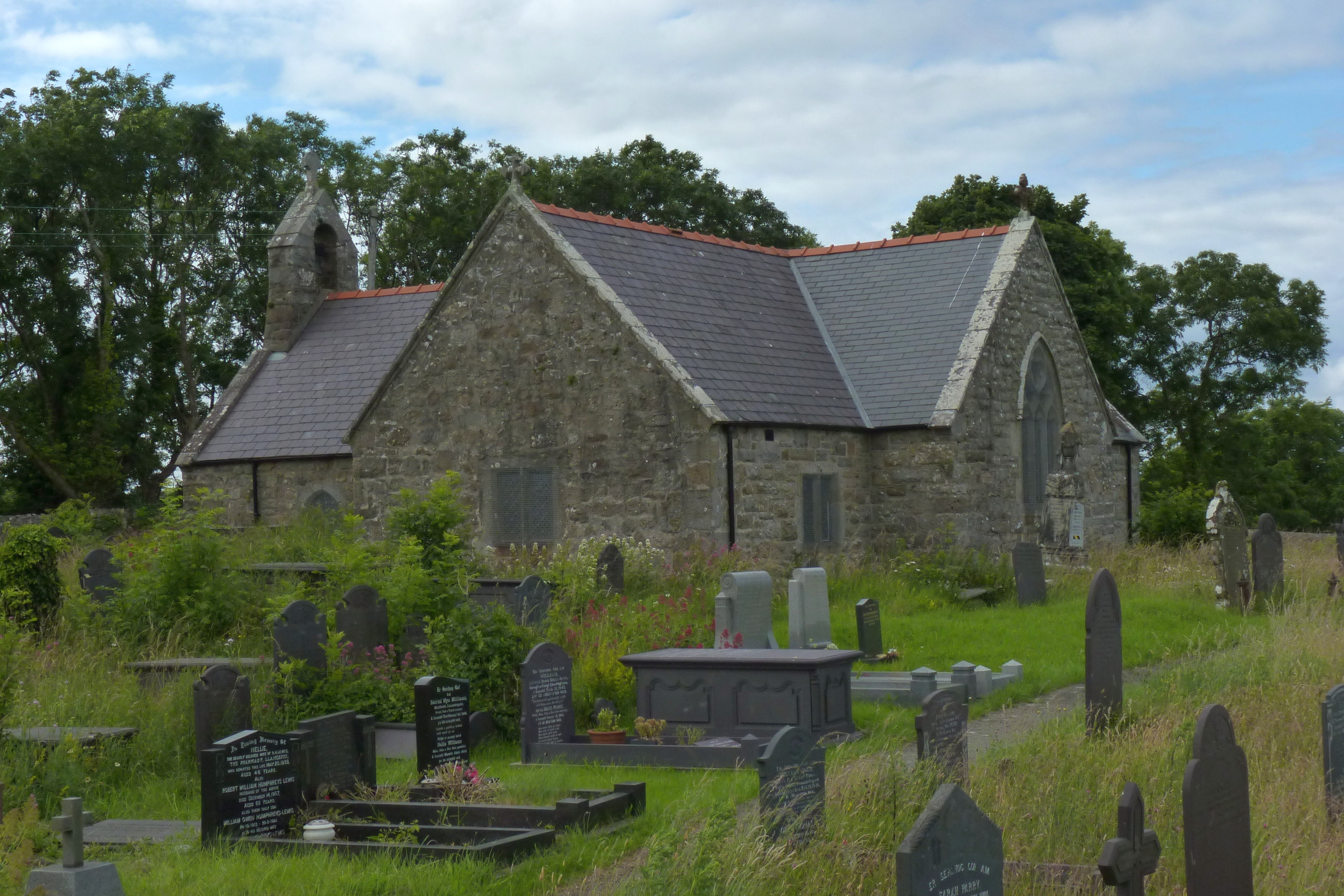
- St Peter's Church, Llanbedrgoch

- Location within Anglesey
- OS grid reference: SH509804
- Community: Llanfair-Mathafarn-Eithaf
- Principal area: Anglesey
- Preserved county: Gwynedd
- Country: Wales
- Sovereign state: United Kingdom
- Post town: LLANBEDRGOCH
- Postcode district: LL76
- Dialling code: 01248
- Police: North Wales
- Fire: North Wales
- Ambulance: Welsh
- UK Parliament: Ynys Môn
- Senedd Cymru – Welsh Parliament: Bangor Conwy Môn

Llanbedrgoch (Welsh pronunciation) is a hamlet and post town, a mile south of the town of Benllech and west of Red Wharf Bay, on the island of Anglesey (Welsh: Ynys Môn), north Wales. The parish church is St Peter's Church, Llanbedrgoch, a Grade II* listed building that dates back to the 15th century.

The historical settlements in the area have been subject of archaeological exploration. The village hosted the National Eisteddfod of Wales in 1999.

Prior to the 2013 council elections, Llanbedrgoch was a single councillor ward to the Isle of Anglesey County Council, though following The Isle of Anglesey (Electoral Arrangements) Order 2012 the ward was amalgamated into a new multi-councillor ward, Lligwy.

== Notable people ==
- Gwyn Hughes Jones (born 1969) operatic tenor in romantic Italian operatic repertoire.
- Kiri Pritchard-McLean (born 1986), a Welsh comedian and writer.
