= Lewis Morris (1701–1765) =

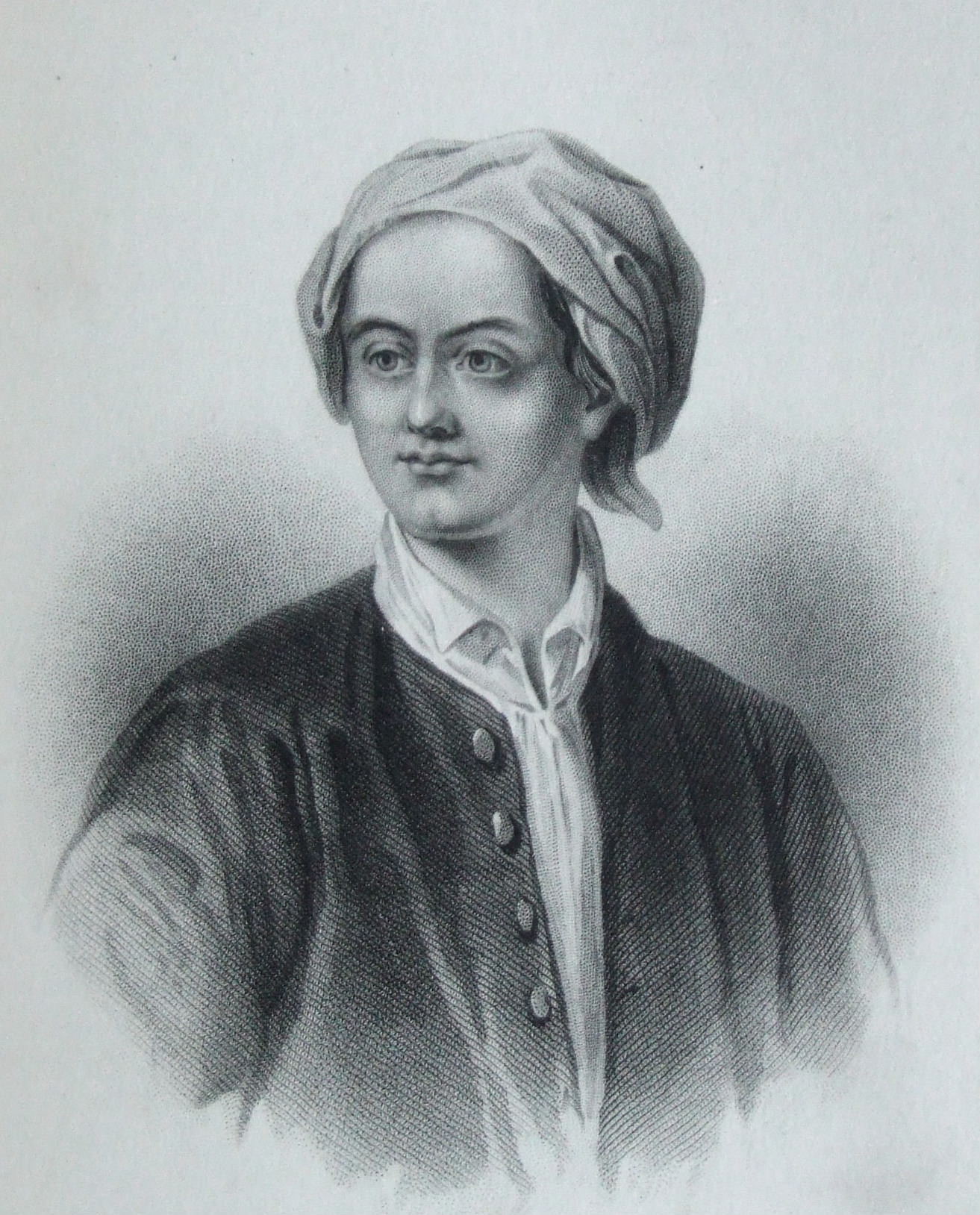
Lewis Morris

Lewis Morris (2 March 1701 – 11 April 1765) was a Welsh hydrographer, antiquary, poet and lexicographer, the eldest of the Morris brothers of Anglesey.

Lewis Morris was the eldest son of Morris ap Rhisiart Morris, a farmer, of Llanfihangel-Tre'r-Beirdd in Anglesey.

His bardic name was Llewelyn Ddu o Fôn ("Black Llewelyn [Lewis] of Anglesey"). The correspondence between him and his younger brothers is a valuable historical source. In 1751, he founded the Honourable Society of Cymmrodorion along with his brother Richard.

== Career as a cartographer ==
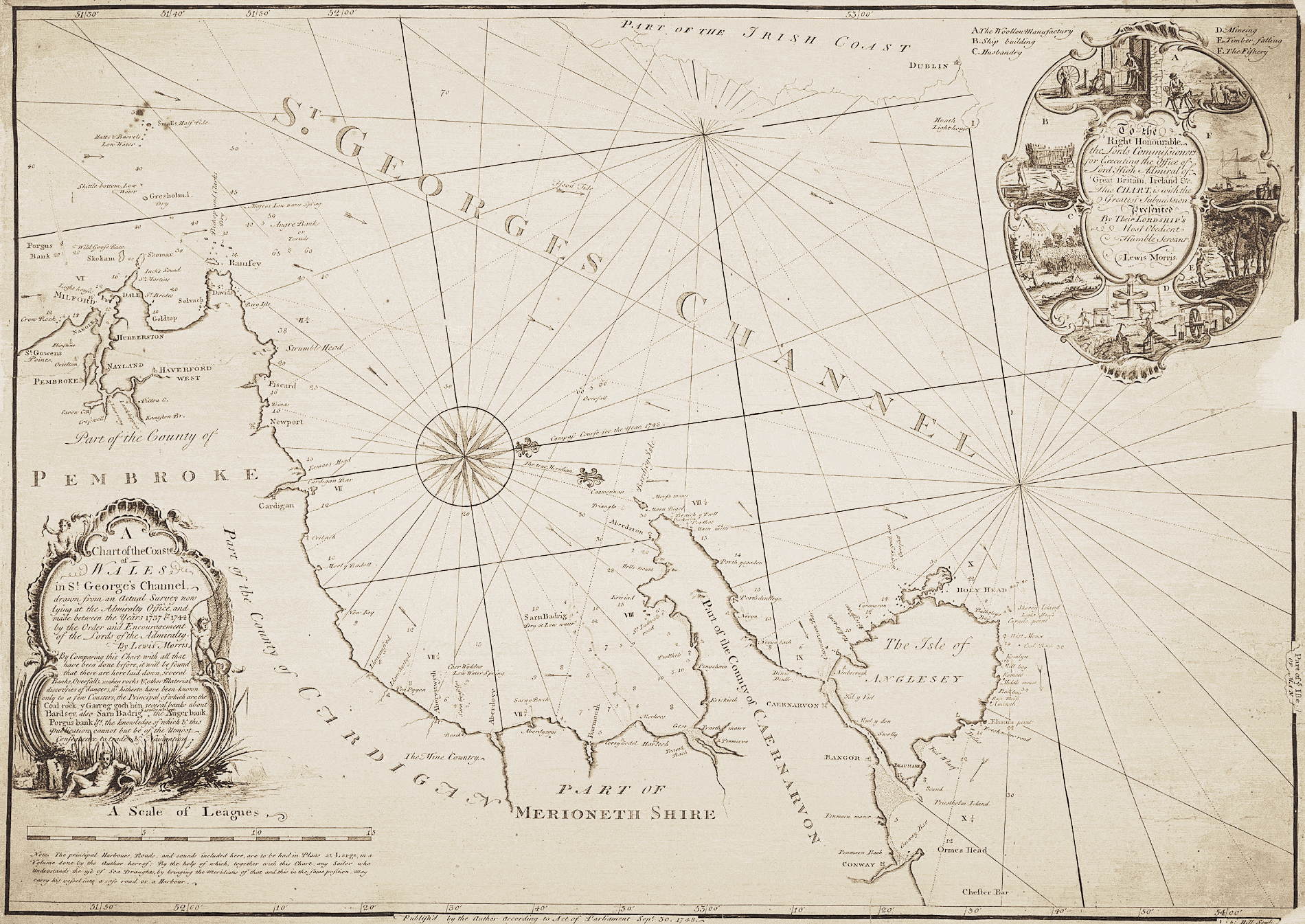
Morris' survey of the Welsh coast was published in 1748

Although there is no record of his having had any further education, Lewis Morris began his career as an estate-surveyor, and was employed by the Meyrick family of Bodorgan. He worked as a Customs official from 1729, and was later involved in the Cardiganshire mining industry. However, he is perhaps best known for his hydrographic surveys of the Welsh Coast.

The idea for the survey probably arose while he was working as a Customs official in Holyhead, where he would have come into contact with many seafarers. At this time there were no accurate and up-to-date hydrographic charts of the Welsh coast and many ships and people died as a result.

Morris put his idea for a survey to the Admiralty, but they showed little interest and he was obliged to undertake the work at his own expense. The result of his efforts was the publication of Plans of harbours, bars, bays, and roads in St. George's-Channel in 1748.

While this work had a major impact on the safety of shipping around the Welsh coast at the time; Morris's contribution to British cartography was for many years eclipsed by his other achievements.

== Later career ==
In his spare time, Morris began prospecting for lead, and during the 1750s he was in constant dispute with his employers and was prosecuted and lost his job as collector of tolls at Aberdyfi. He visited London several times in order to contest court cases relating to his industrial activities; whilst there, he assisted his brother Richard in setting up the Cymmrodorion Society. However, Lewis's long-term project, the publication of a dictionary, was never completed.

He died on 11 April 1765 and is buried in Llanbadarn Fawr Churchyard in Wales.

== Works ==
- Plans of Harbours, Bays, and Roads in St. George's and the Bristol Channels (1748)
- Tlysau yr Hen Oesoedd (1753)
- Short History of the Manor of Creuthyn (1756)
- Celtic Remains (1757; not published until 1878)

== Sources ==
- Welsh Biography Online
