= St Margaret's Church, Roath =

Church in Cardiff, Wales

St Margaret of Antioch
- Eglwys y Santes Fererid
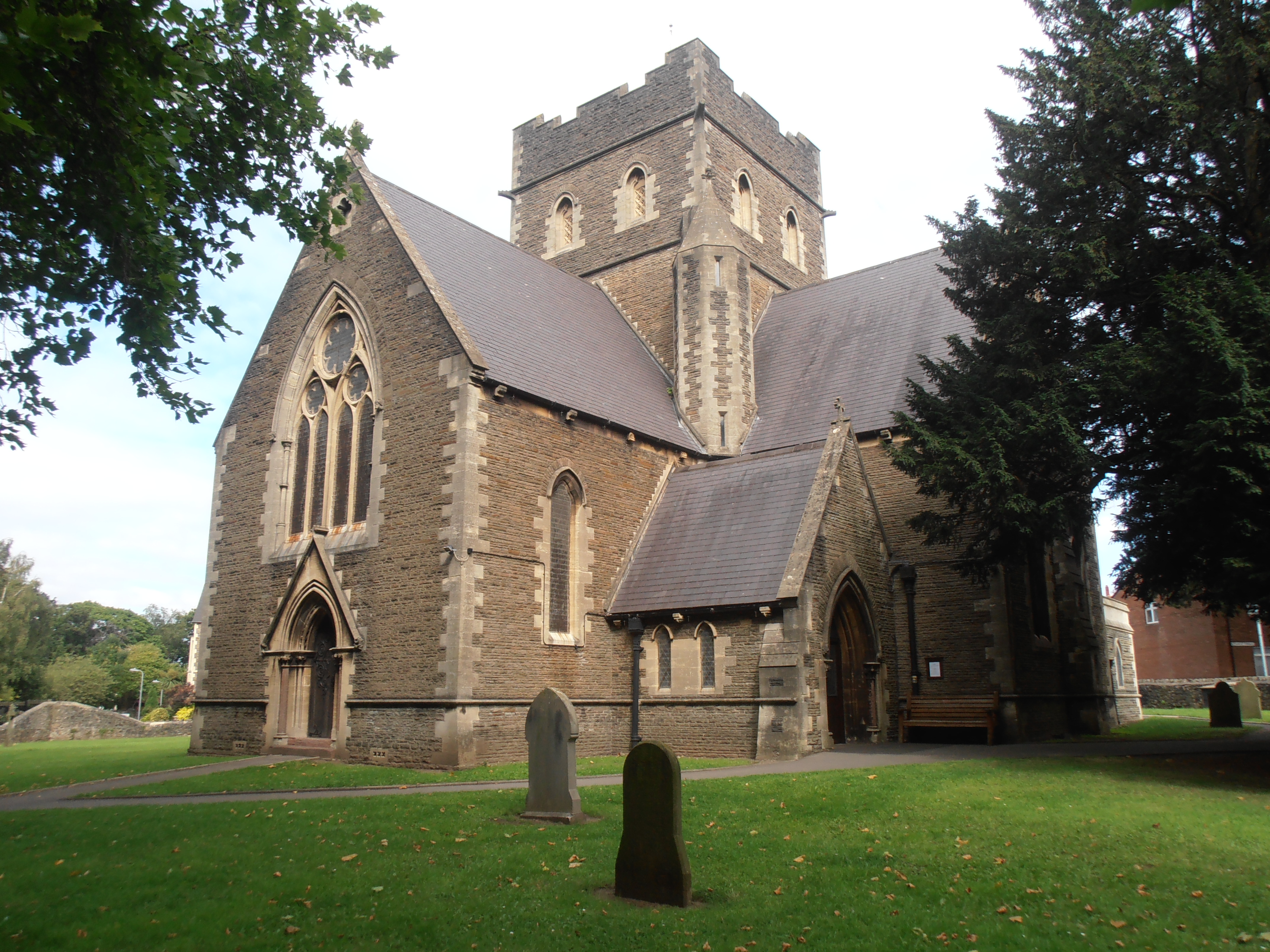
- St Margaret of Antioch
- 51.4929°N 3.1547°W
- Denomination: Church in Wales
- Previous denomination: Roman Catholic
- Website: The

History
- Status: Active
- Founded: 11th century
- Dedication: St Margaret of Antioch

Architecture
- Functional status: Mother church
- Heritage designation: Grade I
- Designated: 19 May 1975
- Architect: John Prichard
- Completed: 1870 (tower 1926)

Specifications
- Materials: Stone

Administration
- Diocese: Diocese of Llandaff
- Parish: Roath

St Margaret's Church (Welsh: Eglwys y Santes Fererid, dedicated to St Margaret of Antioch) is a nineteenth-century Church in Wales parish church in the suburb of Roath, Cardiff, Wales. It includes the mausoleum of the Marquises of Bute.

== History ==
A church dedicated to St Margaret existed in Roath since the medieval period. It was a small Perpendicular style building with a bell-turret at the western end. In 1800 a mausoleum was added, for the Marquesses of Bute. The church was completely demolished in 1868 to make way for a new replacement.

The new church was completed, with a cruciform plan in a Decorated Gothic style. The plan had been designed by Alexander Roos, architect to the Butes. The above ground church was designed by architect John Prichard and financed by John Crichton-Stuart, 3rd Marquess of Bute, who dismissed Roos when he came of age in 1868. A wide variety of coloured bricks and coloured stone was used to decorate the internal walls, in red, blue, white, grey-green and pink. The church tower (without the spire envisaged by Prichard) was designed later by John Coates Carter and completed in 1926.

The glasswork of the church's east window was destroyed in a bomb-blast during the Second World War. The present glass, dating from 1952, depicts the Ascension of Jesus, flanked by the patron saints of the four daughter churches: St Edward's, St Anne's, St Agnes's and St Philip's. Of these churches, only St Edward's still holds a daughter position. St Agnes's closed in 1966 and St Anne's in 2015. St Philip is still an operational church, but is no longer in the parish after the boundaries were adjusted in the late 20th century.

The church was designated a Grade I listed building in 1975.

== Bute mausoleum ==
An ornate north aisle chapel was added to the church between 1881 and 1886, as the new mausoleum for the Bute family tombs. Seven large sarcophagi in red granite, were added to contain the remains of the members of the Bute family who had been interred in the previous church. The original stone memorial plaques were included in the new tombs.

Those interred in the sarcophagi are:

- Charlotte Jane Windsor, Marchioness of Bute (1746–1800) – first wife of the first Marquess.
- John Stuart, 1st Marquess of Bute (1744–1814)
- Frances Coutts, Dowager Marchioness of Bute (1773–1832) – second wife of the first Marquess.
- John Stuart, Lord Mount Stuart (1767–1794)
- Gertrude Amelia Stuart (died 1809) – widow of Lord Henry Stuart.
- Lord Henry Stuart (1777–1809) – a son of the first Marquess and Charlotte.
- Elizabeth Penelope Stuart (1819–1822) – daughter of Lord James Stuart.

== Daughter Churches ==
St Margaret's had a number of daughter churches, including the nearby St Edward's on Blenheim Road. Its other former daughter churches were:

- St Francis, Splott, opened in 1894, stood on Singleton Street and was built primarily to serve the workers of the copper, steel and ironworks of the East Moors area. It closed in 1969.
- St Agnes, Roath, opened in 1886, served the area south of Broadway. It was later transferred to the Parish of St German's. Its altar is now in St Mary's Butetown. It closed in 1966, though the name survives as a chapel in St German's, where its war memorial, is now located.
- St Anne's, Roath opened in 1887. It closed in 2015.
- St Philip's, Tremorfa was founded in 1930 to serve what was then a new council estate. It was originally a hall, which was replaced in 1937 by a tin tabernacle which had itself formerly been St Joseph's, Gabalfa and St Alban's, Splott, both of which had been replaced by permanent buildings. It was replaced by a permanent building in 1966. It was separated from the Parish of Roath in the late 20th century and has been partnered with St Mark's, Gabalfa since 2004.

St Margaret's is now in the Ministry Area of Roath and Cathays, alongside the aforementioned St Edward's and St German's, St Martin's, Roath and St Michael's, Cathays.

== Gallery ==
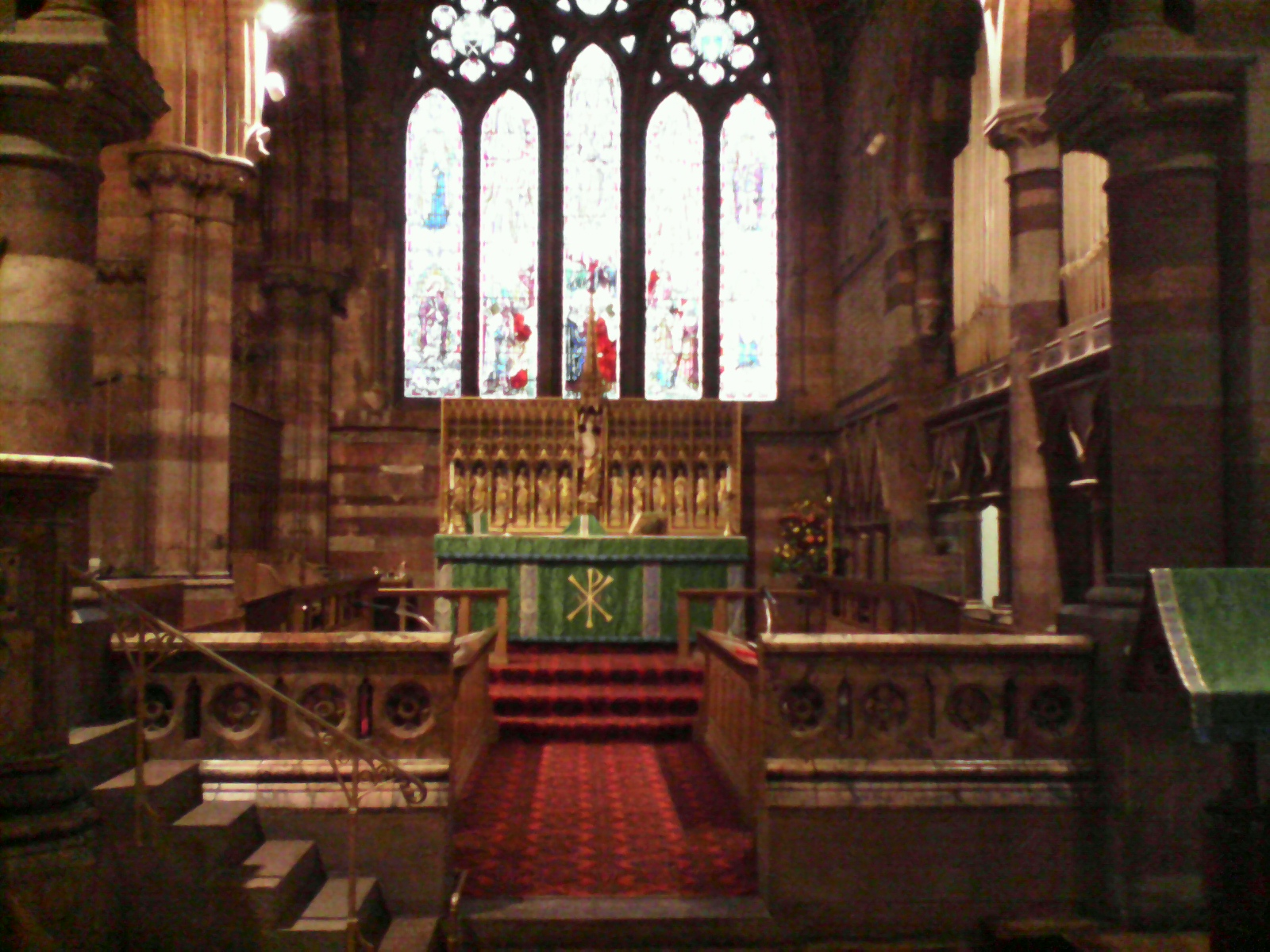
Interior of St Margaret's

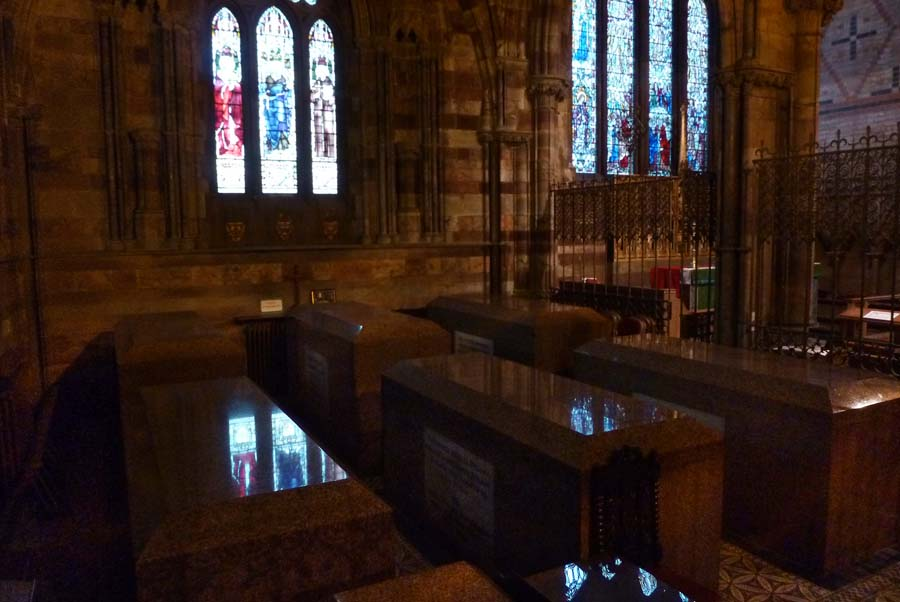
Bute Mausoleum

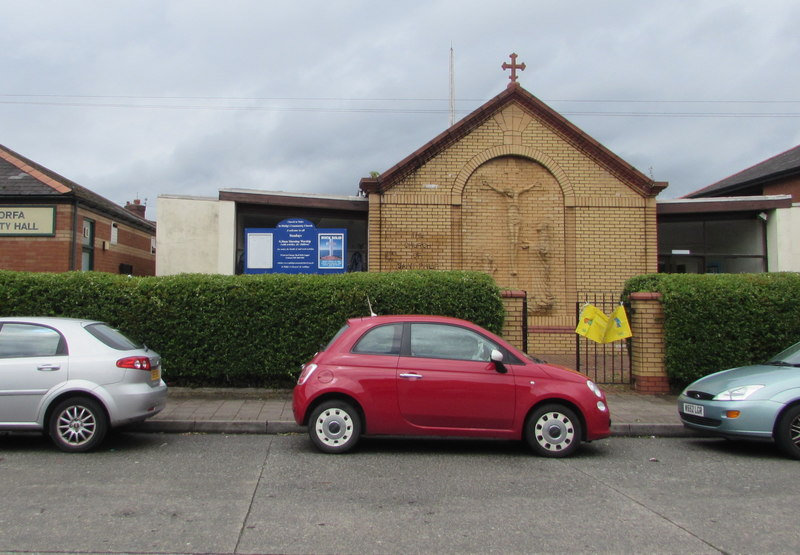
St Philips, Tremorfa
