= 1920 Cardiff City Council election =

Local election in Cardiff, Wales

The 1920 Cardiff City Council election was held on Monday 1 November 1920 to elect councillors to Cardiff City Council in Cardiff, Glamorgan, Wales. It took place on the same day as many other local elections in Wales and England.

This was the second annual all-Cardiff elections since the 1914-18 Great War. The previous elections were in November 1919 and the next annual all-Cardiff elections were to take place in November 1921.

The election saw campaigning to stop the Labour Party repeating its successes of November 1919.

== Background ==
Cardiff County Borough Council had been created in 1889. Cardiff became a city in 1905. Elections to the local authority were held annually, though not all council seats were included in each contest, because the three councillors in each ward stood down for election in three-yearly rotation. Ten seats in ten electoral wards were up for election in November 1920.

The council consisted of 30 councillors who were elected by the town's voters and ten aldermen who were elected by the councillors.

The previous all-Cardiff elections in 1919 had seen significant gains of seats for the Labour Party and Ex-Servicemen candidates.

== Overview of the result ==
In November 1920 contests took place in eight of the ten Cardiff electoral wards. The two retiring Conservative Party councillors in the Central and South wards were elected unopposed.

The Western Mail was partisan in South Wales, having campaigned for two months to stop the Labour "extremists" from repeating their successes of 1919. In the Canton, Grangetown, Riverside, Roath and Splott wards the Conservative and Liberal parties came together to put forward a joint candidate, so as to not split the vote.

The Liberal-Conservative Coalition candidates won by substantial majorities over Labour in four of the five wards in which they stood. In contrast, Labour's Herbert Hiles won against the Coalition candidate (who was the retiring member) in the Splott ward. The only other sitting candidate (a Liberal) to lose their seat was in the Park ward, where the Conservatives won the contest.

Turnout was substantially up on 1919 (42.4%) with 55.1% turning up to vote in November 1920. Women voters often outnumbered men, in some wards by 2 to 1.

=== Council composition ===
Following the November 1919 election the balance on the city council was 17 Liberal, 15 Conservative, 4 Labour, 3 Ex-Servicemen, 1 Independent. In 1920 Labour increased their number by one, as did the Independents. Four previously Liberal/Conservative members were elected as, or were replaced by 'Coalition' members.

== Ward results ==
=== Adamsdown ===
Adamsdown ward 1920
Party	Candidate	Votes	%	±%
Independent	Edward Curran	1,389		
Labour	William Williams	1,247		

Curran had stood unsuccessfully for the Liberal Party in the Cardiff South UK parliamentary constituency for the 1918 General Election.

=== Canton ===
Canton ward 1920
Party	Candidate	Votes	%	±%
Con-Lib Coalition	W. B. Francis *	3,195		
Labour	Alfred Marsh	1,653		

=== Cathays ===
Cathays ward 1920
Party	Candidate	Votes	%	±%
Liberal	W. R. Williams	2,983		
Labour	T. R. Morgan	1,989		

=== Central ===
Retiring Conservative Party councillor re-elected unopposed.

=== Grangetown ===
Grangetown ward 1920
Party	Candidate	Votes	%	±%
Con-Lib Coalition	H. W. Bruton	2,154		
Labour	J. H. Rogers	1,638		

=== Park ===
Park ward 1920
Party	Candidate	Votes	%	±%
Conservative	Edmund Charles Willmott	2,484		
Liberal	William Charles *	2,141		
Labour	D. J. Skelly	1,249		

=== Riverside ===
Riverside ward 1920
Party	Candidate	Votes	%	±%
Con-Lib Coalition	John Daniel *	2,808		
Labour	Roderick Hughes	682		
Ex-Servicemen	Barnett Janner	562		

=== Roath ===
Roath ward 1920
Party	Candidate	Votes	%	±%
Con-Lib Coalition	A. J. Howells *	3,540		
Labour	John W. Pickles	1,424		

=== South ===
Retiring Conservative Party councillor re-elected unopposed.

=== Splott ===
Splott ward 1920
Party	Candidate	Votes	%	±%
Labour	Herbert Hiles	2,295		
Con-Lib Coalition	Frederick Dash	2,187		

* = 'retiring' ward councillor for re-election
