= 1919 Cardiff City Council election =

Local election in Cardiff, Wales

The 1919 Cardiff City Council election was held on Saturday 1 November 1919 to elect councillors to Cardiff City Council in Cardiff, Glamorgan, Wales.

This was the first all-Cardiff elections for six years, due to the occurrence of the 1914-18 Great War. The previous elections were in November 1913 and the next annual all-Cardiff elections were to take place as normal on 1 November 1920.

The election saw control of the council transfer from the Conservative Party to the Liberals.

== Background ==
Cardiff County Borough Council had been created in 1889. Cardiff became a city in 1905. Elections to the local authority were held annually, though not all council seats were included in each contest, because the three councillors in each ward stood down for election in three-yearly rotation.

The council consisted of 30 councillors who were elected by the town's voters and ten aldermen who were elected by the councillors. Ten seats were up for election in November 1919.

== Overview of the result ==
Contests took place in all ten of the Cardiff electoral wards in November 1919. In addition to candidates standing under the Conservative, Liberal and Labour tickets, there were men standing from discharged soldiers' organisations, as Ex-Service men candidates. Press interest was also raised by a 'lady candidate' in the Roath ward, who was standing for the Women's Council. Mrs Janet Price Williams was unsuccessful in her bid to be Cardiff's first woman councillor.

The election news was dominated by the successes of the Labour and Ex-Servicemen candidates in South Wales. Four Labour and three Ex-Servicemen won seats in Cardiff.

=== Council composition ===
The composition of the council immediately prior to these elections was Conservatives 20, Liberals 19, Independent 1. Following the November 1919 election the balance had changed, to 17 Liberal, 15 Conservative, 4 Labour, 3 Ex-Servicemen, 1 Independent.

== Ward results ==
=== Adamsdown ===
Adamsdown ward 1919
Party	Candidate	Votes	%	±%
Labour	J. Donovan	1,597		
Liberal	William Jones *	889		
Labour gain from Liberal		Swing		

=== Canton ===
Canton ward 1919
Party	Candidate	Votes	%	±%
Ex-Servicemen	T. L. Francis	1,549		
Liberal	William Grey	1,407		
Railway Clerks	T. H. Spence	1,089		
Ex-Servicemen gain from Liberal		Swing		

=== Cathays ===
Cathays ward 1919
Party	Candidate	Votes	%	±%
N. U. R.	A. E. Gough	2,066		
Liberal	W. R. Williams *	1,627		
Labour gain from Liberal		Swing		

=== Central ===
Central ward 1919
Party	Candidate	Votes	%	±%
Ex-Servicemen	Capt. Thomas W. Langman	983		
Conservative	F. W. Blower *	444		
Ex-Servicemen gain from Conservative		Swing		

=== Grangetown ===
Grangetown ward 1919
Party	Candidate	Votes	%	±%
N. U. R.	Ivor George Dudderidge	1,753		
Conservative	W. R. Smith *	1,219		
Liberal	A. B. Sessions	478		
Labour gain from Conservative		Swing		

=== Park ===
Park ward 1919
Party	Candidate	Votes	%	±%
Liberal	Robert Gerard Hill Snook *	1,087		
Allotment Federation	D. Skelly	1,027		
Independent	A. H. Teague	152		
Liberal hold		Swing		

=== Riverside ===
Riverside ward 1919
Party	Candidate	Votes	%	±%
Ex-Servicemen	R. C. Brittan	1,518		
Liberal	S. Instone	698		
Railway Clerks	William Alfred Plummer	674		
Ex-Servicemen gain from Liberal		Swing		

=== Roath ===
Roath ward 1919
Party	Candidate	Votes	%	±%
Liberal	G. Fred Evans	1,446		
Labour	John W. Pickles	1,159		
Conservative	William Henry Lever	880		
Women's Council	Mrs Janet Price Williams	835		
Liberal hold		Swing		

=== South ===
South ward 1919
Party	Candidate	Votes	%	±%
Conservative	John Ash Thompson	784		
Seaman	Capt. Jaines Griffiths	229		
Conservative hold		Swing		

=== Splott ===
Splott ward 1919
Party	Candidate	Votes	%	±%
Labour	G. B. Smith	1,964		
Liberal	T. Williams	1,550		
Conservative	George Francis Willett *	572		
Labour gain from Conservative		Swing		

* = 'retiring' ward councillor for re-election
