= Frank Roper =

Frank Roper may refer to:

- Frank Roper (artist) (1914–2000), British sculptor and stained-glass artist
- Frank Roper (paedophile) (died 2005), former youth coach, English football league
