= Frank Roper (artist) =

British sculptor and stained-glass artist (1914–2000)

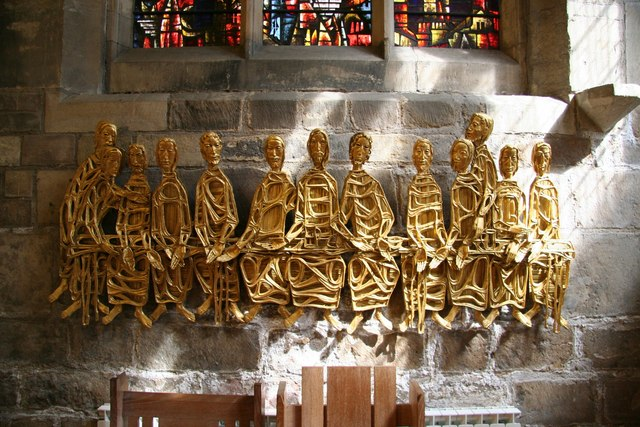
- The last supper, St.Michael-le-Grand church, York (1968)
- Born: 12 December 1914; Haworth, Yorkshire, England
- Died: 3 December 2000 (aged 85)
- Known for: Sculptor, stained-glass artist
- Spouse: Nora Ellison (1918–1999)

Frank Roper MBE (12 December 1914 – 3 December 2000) was a British sculptor and stained-glass artist who undertook commissions for churches and cathedrals across Wales and England.

In addition to religious commissions, Roper created a wide variety of sculptures which were sold privately and to corporate bodies. His non-religious sculpture included animals and birds, as well as animated sculptures and musical fountains.

== Biography ==
Frank Roper was born 12 December 1914 in Haworth, Yorkshire. He studied at Keighley Art School (meeting his future wife, Nora Ellison) and the Royal College of Art, London, where he was a student of Henry Moore. In 1947 he became a sculpture lecturer at Cardiff College of Art, later vice principal until 1964. He retired from the college in 1973 "to be free to play my own games". He lived in Penarth and created his own foundry on the ground floor of his house where he made his metal sculptures. Roper has been credited with inventing the lost-polystyrene casting process.

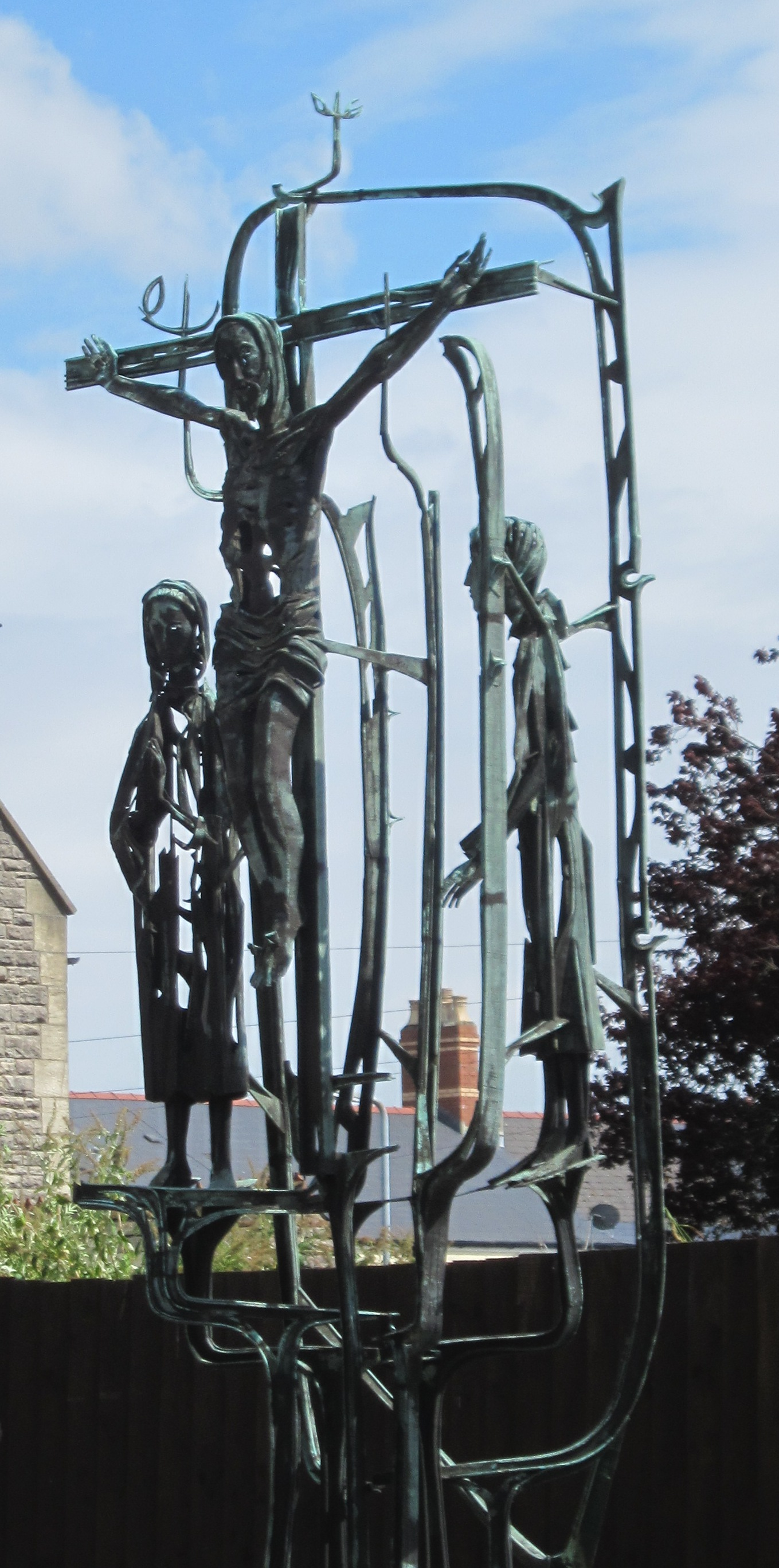
Crucifixion with Mary and John, St German's Church, Cardiff (1965)

Many of Roper's early commissions stemmed from the need to repair places of worship after they had suffered bomb damage during World War II. He went on to become one of the most prolific of all post-War artists undertaking church commissions. His major commissions included work for Llandaff Cathedral, Durham Cathedral, St David's Cathedral in Pembrokeshire and Peterborough Cathedral. He created a wall-mounted "Stations of the Cross" (1959) for St Martin's in Roath, Cardiff, "Crucifixion with Mary and John" (1965) outside St German's Church, Adamsdown, Cardiff and an aluminium reredos screen (1968) for St Martin le Grand, York. Roper also created engraved and stained glass, for example at St Peter's Church, Chippenham.

Two BBC television programmes were made about Roper, one in 1964 ("Mind into Metal – Frank Roper, Sculptor") and the other in 1976 ("Look, Stranger: Sculpture and Singing Fountains", in which Roper was interviewed by René Cutforth). Roper's non-religious sculpture includes cast aluminium figures of birds and animals, some of which were animated; and fountains that produced musical sounds using the principle of the water organ.

Two of Roper's works are in the collection of National Museum Wales: St Michael and the Devil and Horse.

Roper was awarded the MBE in 1991 for his services to art.

He died at the end of 2000. In 2014 an exhibition marking the centenary year of his birth was held at the Travellers Gallery, Barry. A memorial service at Llandaff Cathedral was held on the centenary date, 12 December 2014. The "Frank Roper Centre" opened in February 2019 at the Church of the Resurrection in Ely, Cardiff; a permanent exhibition of Roper's life and works.

== Lost-polystyrene casting in aluminium ==
Roper working at home

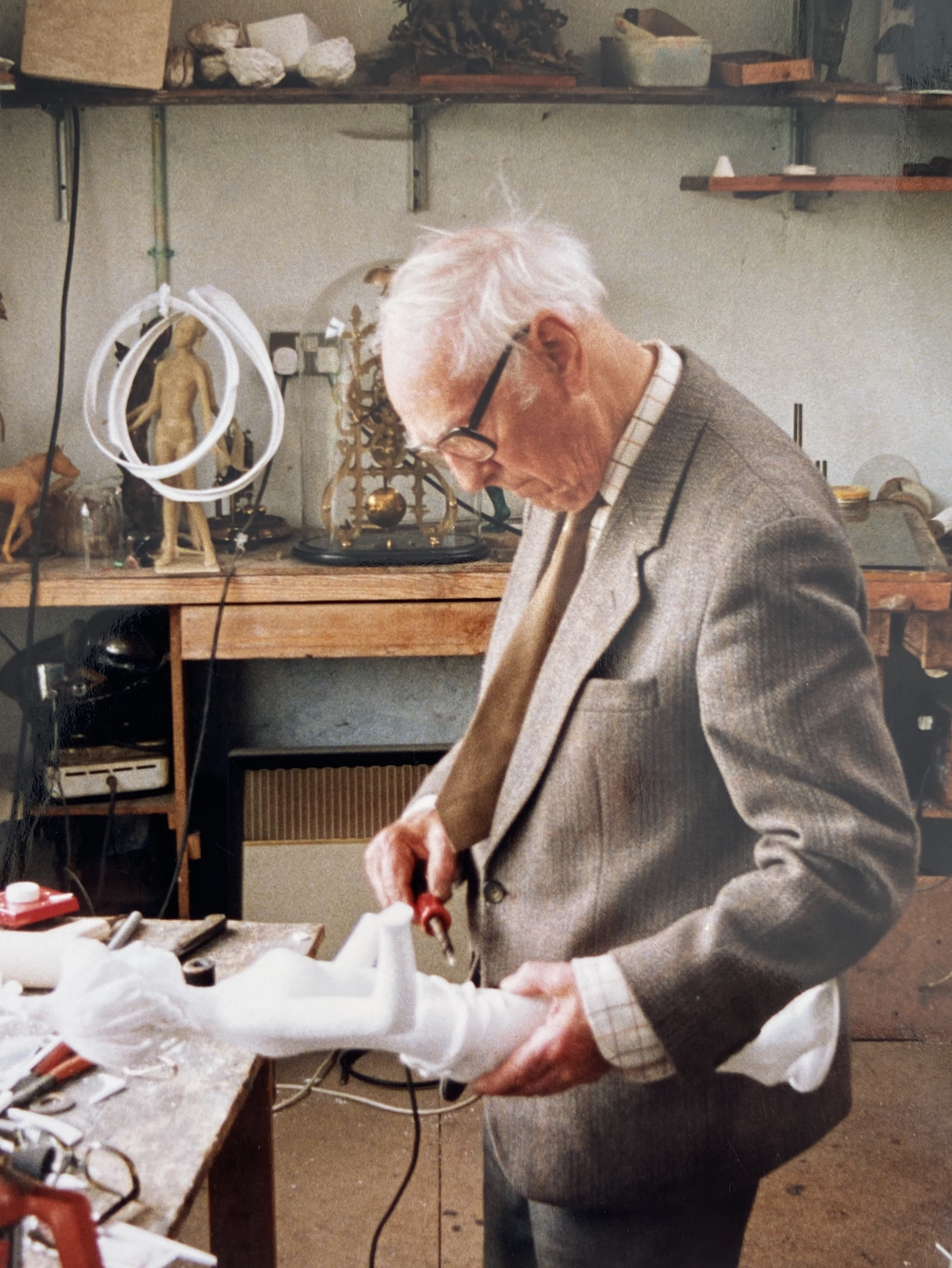
Creating a polystyrene figure

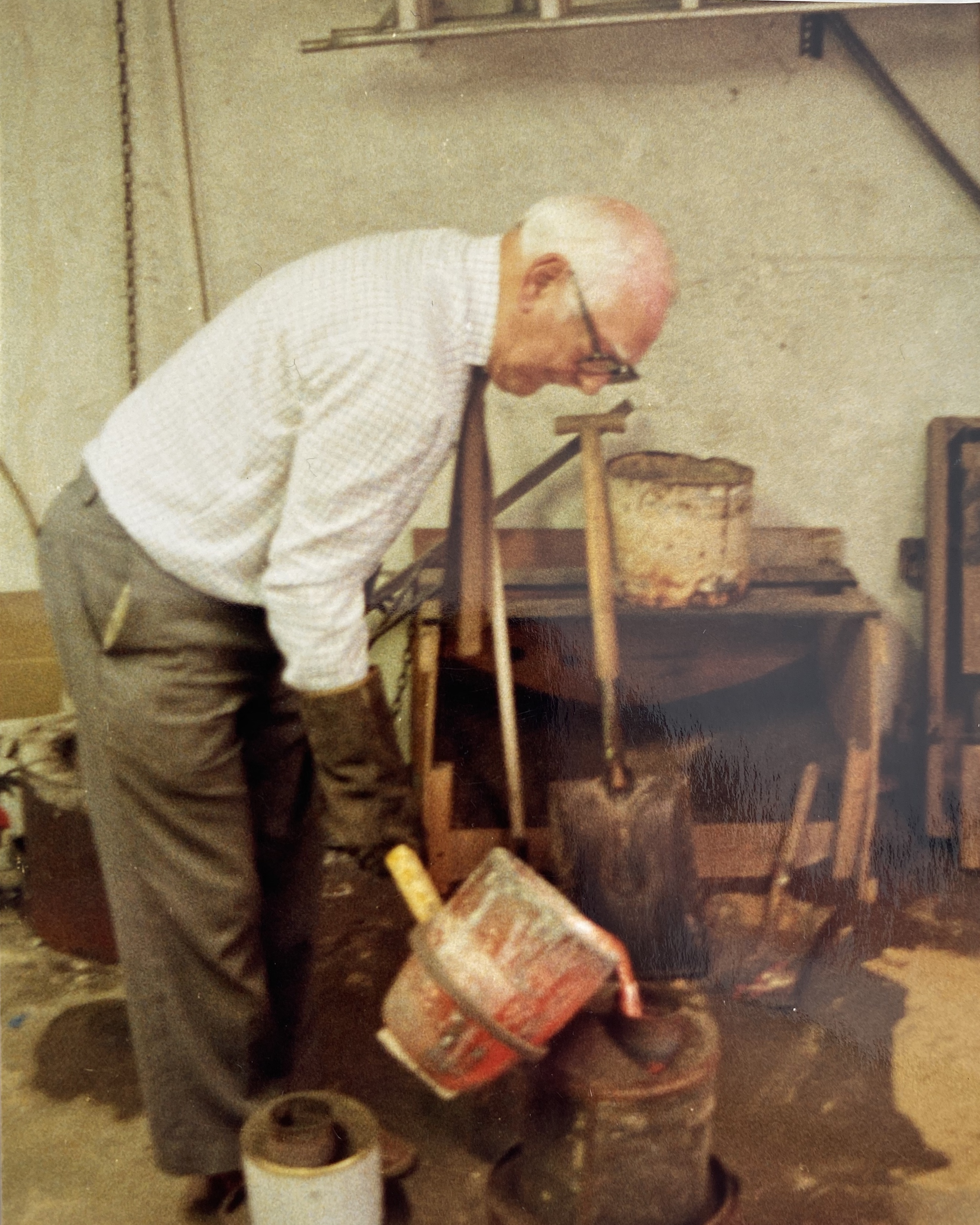
Casting in aluminium

Roper was one of the first sculptors to adopt the lost-polystyrene method, almost always casting in aluminium, perfecting the technique in 1964. It is now used widely in manufacturing (known as lost-foam casting).

Over his career Roper worked in wood, stone and bronze, but many of his ecclesiastical commissions, as well as his musical fountains and water clocks, were cast in aluminium. He became interested in aluminium in the 1950s; the Stations of the Cross for St Martin's in Roath, Cardiff, completed in 1959, were an early example of his religious art in the metal.

His work for Christ Church in Roath (1964) may have been his first commission using the lost-polystyrene method, a casting process recognisable by the texture of the metal, as the pitted nature of the expanded polystyrene remains visible.

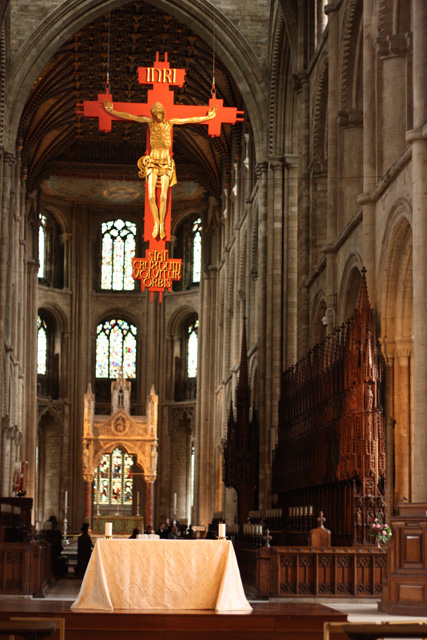
Crucifix, Peterborough Cathedral (1974)

Modelling in expanded polystyrene allowed Roper to work on a larger scale. It is light and strong, enabling complicated structures to be built. The lower cost of aluminium, compared to bronze for example, made it possible to use sculpture where normally there would not be sufficient money available. Having his own home foundry also kept costs down and allowed for a very direct relationship with the finished work – "conception, creation and casting became one continuous process" he told the Church Times in 1994.

In the 1976 BBC documentary Look Stranger, Roper explains that he would sculpt from a solid block of expanded polystyrene using a hot wire, soldering irons, home-made whittlers and sand-paper:

"I like to use polystyrene. This is the most direct means of casting. One can enjoy the modelling and realise that the casting is very little effort. Once I've got the thing in polystyrene it's almost finished. The polystyrene is sunk into sand. I use dry sand from one of the beaches down here. You pour metal on top, then the polystyrene vaporises, the metal fills the space where the polystyrene was and you're left with an aluminium casting... if the casting fails I've lost the model."

Roper is credited with inventing the process although other artists were developing this technique at the same time, including the sculptor Geoffrey Clarke, working in East Anglia. The Canadian sculptor Armand Vaillancourt as well as Alfred M Duca, a sculptor and research associate at the Massachusetts Institute of Technology, are also noted to have been the first to cast in this way.

== Stained and etched glass ==
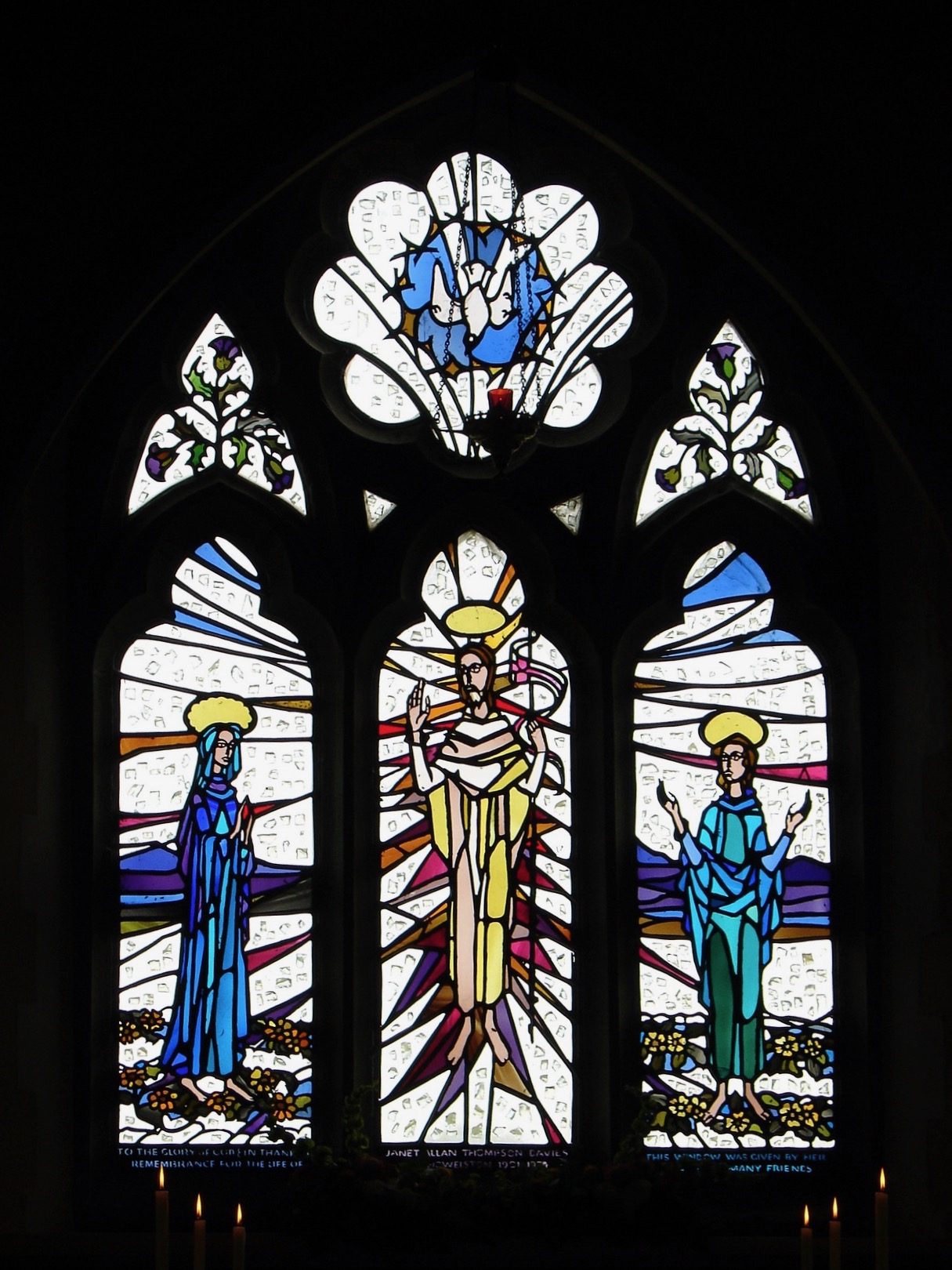
Stained-glass window by Roper in St Mary's church, Talbenny, Pembrokeshire

Roper has stained glass or etched windows in over twenty churches in Wales and England. His wife Nora, an artist in her own right, influenced the colours as well as the symbolism depicted in the designs, for example with the 'flower calendar' window in St Michael's Church, Michaelston-le-Pit and Christ in Majesty, a window in St Illtyd's Church, Llantwit Fardre.

His approach to stained-glass windows was unique, combining cast aluminium forms with coloured antique glass and knapped chunks of float glass. These were bonded together in various formations and set into window openings creating a relief form of stained glass.

The cast aluminium incorporated within the designs often added further depth and dimension. "That's the important thing about them", Roper notes in the documentary Look Stranger, "they are primarily sculpture, so at night when there's no light coming in from outside we have an interesting relief." An example can be seen in Virgin and Child, a window in St Augustine's in Rumney, Cardiff; Peter Leech in The Religious Art of Frank Roper describes the "literally outstanding" metal "delineat[ing] the figure emerging from a profundity of deep blue glass".

The sculptural nature of his stained glass can also be seen in his windows depicting the Stations of the Cross at the Church of Our Lady Queen of Peace, Newcastle Emlyn, with Leech observing "the sombre metal silhouetted against the lambent glass". Another set of Stations of the Cross can be found in St Peter's Church in Chippenham: small intensely coloured, built-in stained glass panels set within aluminium tracery.

Roper's window depicting the Resurrection in St Mary's, Talbenny, Pembrokeshire, one of three in that church, is an example of his use of small chunks of knapped glass fixed to the surface in order to catch and disperse light.

Perhaps his most notable examples of etched glass are at St Peter's Church in Chippenham, including the large St Peter's Window occupying an entire wall and featuring three predominant images of St Peter as well as images linked to St Peter's story. He and Nora were commissioned to provide a comprehensive scheme, which also included sculpture, a screen and stained-glass windows.

== Ecclesiastical works ==
=== England ===
Church/cathedral	Location	County or unitary authority	Category	Description	Date	Reference(s)
St. Brendan's Sixth Form College chapel	Brislington	Bristol	Glass	Stations of the Cross etchings on glass	Unknown	
St Bernadette's Church	Whitchurch	Bristol	Sculpture	Suspended crucifix	1982	
Peterborough Cathedral	Peterborough	Cambridgeshire	Sculpture	Crucifix (suspended above main altar)	1974	
Durham Cathedral	Durham	County Durham	Lettering	Panel of lettering for the tomb of St Bede	1970	
Stoke Christian Centre	Stoke, Plymouth	Devon	Glass	A long frieze window depicting the Creation (the centre was originally called Stoke Methodist Church)	Unknown	
All Saints Church	Branston	Lincolnshire	Sculpture	Reredos, originally installed in Grimsby Minster; restored and moved to All Saints in 2018.	1972	
St Thomas' Church	Brompton	North Yorkshire	Sculpture	Reredos of the Last Supper in aluminium, collaboration with George Pace	1965	
St Martin-le-Grand Church	York	North Yorkshire	Sculpture	Gilt aluminium reredos of the Last Supper	1968	
Wells Cathedral	Wells	Somerset	Sculpture	Set of Nativity and Epiphany figures in aluminium	1978-9	
St Leonard & St Jude	Scawsby, Doncaster	South Yorkshire	Sculpture		Unknown	
Chapel of Our Lady of Rotherham Bridge	Rotherham	South Yorkshire	Sculpture	Sculpture of Our Lady in aluminium	Unknown	
St Mary's	Hunslet, Leeds	West Yorkshire	Glass & Sculpture	A variety of pieces and schemes.		
All Hallows' Church	Hyde Park, Leeds	West Yorkshire	Furnishings	Three light fittings with lettering, in aluminium	Unknown	
All Hallows' Church	Hyde Park, Leeds	West Yorkshire	Glass	Stained-glass east window of the Risen Christ	Unknown	
St Peter's Church	Chippenham	Wiltshire	Glass	Comprehensive architectural glass scheme in collaboration with his wife, Nora	1968	
St John's	Parks, Swindon	Wiltshire	Sculpture			

=== Wales ===
Church/cathedral	Location	County or unitary authority	Category	Description	Date	Reference(s)
St Crallo's Church	Coychurch	Bridgend	Glass	Etched glass west windows	c. 1963	
Church of St Mary Magdalen	Kenfig	Bridgend	Glass	Stained glass in nave's south window	Unknown	
Church of St James	Pyle	Bridgend	Sculpture	Aluminium figure of Christ reigning from the Cross	Unknown	
St Martin's Church	Caerphilly	Caerphilly	Glass	St Francis window	1973	
St Ilan's Church	Eglwysilan	Caerphilly	Glass	Window in south nave, Saint John	1961	
Church of St Catwg	Gelligaer	Caerphilly	Glass	Stained glass in nave's north window	Unknown	
St Andrew's Church	Penyrheol	Caerphilly	Sculpture	Sculpture of Christ suspended over the high altar	Unknown	
St German's Church	Adamsdown	Cardiff	Sculpture	Wrought iron Crucifixion with Mary and John in the church forecourt	1965	
St John the Baptist Church	Cardiff city centre	Cardiff	Sculpture	Crucifixion with the Virgin Mary and St John in the Lady Chapel	1969	
Church of the Resurrection	Ely	Cardiff	Furnishings	Illuminated cross above the high altar and in the memorial chapel a screen and two sets of candlesticks	Unknown	
Church of the Resurrection	Ely	Cardiff	Sculpture	Aluminium crucifix in a memorial chapel	Unknown	
St Peter's Church	Fairwater	Cardiff	Sculpture	Vine Christ, sculpture in aluminium	1962	
St Dyfrig & St Samson	Grangetown	Cardiff	Sculpture	Aluminium crucifix in the churchyard	Unknown	
St Denys Church	Lisvane	Cardiff	Sculpture	Stone Memorial Cross in the churchyard	1964	
St Denys Church	Lisvane	Cardiff	Furnishings	Two candlesticks and bookrest in aluminium, seat and inbuilt credence table and marble altar (Roper design)	1979	
St Denys Church	Lisvane	Cardiff	Sculpture	Reredos in gilded aluminium - Christ figure with four Passion-nail shaped candle-holders	1979	
Howell's School	Llandaff	Cardiff	Sculpture	Exterior: Statue of Our Lady in a niche	Unknown	
Llandaff Cathedral	Llandaff	Cardiff	Sculpture	Twelve gilded bronze panels of Welsh flowers mounted on the medieval reredos of the Lady Chapel	1964	
Llandaff Cathedral	Llandaff	Cardiff	Sculpture	Six bronze plaques commemorating Saint Teilo	1973	
Llandaff Cathedral	Llandaff	Cardiff	Lettering	George Pace memorial - gilt bronze lettering (South Choir Aisle)	1978	
Llandaff Cathedral	Llandaff	Cardiff	Sculpture	Bronze sculpture in the Lady Chapel of St Francis preaching to the birds	1991	
Llandaff Cathedral	Llandaff	Cardiff	Lettering	Panel of lettering in the Welch Regimental Chapel - aluminium	Unknown	
Chapel of St Michael's College	Llandaff	Cardiff	Sculpture	Winged figure of St Michael with a sword, standing over the devil - exterior of the west wall	Unknown	
St Faith's Church	Llanishen	Cardiff	Furnishings	Two tall candlestick in aluminium	Unknown	
St Faith's Church	Llanishen	Cardiff	Sculpture	Crucifix in aluminium fixed to interior glass	Unknown	
Christ Church	Roath Park	Cardiff	Sculpture	Aluminium Crucifix in the church forecourt, 1.2 metres high	1964	
Christ Church	Roath Park	Cardiff	Lettering	Lettering in aluminium: 'Christ Church Parish Church', outside wall of the Lady Chapel (1997)	1997	
Christ Church	Roath Park	Cardiff	Furnishings	Multiple furnishings, mostly in aluminium. Inside: High altar (concrete), support for missal stand, two candlesticks (1964); Lady Chapel altar (concrete), support for missal stand (1964); Processional cross; Altar canopy with inlaid lights; Pulpit balustrade and reading lamp; Small coat of arms; Supports for credence table and flower pot shelf; Confessional desk with frame; Sacristy bell (1998); Font and font cover (1964); Font ewer (tall jug with lid) (1964); Two hymn number stands (1964 and 1994); Two churchwarden wands (1986); Sacristy room: crucifix (bronze with copper escutcheon) and Holy Water scoop (1998) Outside: Memorial garden bronze plaque (1997); Church notice board; Creation plaque, with four sections	1964-1998	
Christ Church	Roath Park	Cardiff	Sculpture	Sanctuary Crucifix in bronze, placed above the pulpit (height 1.22m)	Early 1980s	
Christ Church	Roath Park	Cardiff	Sculpture	Figure depicting Christ in Majesty inset in temple-style frame, aluminium	Unknown	
St Martin's Church	Roath	Cardiff	Sculpture	Aluminium, Stations of the Cross	1959	
St Martin's Church	Roath	Cardiff	Sculpture	Wood carving of St Martin and the Beggar	1956/7	
St Martin's Church	Roath	Cardiff	Furnishings	Two aluminium candlesticks positioned either side of a Roper crucifix (east wall of north aisle)	Unknown	
St Martin's Church	Roath	Cardiff	Lettering	'I am the living bread'': Reredos consisting of lettering mounted on wall, east wall of the chancel	Unknown	
St Martin's Church	Roath	Cardiff	Sculpture	Aluminium crucifix with two pieces placed either side suggesting thorns and berries (east wall of north aisle)	Unknown	
St Augustine's Church	Rumney	Cardiff	Glass	Representation of Virgin and Child, internal glass panel	1969	
St Saviour's Church	Splott	Cardiff	Glass	Two windows in the north aisle	1964	
St Saviour's Church	Splott	Cardiff	Sculpture	Aluminium, Stations of the Cross	1964	
St Michael and All Angels	Tongwynlais	Cardiff	Glass	Stained glass - east window	Unknown	
Church of Our Lady Queen of Peace	Newcastle Emlyn	Carmarthenshire	Glass	Architectural stained glass windows depicting the Stations of the Cross (north, south and east walls of the nave)	1971-73	
Church of Our Lady Queen of Peace	Newcastle Emlyn	Carmarthenshire	Glass	'The Resurrection' - stained glass window in the entrance hall	1973	
Priory Church of St Mary	Abergavenny	Monmouthshire	Sculpture	Crucifix	Unknown	
Church of St Mary	Margam	Neath Port Talbot	Sculpture	Aluminium hanging rood	Unknown	
The Church of St Thomas	Neath	Neath Port Talbot	Glass	Stained glass window depicting the martyrdom of St Thomas Becket	1971	
St David's Church	Neath	Neath Port Talbot	Glass	Two stained glass windows of musical angels	1981	
The Church of St Peter and St Paul	Neath	Neath Port Talbot	Furnishings	Mother's Union banner in aluminium, featuring four flowers associated with the Virgin Mary with their Welsh names	Unknown	
Holy Trinity Church	Christchurch	Newport	Furnishings	Candlestick and crucifix in aluminium	Unknown	
St Bride's Roman Catholic Church	Saundersfoot	Pembrokeshire	Sculpture	Crucifix on the roof	Unknown	
St Davids Cathedral	St Davids	Pembrokeshire	Furnishings	Lady chapel screen	1973	
St Mary's Church	Talbenny	Pembrokeshire	Glass	Windows depicting the Resurrection, St David and St Bride	Unknown	
St Mary's Church	Talbenny	Pembrokeshire	Sculpture	Virgin and child - figure in aluminium	1970s	
St Issui's Church	Partrishow	Powys	Sculpture	Figure of Saint Issui in aluminium	1995	
Church of St Illtyd	Llantwit Fardre	Rhondda Cynon Taf	Glass	Christ in Majesty stained glass window	1974	
Church of St Matthew	Trallwn, Pontypridd (Note: Newman in The Buildings of Wales: Glamorgan surmises that the reredos was by Roper. The church is closed and the present whereabouts of the reredos is unknown. The presence of a reredos with copper silhouettes of Christ and the twelve Apostles had been noted by Coflein.)	Rhondda Cynon Taf	Sculpture	Christ with the Twelve Apostles metal reredos	dedicated 1962	
Christ Church	Ynysybwl	Rhondda Cynon Taf	Glass	Christ surrounded by a crown of thorns stained glass east window	Unknown	
St Peter's Church	Blaenavon	Torfaen	Glass	Stained glass windows	Unknown	
All Saints Church	Barry	Vale of Glamorgan	Glass	Sanctuary window Supper at Emmaus	c. 1971	
St Tydfil's Church	Llysworney	Vale of Glamorgan	Glass	Christ as King and as Good Shepherd semi-abstract stained glass with thickenings	1972	
Church of St Michael and All Angels	Michaelston-le-Pit	Vale of Glamorgan	Glass	Windows of seasons in flowers in the Chancel	c. 1986	
All Saints	Penarth	Vale of Glamorgan	Glass	Two-light window with standing figures of St Clare and St Francis, set in a landscape with flowers. Crucifixion above and texts below in separate panels	1987	
St Augustine's	Penarth	Vale of Glamorgan	Furnishings	Pulpit rail, depicting flowers, lettering and an open bible	Unknown	
St Augustine's	Penarth	Vale of Glamorgan	Sculpture	Sculpture of St Augustine in aluminium	Unknown	
Church of St Mary	Penmark	Vale of Glamorgan	Sculpture	Bronze figure of the Virgin Mary	Unknown	
St John the Baptist	Sully	Vale of Glamorgan	Glass	Stained glass window	Unknown	
Church of St Mary	Wenvoe	Vale of Glamorgan	Glass	Stained glass window above the doors to the tower, depicting the Virgin and Child framed in a Jesse tree	1981	

== Sources ==
- Newman, John (2001), The Buildings of Wales: Glamorgan, Penguin Books, ISBN 0-14-071056-6
- Leech, Peter (2003). The Religious Art of Frank Roper – An Introduction. Much Wenlock: RJL Smith & Associates, for The Roper Exhibition Group. ISBN 1-872665-74-8.
