= Marshfield railway station =

Disused railway station in Wales

Marshfield
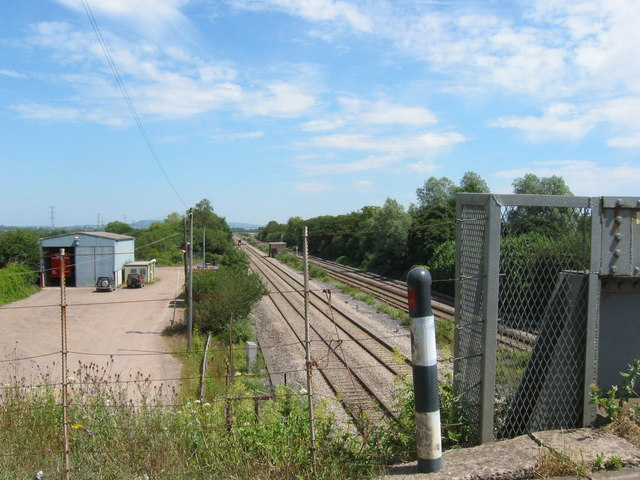
- Site of station in 2006

General information
- Location: Newport, Cardiff; Wales
- Coordinates: 51.5299°N 3.0585°W
- Platforms: 2

Other information
- Status: Disused

History
- Original company: South Wales Railway

Key dates
- 2 September 1850: opened
- 10 August 1959: closed to passengers
- 4 January 1965: closed to goods
Location

Marshfield railway station was a former station on the South Wales Main Line which served Marshfield, Newport, in South Wales.

== History and description ==
The station opened in 1850. The service at Marshfield was always modest, with just three trains per day in 1869. Relief lines at Marshfield were completed in stages between 1896 and 1898. The station had 13 to 14 employees in the 1930s.

Marshfield had two platforms, each with a brick building. The buildings had wooden awnings to provide shelter. There was a 39-lever signal box which opened in 1897 and closed in 1963.

The station closed to passengers in 1959, before the Beeching Axe. There is no longer any station in the area.

== After closure ==
After closure, the 'down' platform was removed, but the 'up' platform, complete with its iron gate, lasted for many years longer.

Preceding station	Historical railways	Following station
Roath; Line open, station closed	Great Western Railway; South Wales Railway	Newport; Line & station open
