= HMS Thisbe (1824) =

British Leda-class fifth-rate frigate

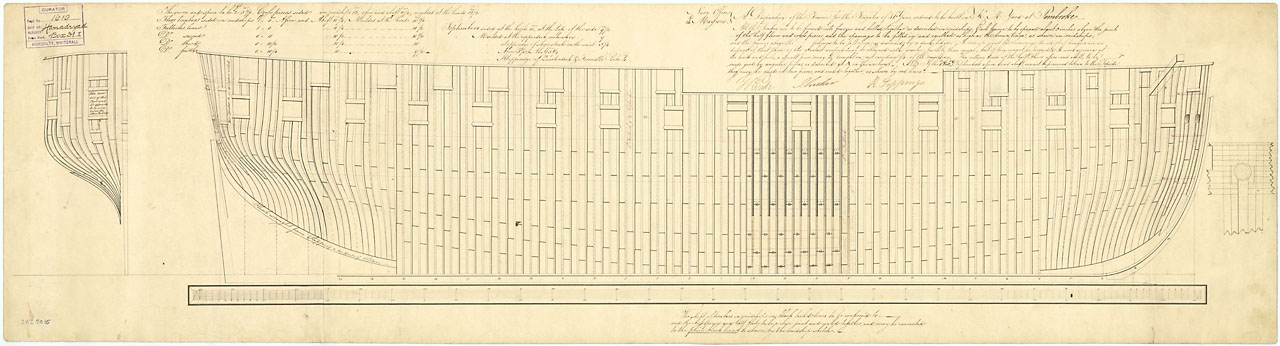
- Thisbe

History

United Kingdom
- Name: Thisbe
- Namesake: Thisbe
- Ordered: 23 July 1817
- Builder: Pembroke Dockyard
- Laid down: November 1820
- Launched: 9 September 1824
- Completed: 12 September 1821
- Commissioned: Never
- Reclassified: As depot ship, 1850
- Fate: Sold for scrap, 11 August 1892

General characteristics
- Class & type: Modified Leda-class frigate
- Tons burthen: 1082 67/94 bm
- Length: 151 ft 9 in (46.3 m) (gundeck); 127 ft (38.7 m) (keel)
- Beam: 40 ft 4 in (12.3 m)
- Draught: 15 ft 4 in (4.7 m)
- Depth: 12 ft 9 in (3.9 m)
- Sail plan: Full-rigged ship
- Complement: 315
- Armament: 46 guns: Upper gundeck: 28 × 18-pdr cannon; Quarterdeck: 14 × 32-pdr carronades; Forecastle: 2 × 9-pdr cannon and 2 × 32-pdr carronades

HMS Thisbe was a 46-gun modified Leda-class fifth-rate frigate built for the Royal Navy during the 1820s. The ship was never commissioned and spent her entire career in reserve or on third-line duties. She was converted into a depot ship in 1850 and then into a floating church in 1863. Thisbe was replaced by a shore-based establishment, All Souls Chapel, in 1891 and sold for scrap the following year.

== Description ==
Thisbe had a length at the gundeck of 151 feet 9 inches (46.3 m) and 127 feet (38.7 m) at the keel. She had a beam of 40 feet 4 inches (12.3 m), a draught of 15 feet 4 inches (4.7 m) and a depth of hold of 12 feet 9 inches (3.9 m). The ship's tonnage was 1082 67/94 tons burthen. The modified Leda-class frigates were armed with twenty-eight 18-pounder cannon on her gundeck, fourteen 32-pounder carronades on her quarterdeck and a pair of 9-pounder cannon and two more 32-pounder carronades in forecastle. The ship had a crew of 315 officers and ratings.

== Construction and career ==
Thisbe, the second ship of her name to serve in the Royal Navy, was ordered on 23 July 1817, laid down in August 1820 at Pembroke Dockyard, Wales, and launched on 9 September 1824. She was completed for ordinary at Plymouth Dockyard on 5 October 1824 and the ship was roofed over from the mainmast forward. Thisbe was converted for service as a depot ship from 1850–63 and was loaned to the Missions to Seamen on 13 August of that year as a floating church; Lord Bute paid for the necessary modifications. The ship spent almost the next 30 years berthed at the Bute West Dock in Cardiff. Thisbe was taken out of service in 1891 and sold to W. H. Caple for £1,005 on 11 August 1892. All Souls Chapel was built nearby in 1892 as a replacement.

Another redundant Leda-class frigate, HMS Hamadryad, was also moored in Cardiff and used as a hospital ship from 1866 to 1905.
