= All Souls Chapel (Cardiff) =

Church in Wales

All Souls
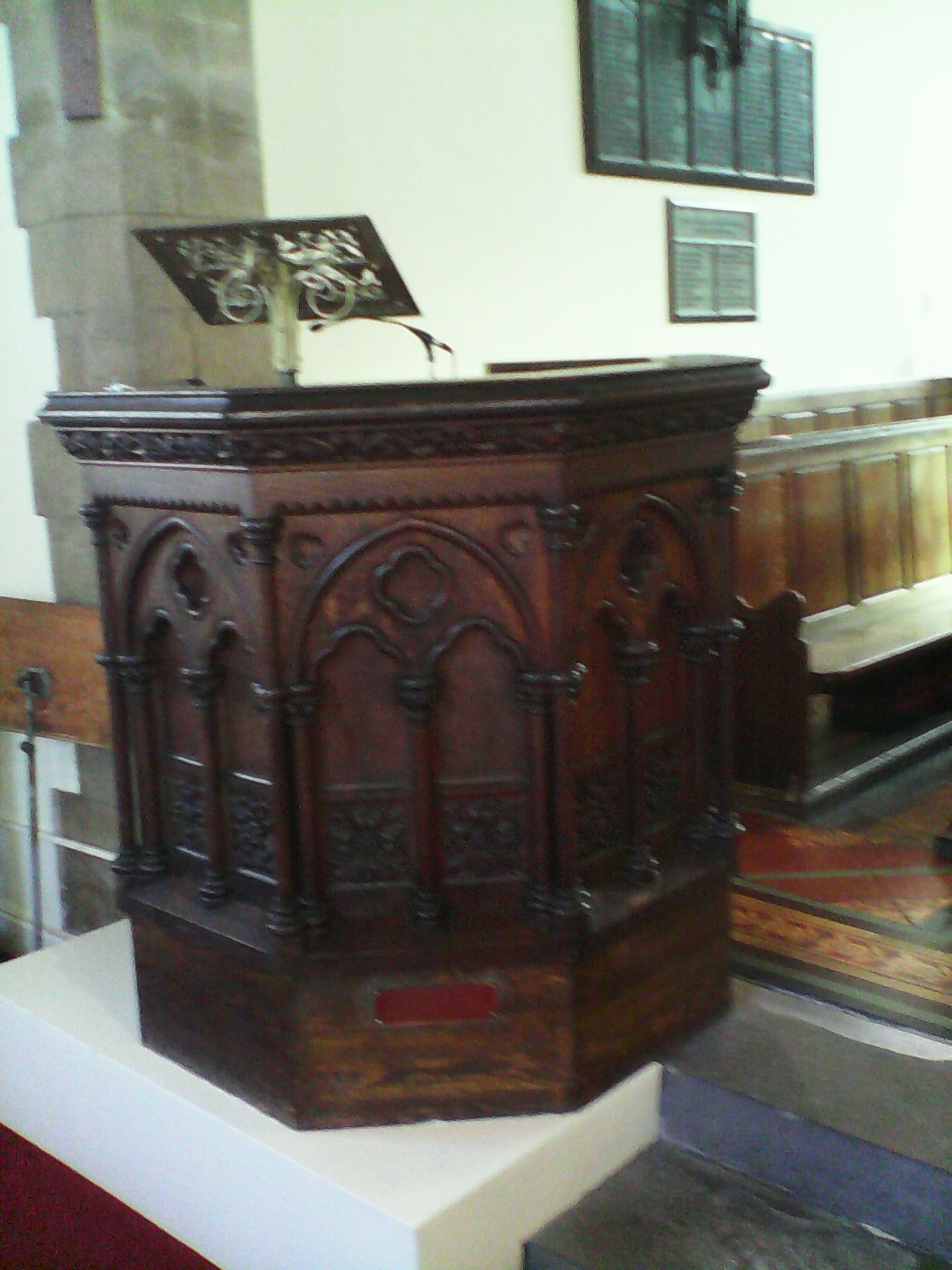
- The surviving All Souls pulpit, now in St Edward's, Roath.
- All Souls
- 51.4646°N 3.1649°W
- Denomination: Church in Wales

History
- Status: Demolished
- Dedication: All Souls
- Dedicated: 25 November 1891

Architecture
- Architect: E.W.M. Corbett
- Completed: 1891
- Construction cost: £5000
- Closed: 1952
- Demolished: April 1987

Specifications
- Capacity: 450
- Materials: stone

Administration
- Diocese: Diocese of Llandaff

All Souls Chapel also known as the Seamen's Institute and later as Merton House was a large chapel which stood at Cardiff Docks, near the present Roald Dahl Plass.

== History ==
Since 1863, HMS Thisbe had served as a floating church operated by the Mission to Seamen (now the Mission to Seafarers), being moored at Cardiff's West Dock. In 1891, the ship was replaced with All Souls Chapel, still operated by the Mission. The building work was funded largely by public subscription, with the Bute Docks Company donating £1000 of the £5000 cost, and the site being donated by the Marquis of Bute. The building was designed by E. W. M. Corbett, the architect to the Bute estates, and was built of ballast stone with brick facings, resembling a conventional church in the Gothic Revival style, but within, was divided into two floors, with the ground floor housing the Institute, a library and reading room for mariners, the chaplain's room, caretaker's apartments and entrance hall. The first floor was given over to worship, housing the church itself, which could seat 450 people. The Institute was opened on 19 November 1891, with the church being dedicated soon after on 25th. In the following decade, the building underwent a £750 renovation, and was reopened by the Viscount Tredegar on 1 May 1906.

The economic fortunes of the area declined in the postwar years, and All Souls closed in 1952. The building was subsequently converted into a commercial premises, and was used by the analytical chemists Treharne & Davies Ltd, under whose ownership it was renamed Merton House, before eventual demolition in 1987 as part of a redevelopment project. No trace of the building remains today.

== Pulpit ==
The pulpit from All Souls was removed following the building's cessation as a church, and is now located in St Edward's Church, Roath. It was installed in 1953, a gift by the family of Rev. Ken Martin, who was the assistant priest at St Edwards for many years.
