= Roath railway station =

Former railway station in Wales

Coordinates: 51.4848°N 3.1537°W

Roath
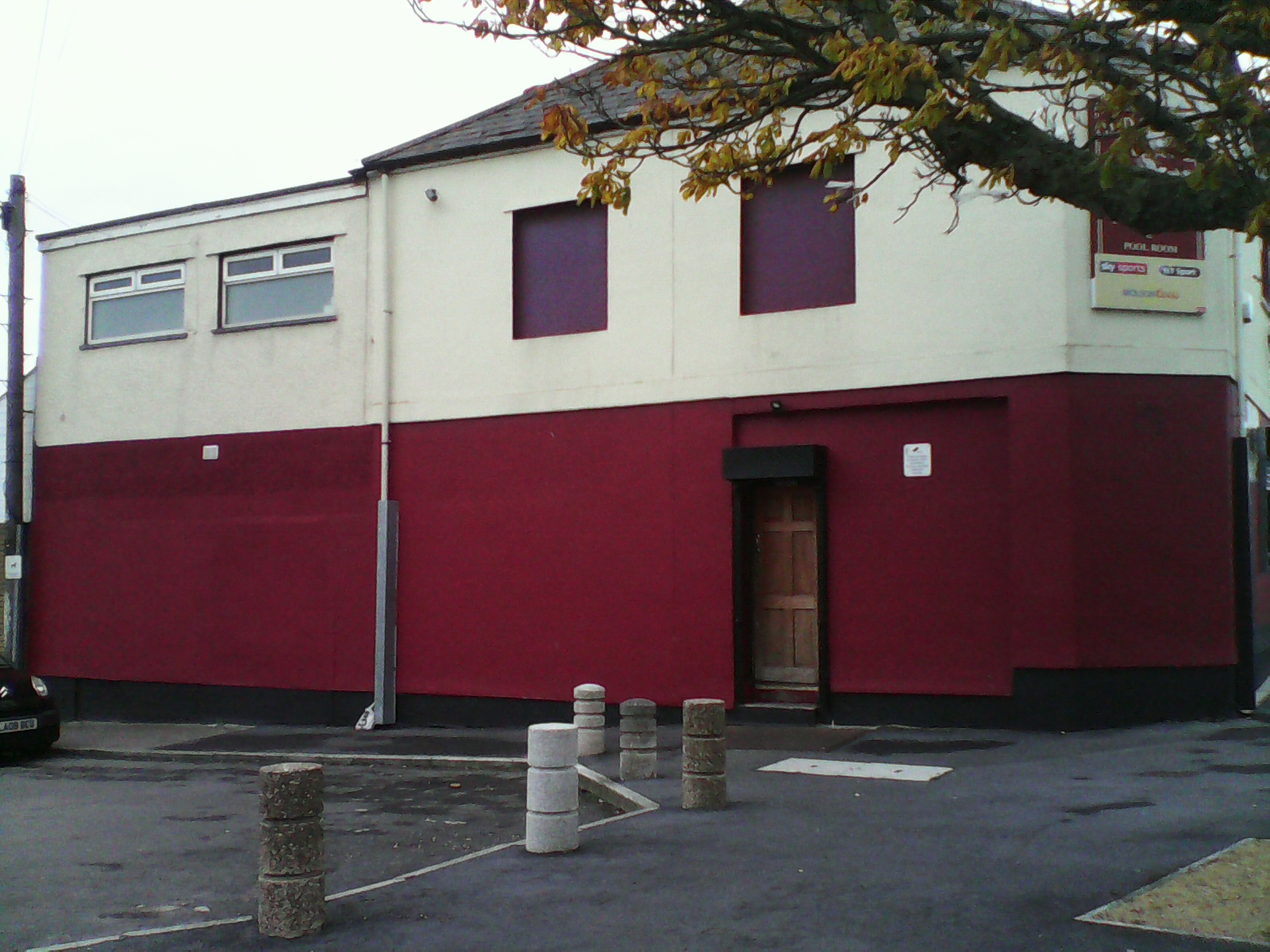
- The station site in 2018

General information
- Location: Roath, Cardiff; Wales
- Platforms: 2

Other information
- Status: Disused

History
- Original company: Great Western Railway

Key dates
- 1899: opened
- 2 April 1917: closed
Location

Roath railway station was a short-lived railway station in Cardiff. It opened in 1899 and closed in 1917. The station was on the South Wales Main Line, with Roath to the north and Splott to the south.

The southerly section of Roath, to the North of the railway line, is now officially part of Adamsdown. It is often incorrectly referred to as Splott, the entirely of which is actually located to the south of the railway line.

== Description ==
Roath was a substantial station, having two platforms, each covered by a large wooden awning. During the First World War, the station was used as a reception centre for wounded troops, who were taken to the nearby Splotlands Board School, which was then in use as a hospital.

== Closure ==
After the station closed on 2 April 1917, the buildings fell into disrepair and became heavily vandalised. The building which fronted the street was later used by the Splott & District Amateur Operatic Society, who used it as a workshop for building scenery and props. The building was later demolished altogether. The site is now occupied by an extension of the Old Illtydians RFC. Trains still pass the site of the old station, but there is no longer any station in the area.

Preceding station	Historical railways	Following station
Cardiff Central; Line and station open	Great Western Railway; South Wales Railway	Marshfield; Line open, station closed
