= St Edward's Church, Roath =

Church in Cardiff, Wales

St Edward the Confessor
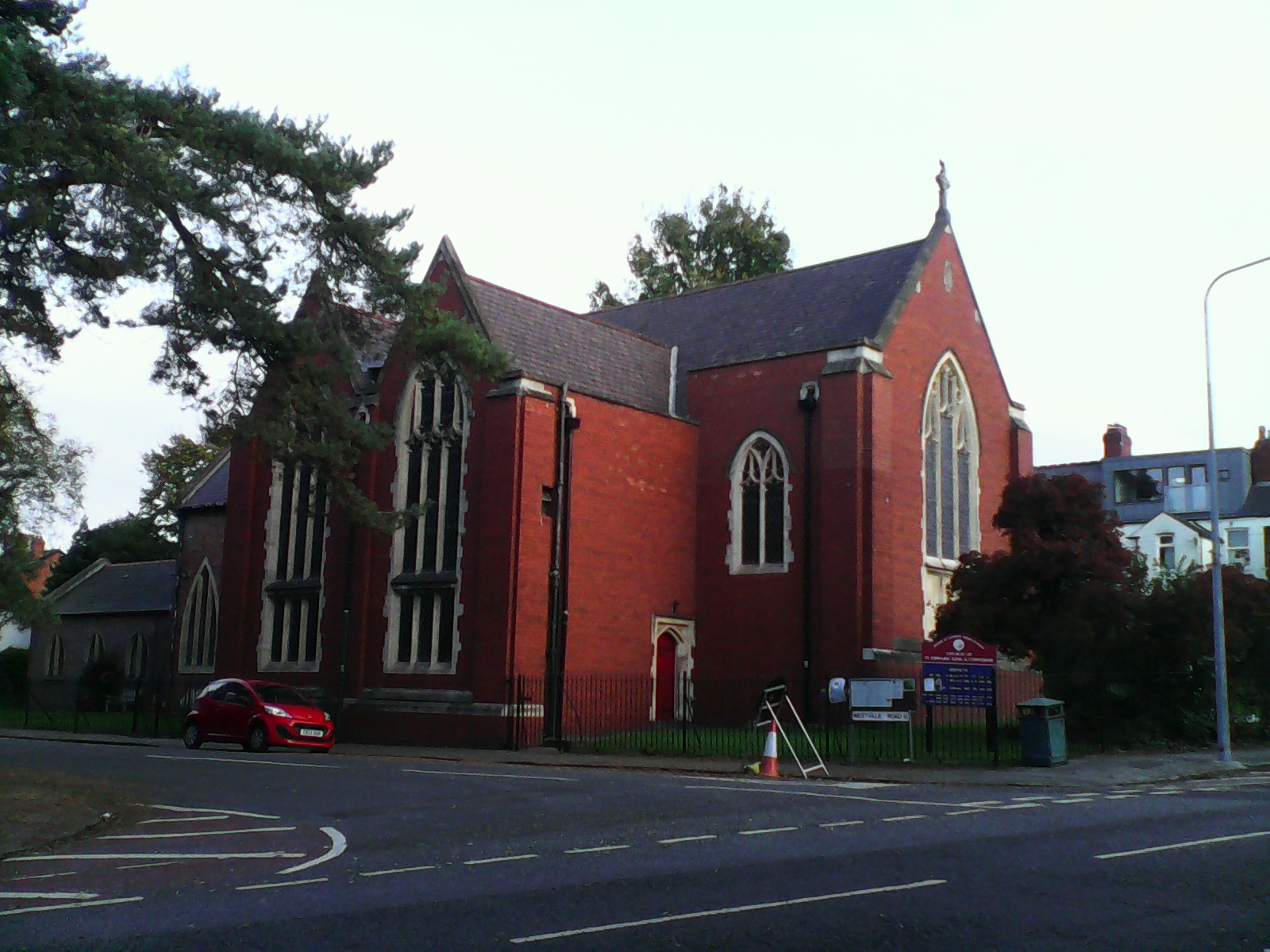
- St Edwards in 2017
- St Edward the Confessor
- 51.4960°N 3.1599°W
- Denomination: Church in Wales

History
- Status: Active
- Dedication: Edward the Confessor

Architecture
- Functional status: Daughter church
- Architect(s): Willmott & Smith
- Completed: 1915

Specifications
- Materials: brick

Administration
- Diocese: Diocese of Llandaff
- Parish: Roath

St Edward's Church is a Church in Wales church in Penylan, Cardiff, South Wales. It is a part of the Ministry Area of Roath and Cathays, alongside St Margaret's Church, Roath, St Martin's Church, Roath, St German's Church, Adamsdown and St Michael's Church, Cathays. It was previously in the Parish of Roath as a daughter church of St Margaret's Church, the only one remaining in use after the closure of St Anne's in 2015.

== History ==
=== Structure of 1915 ===
A product of the Oxford Movement, St Edward's was originally constructed in 1915, as a tin tabernacle, one of several in Cardiff at the time. The original structure unconventionally faced the west (rather than the east as is usual in churches). It opened in March 1915. On 11 September 1919, between midnight and 1 am, the church was almost completely destroyed by a fire, believed to have been caused by an electrical fault. Although the church was reduced to a wreck, many of the objects inside survived the blaze, including the communion vessels and 240 chairs. The remains of the building were demolished in 1919.

=== Structure of 1919 ===
The Parish of Roath decided to reconstruct the building in memory of the fallen of the First World War. A chancel of brick with sandstone embellishments was built by Willmott and Smith, but funds ran short, causing the nave to be constructed of galvanised iron. The new structure, unlike its predecessor, faced the east. A new organ, lectern, and vestments were soon provided. The large east window was added in later years, and the pulpit was added in 1953, having been salvaged from All Souls Chapel in Cardiff Docks, which had closed in 1952.

=== Reconstruction of 1968 ===
By the late 1960s, the iron nave of the church had fallen into a poor condition. In 1968, it was removed and replaced in brick by the original architects of the 1919 structure (though the brick nave was somewhat shorter than the tin one).

=== Extension of 1992 ===
In 1992, a brick extension to the church was added, providing a small vestibule, a washroom and a schoolroom. Previously the Sunday school had been held in the vestry.

== Bell ==
After the 1919 rebuilding, a bell was installed in 1922. This had been made in 1815, and is thought to have been made from a cannon used in the Battle of Waterloo. In 2015, the bell was taken down during repairs to the chancel, but was found to be in a very poor condition, and the church could not comfortably afford the repair bill. It was duly put into storage. In 2016, it was replaced with a smaller bell (dating from 1816).

== Activities ==
St Edward's has a long musical tradition. It has its own resident orchestra, conducted by Alison Dite and holds a music festival each October. It has also houses exhibitions of art and drama performances.

== Gallery ==
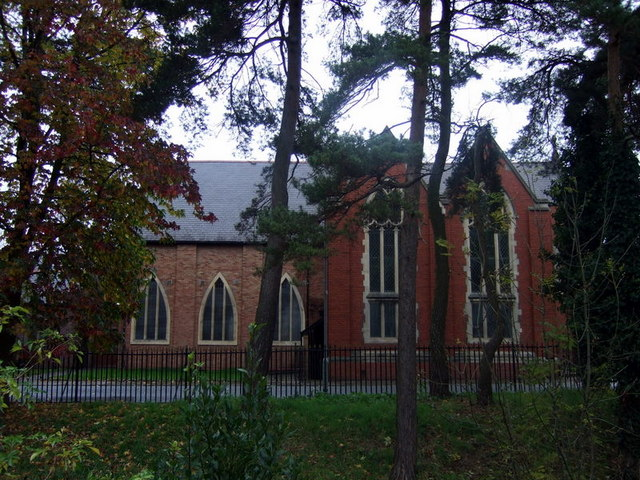
Church from Roath Brook Gardens

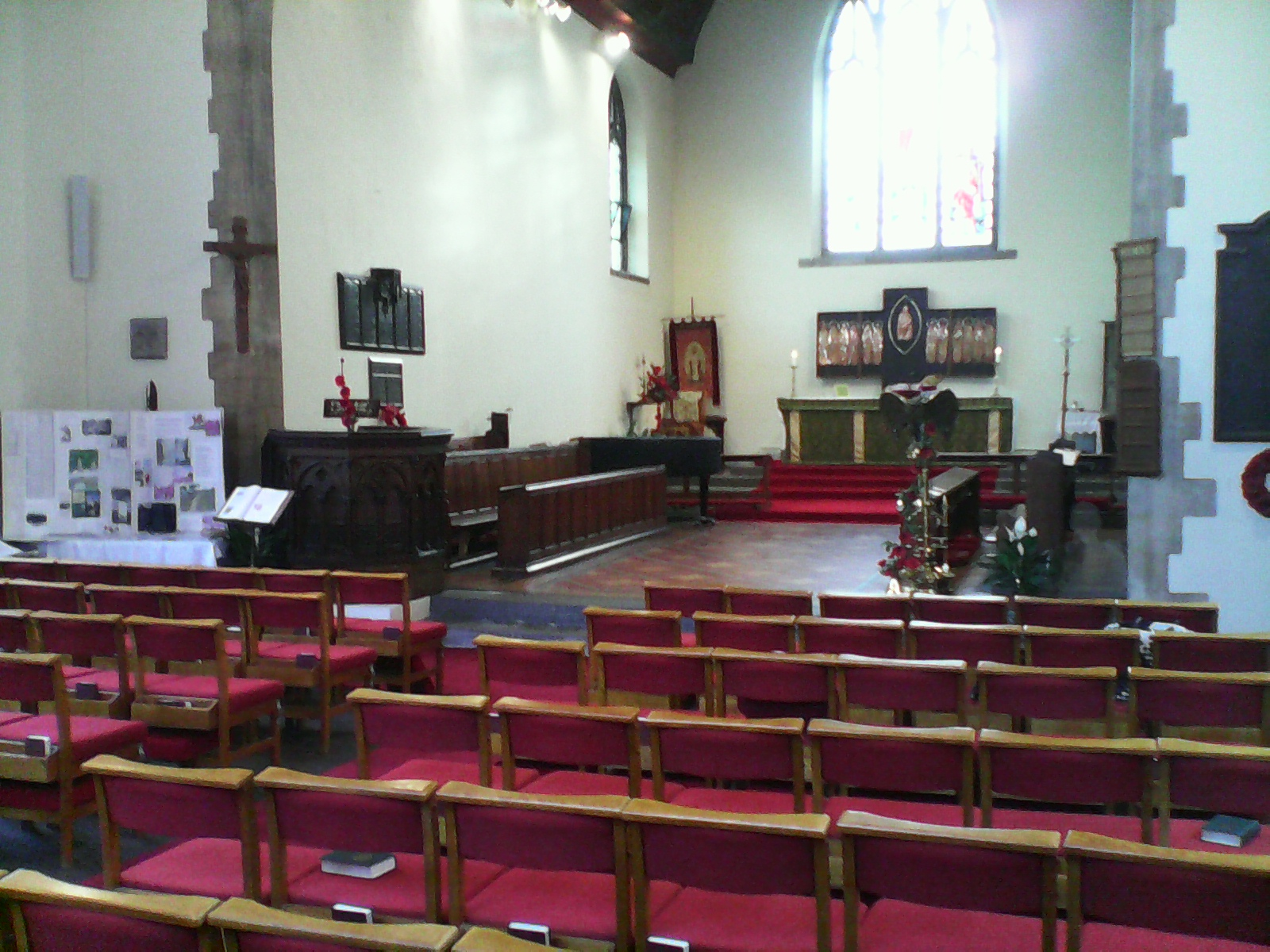
Interior, facing the chancel in 2018

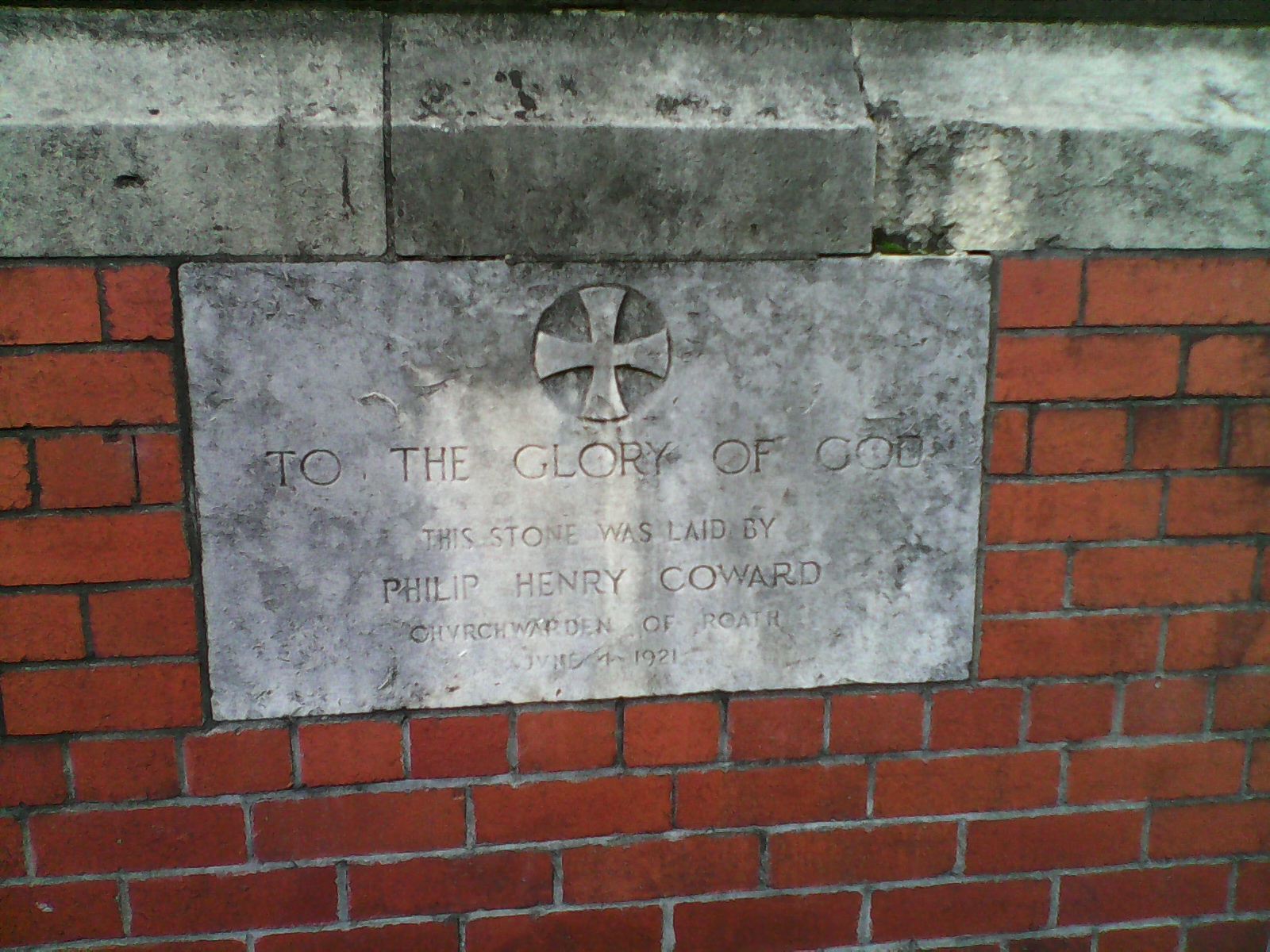
Stone laid after the 1919 rebuild, dated 4 June 1921

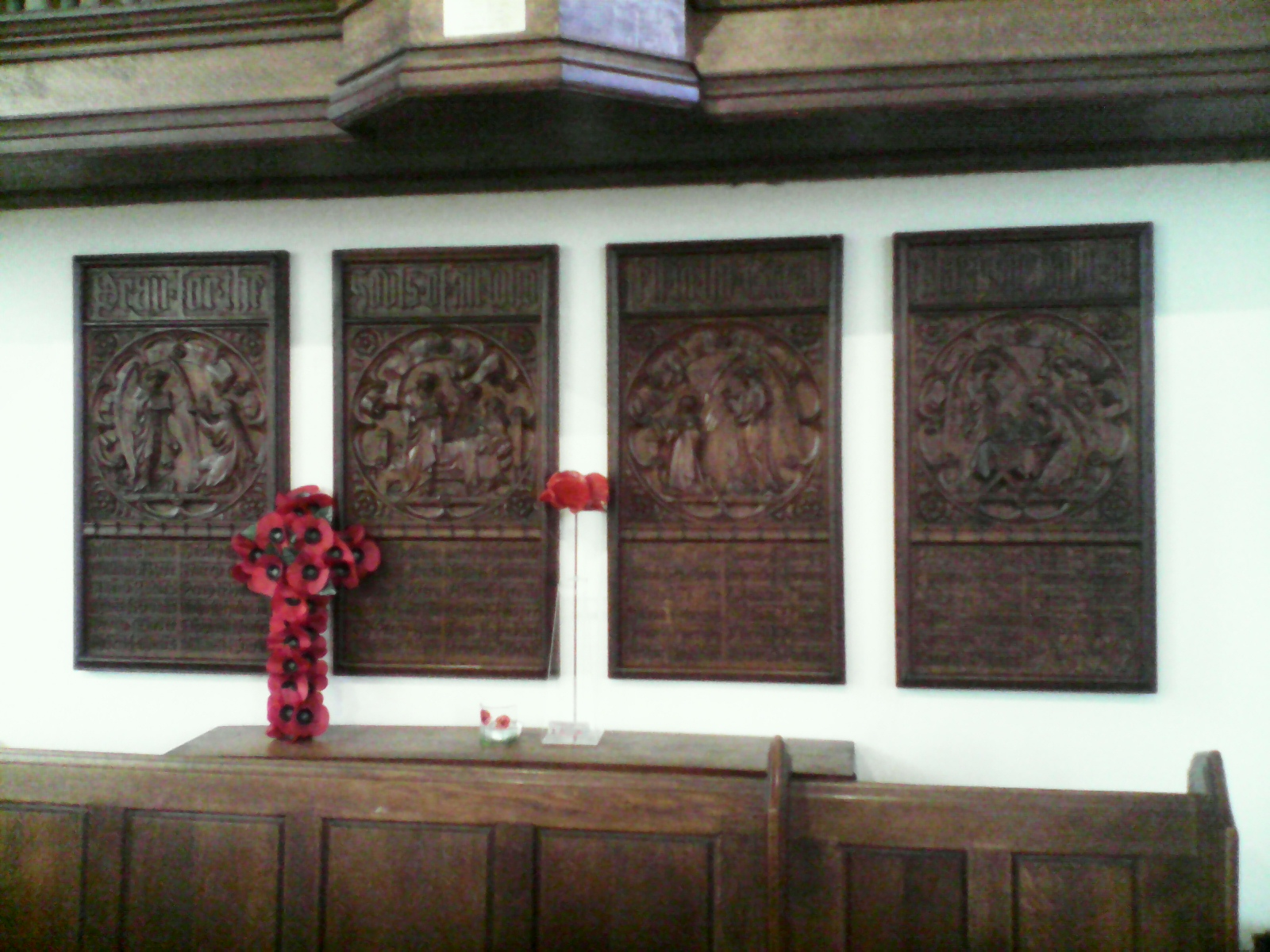
Wall panels made from the dismantled St Anne's pulpit

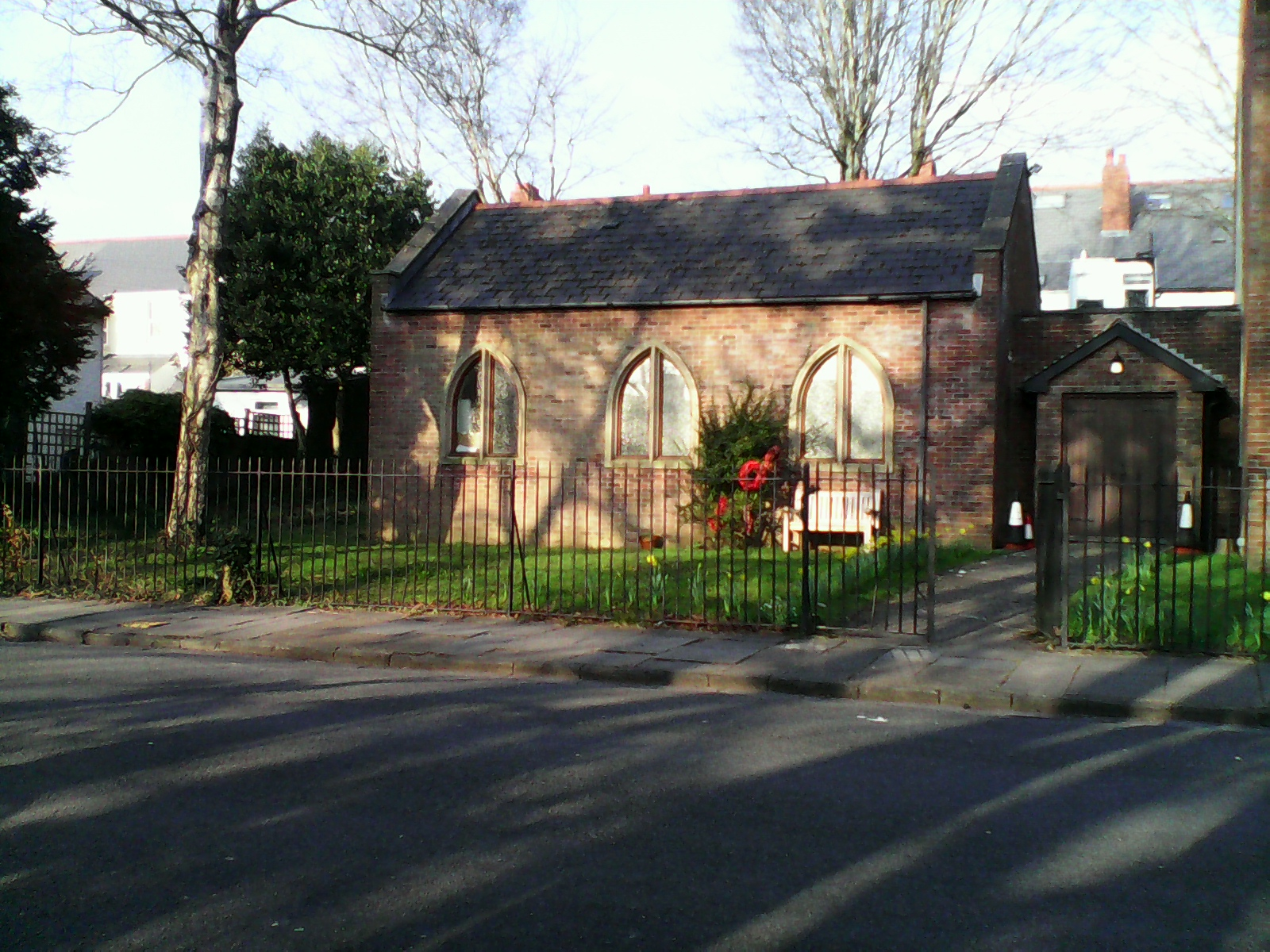
The 1992 extension
