= St Anne's Church, Roath =

Church in Cardiff, Wales

St Anne's, Roath
- Urban Crofters
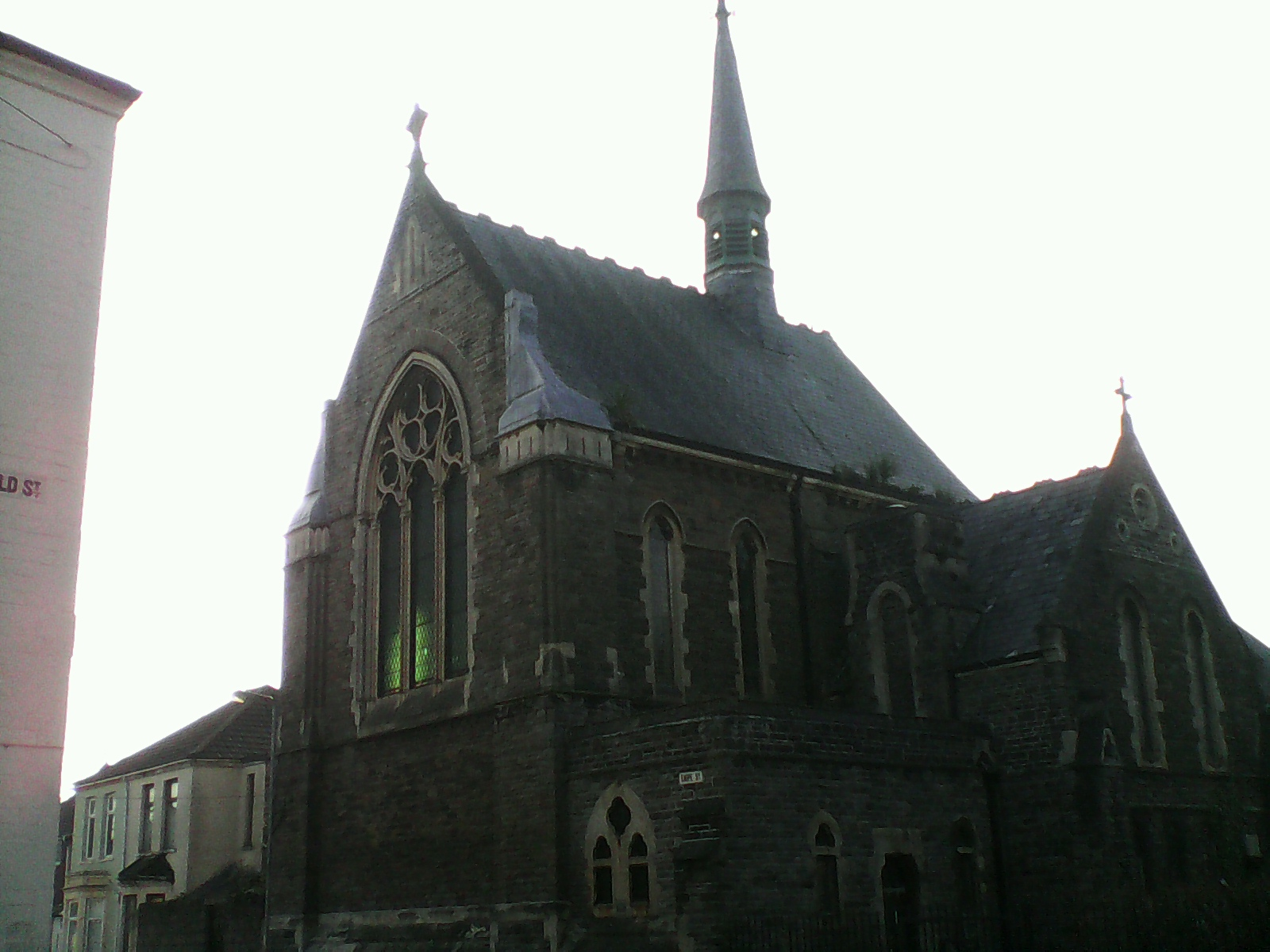
- The church in 2018
- St Anne's, Roath
- 51.4900°N 3.1639°W
- Denomination: Church in Wales

History
- Status: Active
- Founded: 1872
- Dedication: St Anne
- Consecrated: September 1887

Architecture
- Functional status: Daughter church
- Heritage designation: II
- Designated: 13 February 1992
- Architect: Joseph Arthur Reeve
- Style: Neo-Gothic
- Groundbreaking: 1886
- Completed: 1887
- Closed: 24 December 2015 (re-opened in January 2019)

Specifications
- Capacity: 350
- Materials: stone

Administration
- Diocese: Llandaff
- Parish: Roath

St Anne's Church, Roath is a formerly redundant church on the corner of Snipe Street and Croft Street, in Roath, Cardiff, Wales. It closed in 2015 after 128 years of worship and re-opened in 2019 hosting the Urban Crofters congregation.

== History ==
The church began in 1872 when the vicar of Roath, Reverend Puller, founded a school chapel, St Clement's, there. At the time, the district's population had grown from 300 to 9000 in twenty years, and the existing places of worship were no longer adequate. The founding stone of the present church was laid in 1886. The church was designed by J. A. Reeve, a pupil of William Burges. Reeve's original design was displayed at the Royal Academy Exhibition in 1887, but it proved unrealistically elaborate, and only the chancel and spire were built as intended, with the nave being of a plainer, more modest design than the original plans. Even so, the church's opening ceremony was attended by 500 people, who crowded into a space designed for 350. The north aisle was installed in 1891.

In 1904–1905 the church briefly operated a pub called The Moon and Stars located across the street. This project ceased when the church's vicar departed.

The south aisle was not built until 1937. In 1991, the half and single bay at the western end of the church were partitioned off to form a church hall.

== Decline and closure ==
St Anne's was never an affluent church. The area was not well-heeled, and even in the early years, there was competition from other churches in the district (most of which did not last as long). In 2000, a much-needed grant from the Lottery Heritage Fund was secured to repair the deteriorating roof, but the church continued to deteriorate in the following years. The adjoining church school closed in 2011 after 132 years, having only twenty pupils by this time. In 2015, the church's congregation had dwindled to around 12 and when it was learnt that the church required £250,000 worth of repairs, the decision was taken to close. The last service was held on Christmas Eve 2015.

== Reopening/Urban Crofters ==
In January 2019 the church was reopened as Urban Crofters, a new missional community church in the Church in Wales. Bishop June Osborne licensed the Revd. Will Souter as the vicar. Rev. Souter and his wife had attended St Anne's final service on Christmas Eve in 2015 before it closed down, and thought the building suitable for the needs of their new church. Bishop June created a new conventional district (a church without a geographical parish) based at St. Anne’s in January 2019. After eight months of practical preparations, two Sunday morning services were commenced in September 2019: a 9am Eucharist and a 10.30am informal service aiming at being accessible for guests.

Further refurbishment has been made to the building, in part funded by a grant from the James Pantyfedwen Foundation.
