= St Martin's Church, Roath =

Church in Cardiff, Wales

St Martin's Church
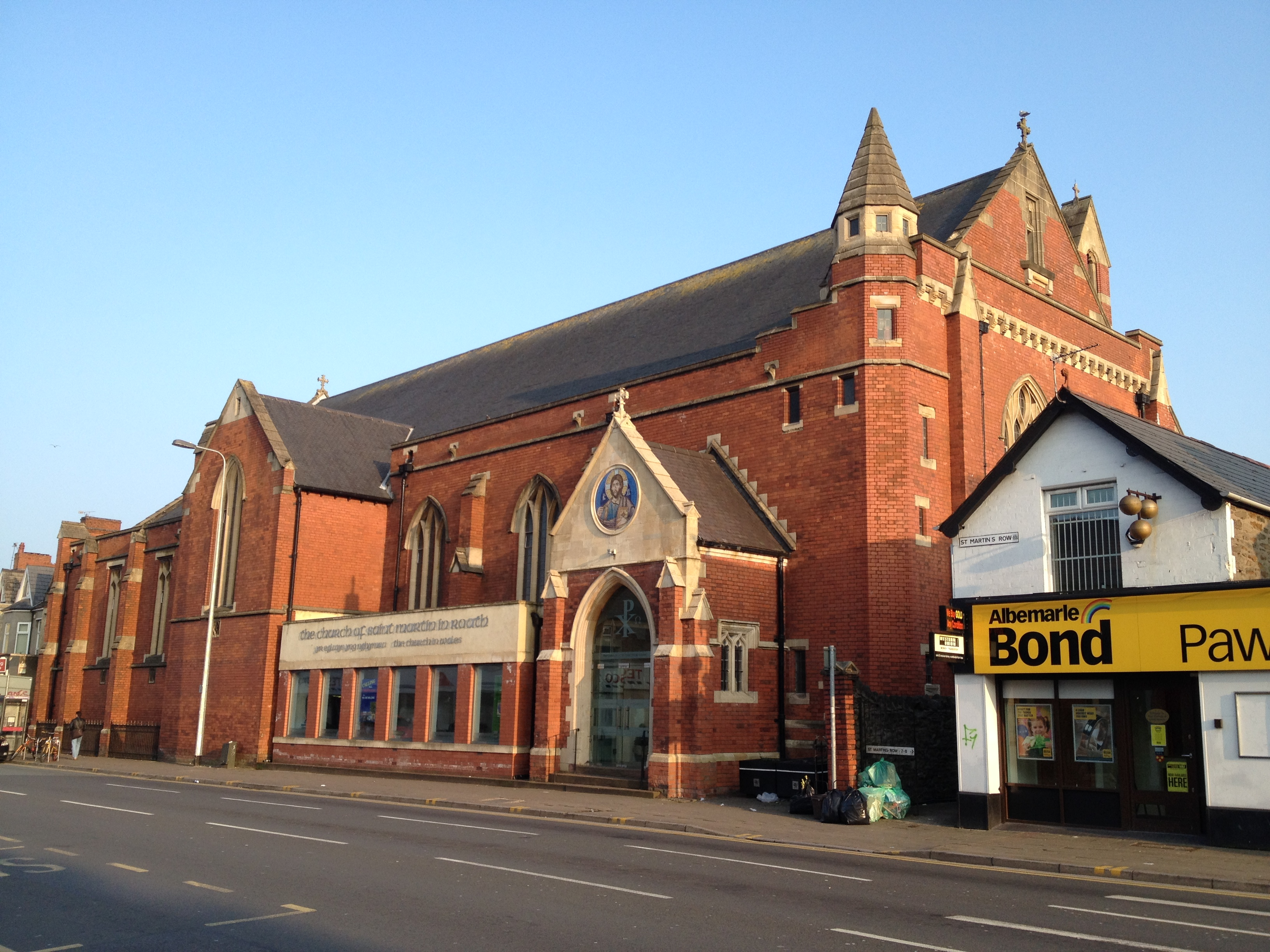
- St Martin's Church
- 51.4927°N 3.1708°W
- Denomination: Church in Wales
- Churchmanship: Anglo-Catholic

History
- Status: Active
- Founded: 1886
- Dedication: St Martin of Tours
- Consecrated: 20 October 1901

Architecture
- Functional status: Parish church
- Architect: F. R. Kempson
- Style: Neo-Gothic
- Groundbreaking: 16 December 1899
- Completed: 1901

Administration
- Diocese: Llandaff
- Deanery: Roath St Martin
- Parish: Roath St Martin

St Martin's Church is an Anglican church on Albany Road in Roath, Cardiff, Wales.

== History ==
Erected to serve what was then a growing suburb, the church was founded as a tin tabernacle in 1886. The present building replaced it in 1901, and the church became a separate parish in 1903. Its original lady chapel was decorated by a Belgian refugee artist in gratitude for the kindness shown by the parishioners during the First World War.

The original interior of the church was completely destroyed by an incendiary bomb in February 1941. Services were held in the surviving choir vestry and in the neighbouring St Cyprian's church until the building was restored in full in 1955. During the restoration, the ornate tracery of the original windows was replaced with a plainer lancet type to increase the amount of light allowed through them.

A new cloister fronting the street was consecrated by Archbishop Barry Morgan in 2011. In 2013 a mosaic of Christ Pantocrator by Aidan Hart was installed above the main entrance of the church. It was blessed by Rowan Williams, the former Archbishop of Canterbury.

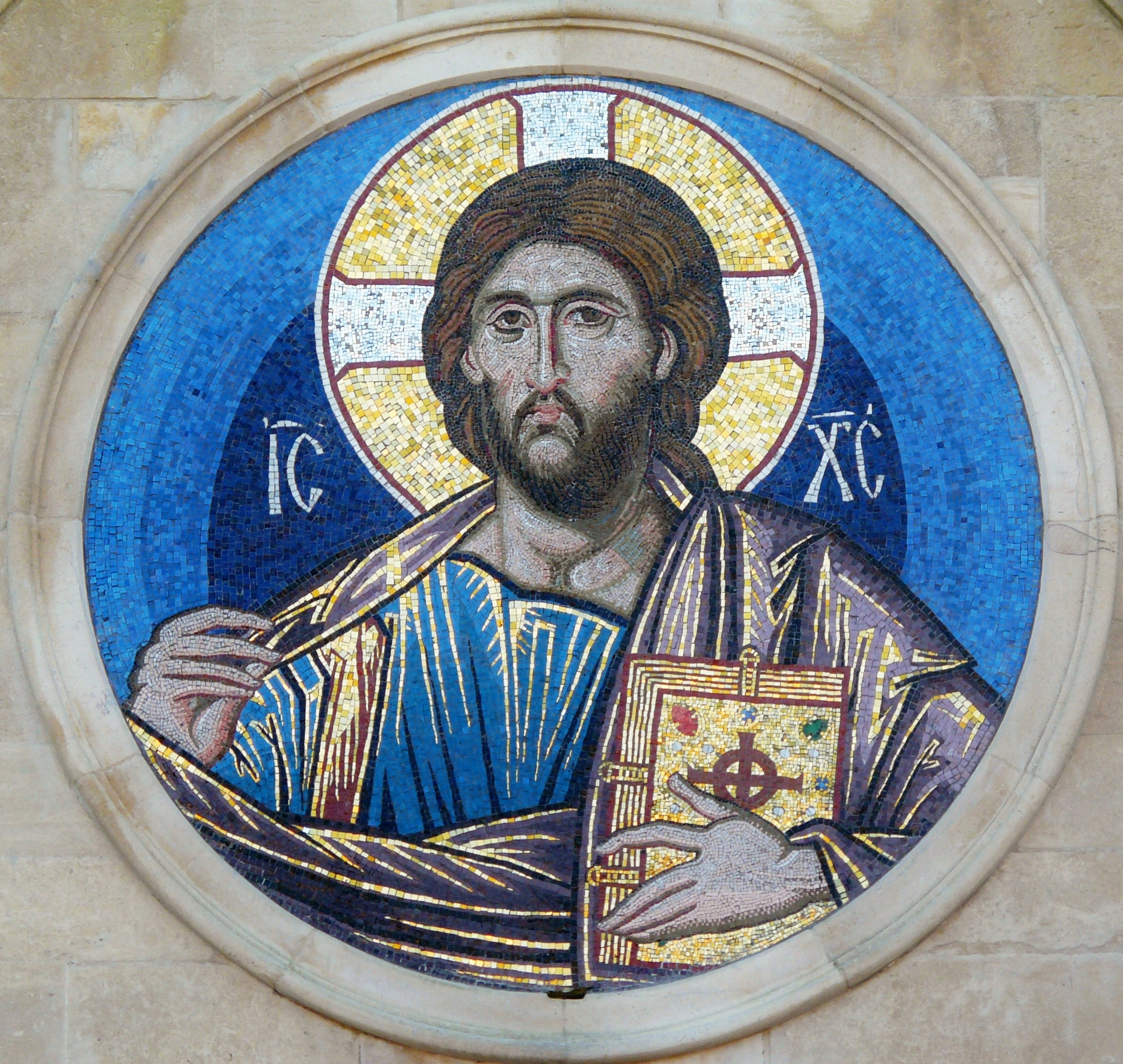
Mosaic of Christ Pantocrator at St Martin's Church
