= St German's Church =

Church in Cardiff, Wales

- Eglwys Sant Garmon
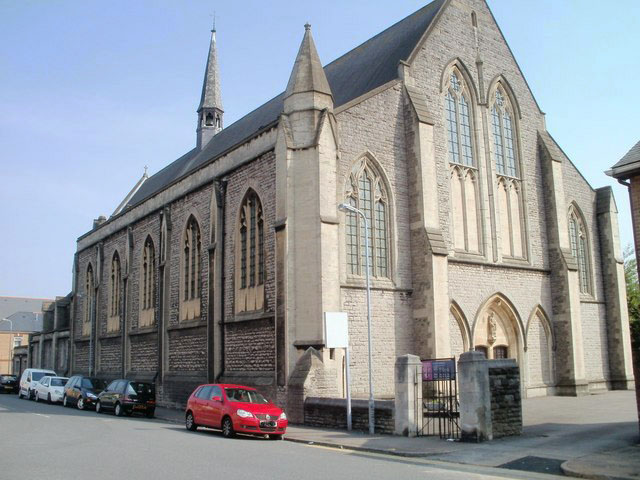
- St German's Church, Star Street

- Location within Cardiff

General information
- Architectural style: Gothic Revival
- Location: Cardiff, Wales
- Coordinates: 51°29′4″N 3°9′34″W
- Construction started: 1881
- Completed: 1884
- Cost: £5000

Design and construction
- Architect: Bodley & Garner

St German's Church (Welsh: Eglwys Sant Garmon) is a nineteenth-century Church in Wales parish church in Adamsdown, Cardiff, Wales dedicated to St Germanus of Auxerre, (the Garmon Sant of Welsh tradition). The building, located on the corner of Star Street and Metal Street, is a Grade I Listed building.

== History and architecture ==
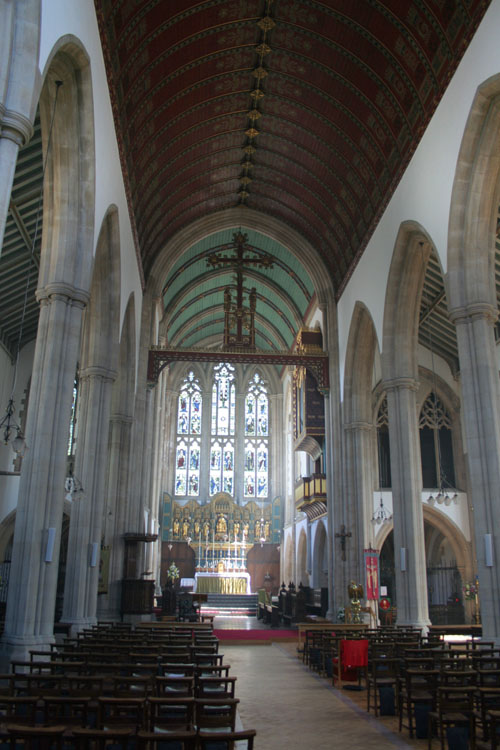
Church interior, nave and chancel

The first church in this locality was established in 1857 in a converted barn and was known as Splott Chapel and as Christ Church. In 1874 this was replaced by a second-hand building made of iron. The population was growing rapidly and this building soon became inadequate. By 1881 the parish had raised €5,000 to build a new church. Lord Tredegar donated the land and laid the foundation stone of the new church in April 1882.

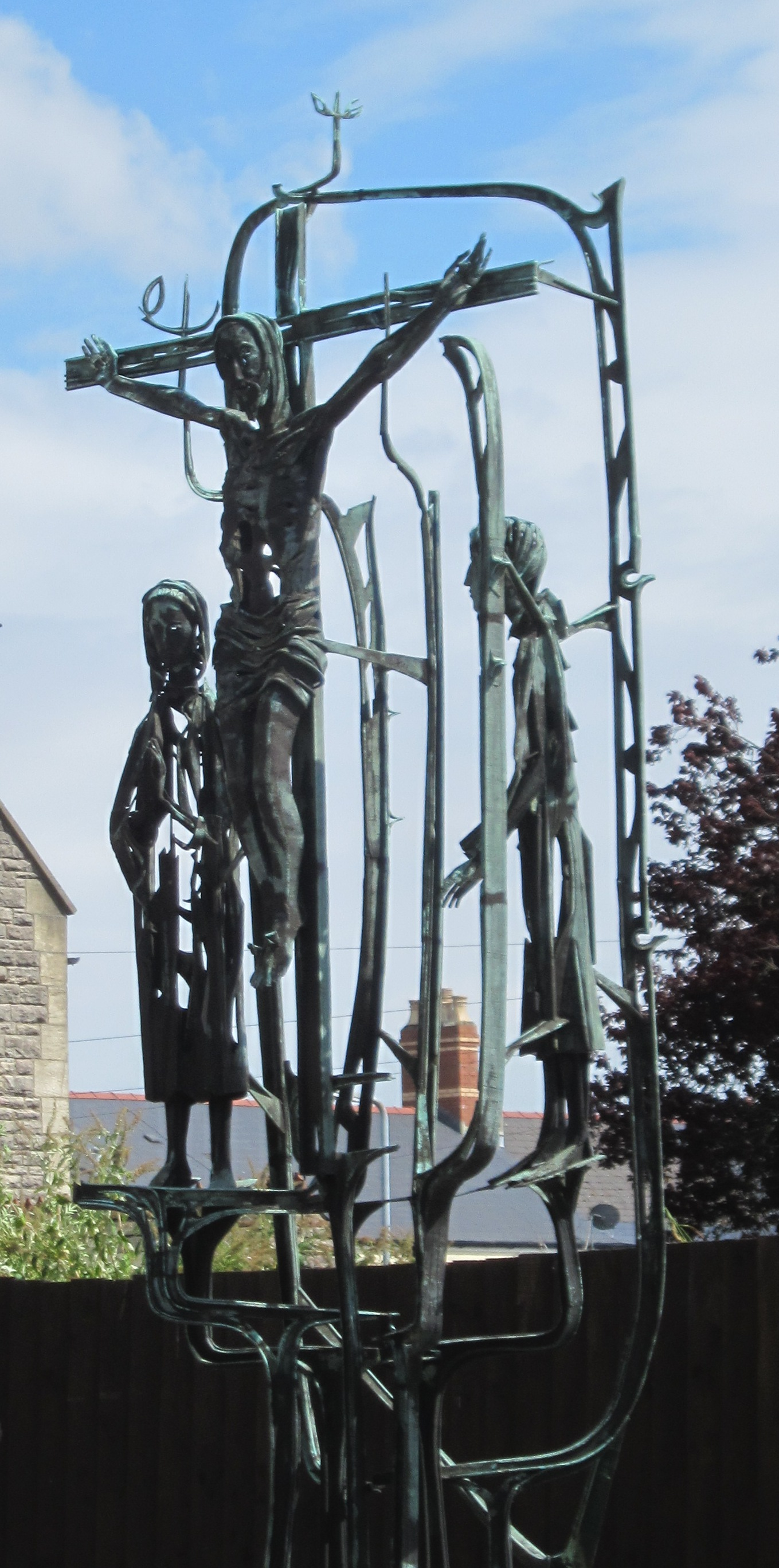
Crucifixion with Mary and John by Frank Roper, outside the west doors of the church

The new church was designed by architect George Frederick Bodley, part of architectural partnership Bodley & Garner. It was built between 1881 and 1884. Newman describes the church as "tall, spacious and elegant" and of "widespread influence locally". Among other features of note, high on the south wall of the chancel of St. German's is a particularly finely carved and painted organ case – recently painstakingly restored to its former glory – which was given to the new church by the Rev. Francis Edward Nugee, who spent most of the 1880s as a young curate in the parish of Roath under the Rev. Charles Smythies, who was vicar of Roath until 1883; Smythies went on to become Bishop of British Central Africa (later renamed Nyasaland, now Malawi) and Nugee later married his half-sister, Edith Alston.

In addition to the church there is a school and clergy house next door, built contemporaneously by the same architects.

St German's church was consecrated in March 1886 and the new parish of St German was created in the same month. The Reverend Canon Jarel Robinson-Brown was licensed as vicar of St Germans on 23rd March 2024.

== In the media ==
The BBC Radio 4 programme The Daily Service has been broadcast from St German's on several occasions.

The 2026 Channel 4 Drama 'Falling' used St German's and some surrounding areas for filming. In particular as St Sebastian's Church, where the character of the Catholic priest David (Paapa Essiedu) is based. The show is written by Jack Thorne, and also stars Keeley Hawes as the devout nun Anna, who develops sudden and life changing feelings for Priest David.
