= Trinity Methodist Church, Cardiff =

Former church in Cardiff, Wales

Trinity Methodist Church
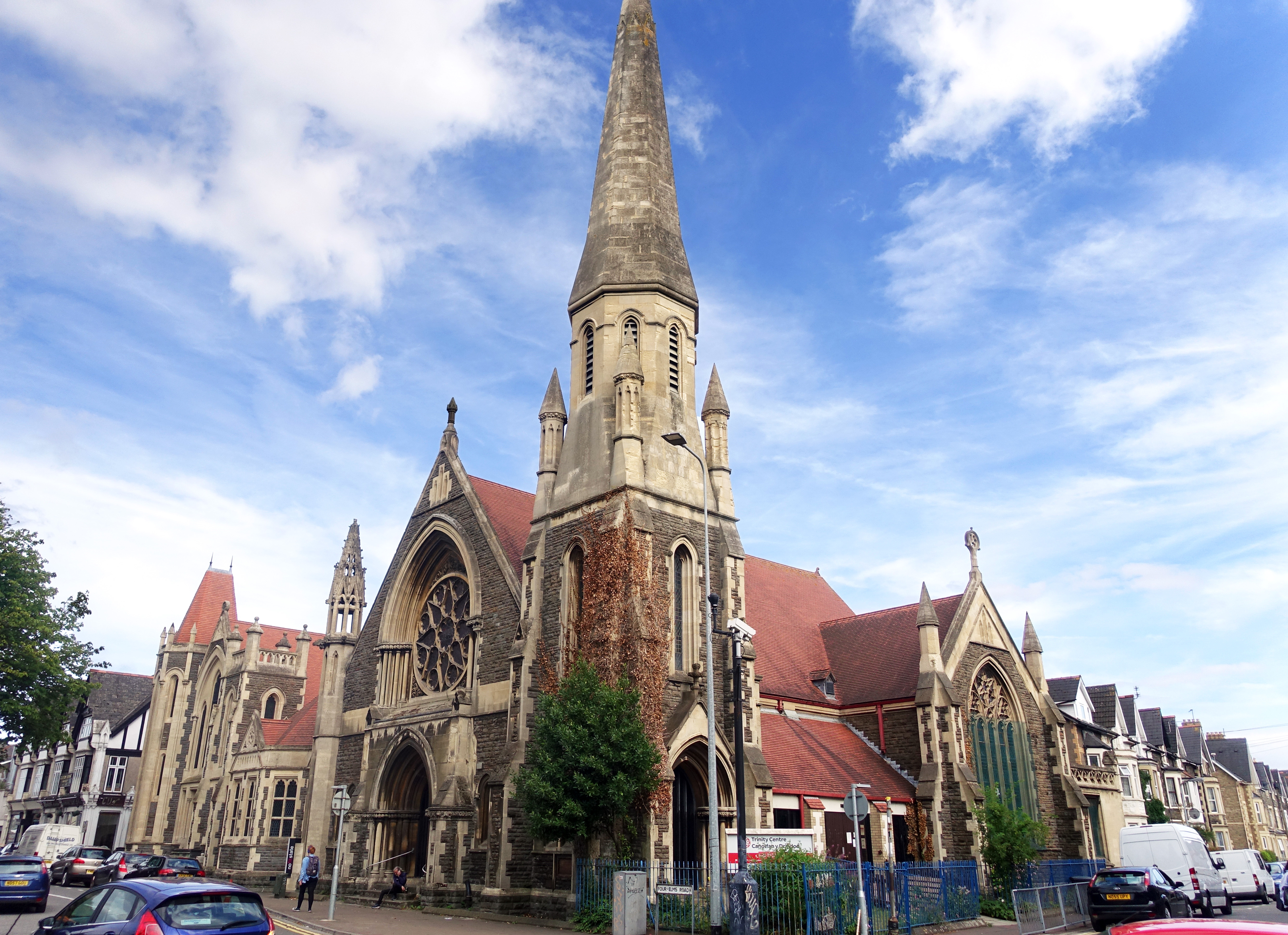
- The centre in 2018
- Trinity Methodist Church
- 51.48648°N 3.16034°W
- Location: Adamsdown, Cardiff
- Denomination: Methodist
- Website: www.trinitycentre.wales

History
- Former name(s): Trinity Methodist Church, Newport Road United Methodist (Free) Church
- Status: Defunct

Architecture
- Functional status: Active
- Heritage designation: Grade II
- Designated: 5 June 1980
- Architect(s): A.V. Ingall & Sons
- Groundbreaking: 29 April 1896
- Completed: 1897

Specifications
- Materials: stone

Trinity Methodist Church, now the Trinity Centre, is a Grade II listed former Methodist church in Adamsdown, Cardiff, Wales.

== History ==
The church was built in 1896–1897 by Albert Victor Ingall & Sons of Birmingham for the United Methodist Free Churches as a replacement for their chapel on Guildford Crescent. The old chapel was sold and became the Masonic Hall. Originally named Newport Road United Methodist Free Church, it was the last built of a number of Methodist presences in the area, the others being Roath Road (opened in 1871, which stood at the junction of Newport Road and City Road, the former being originally named Roath Road until c. 1880) and Broadway (originally founded in 1872 in what is now Nora Street, later moving to Broadway in 1879-80). By the postwar years, this situation had become untenable: the Roath Road church was rendered unusable during the Cardiff Blitz of 1941, and both had seen a decline in attendance. In 1950, the decision was made to merge the Roath Road and Broadway congregations into that of Newport Road, which was renamed Trinity Methodist Church upon the merger. The Roath Road church (already a ruin) was demolished in 1955. The Broadway site was sold to the BBC for £7000 and was used as a studio until c. 1975. It subsequently became a commercial premises before being converted into a mosque in 1980. It was destroyed on 19 September 1989 by a fire which caused substantial damage to several other buildings on Broadway.

An extensive remodelling occurred at Trinity in 1978, during which the building was subdivided horizontally by Wyn Thomas & Partners.

By the early 2010s, the building had become hard to maintain, and worship ceased in the building in 2013.

== Current use ==
The church is now used by the Welsh Refugee Council as a welcoming and assistance centre. The centre formerly received an Equality and Diversity Grant from the Welsh Government but this ended in 2017. The grant only supported part of the work performed by the Centre.

The location is also used for worship by the Mar Thoma Syrian Church. The congregation began as a prayer group of St Thomas Mar Thoma Church in Bristol, with the first meeting held in Cardiff in 2006. The congregation became independent in 2015.

== Oasis Centre ==
A similar facility is located in the Oasis Centre on Splott Road. The Centre (also a former Methodist church) was originally founded in 1886, with a large chapel being added in 1895, and a schoolroom in 1908. The chapel was demolished in 1964, with the schoolroom being adapted as a replacement. It was converted into the Oasis Centre in 2008.
