= Roath =

District and community in Cardiff, Wales

Coordinates: 51°29′28″N 3°09′38″W

Roath: Welsh: Y Rhath
- Community
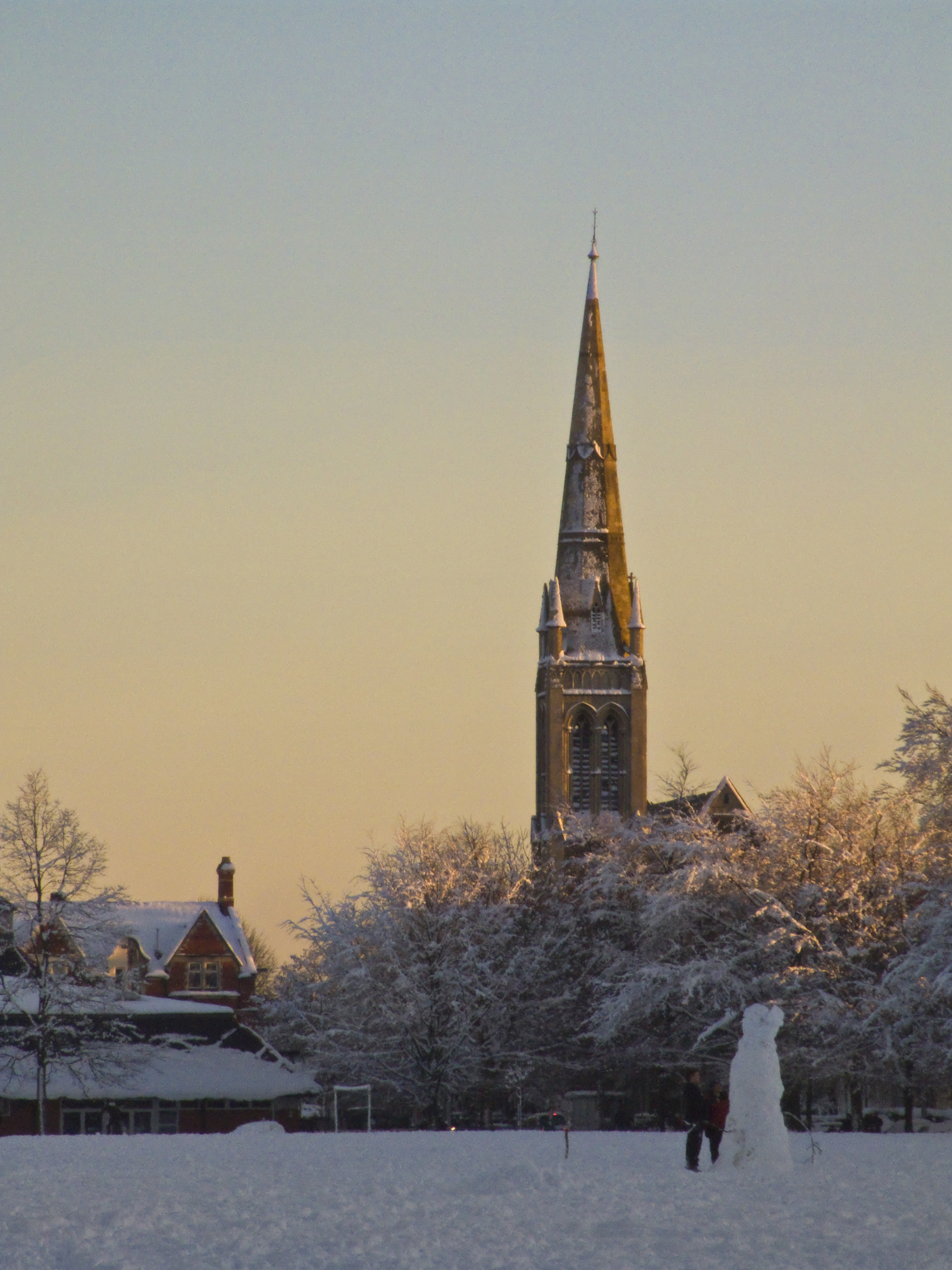
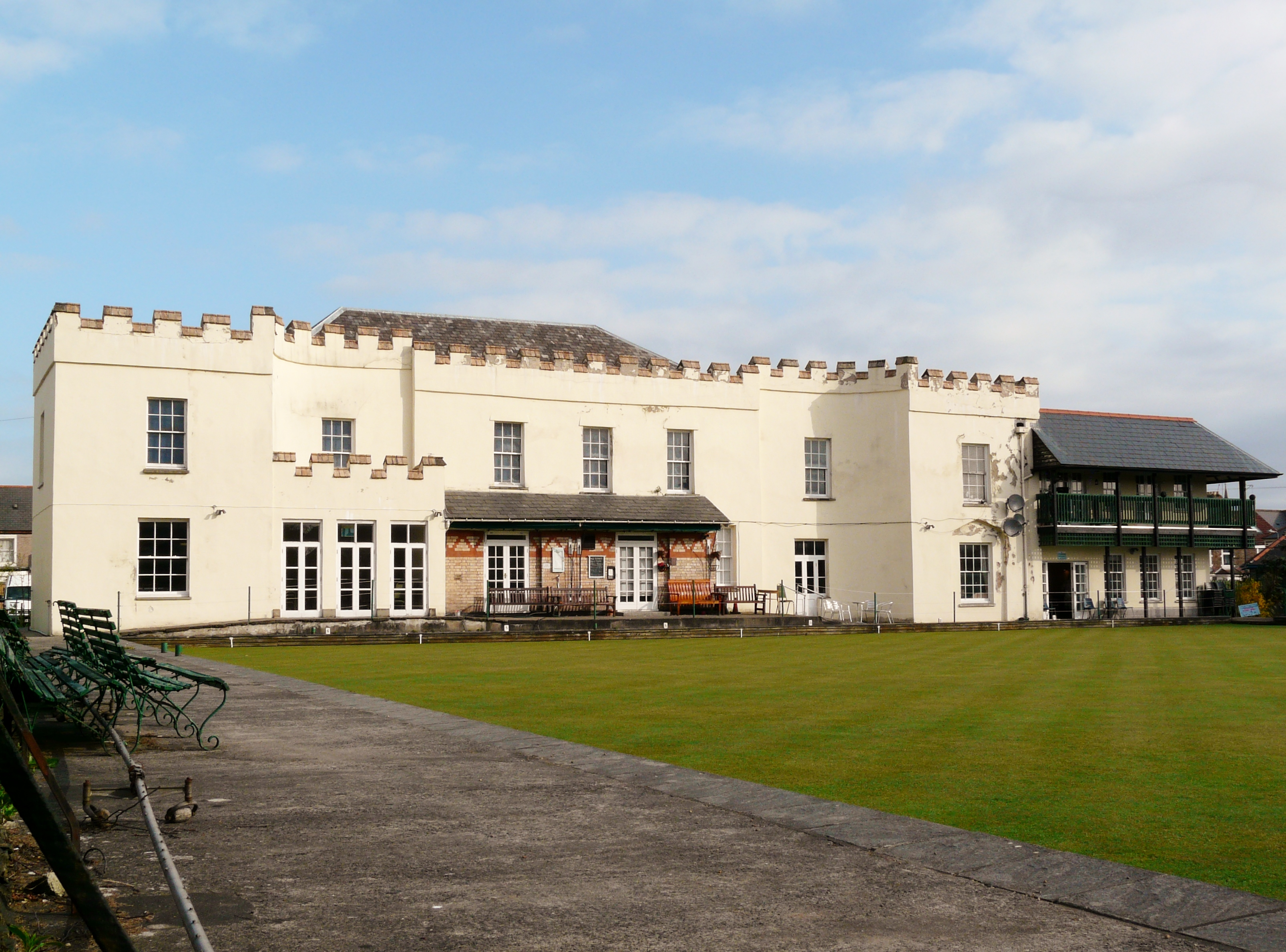
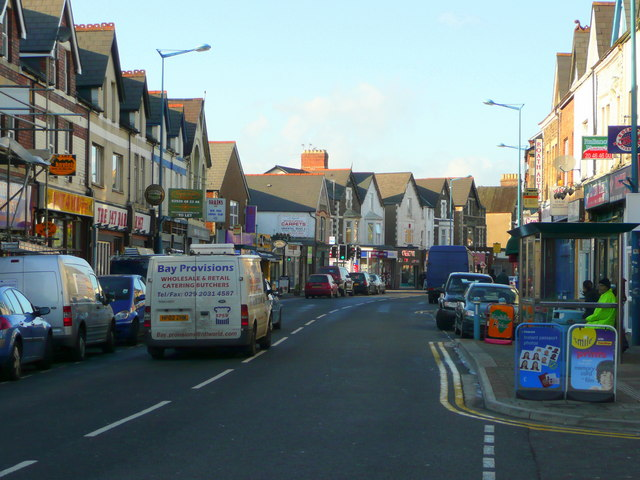
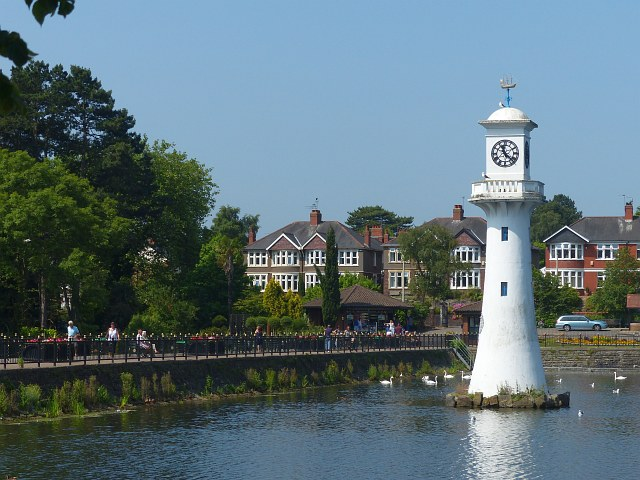
- From left to right: Top: Roath Recreation Ground & St. Andrew's United Reformed Church; Middle: Mackintosh Sports Club, City Road; Bottom: Scott Memorial at Roath Park Lake

- Location within Cardiff
- Principal area: Cardiff
- Country: Wales
- Sovereign state: United Kingdom
- Police: South Wales
- Fire: South Wales
- Ambulance: Welsh
- List of places UK Wales Cardiff Map of the community

Roath (Welsh: Y Rhath) is a district and community to the north-east of the city centre of Cardiff, capital of Wales. The area is mostly covered by the Plasnewydd electoral ward, and stretches from Adamsdown in the south to Roath Park in the north.

== Description ==
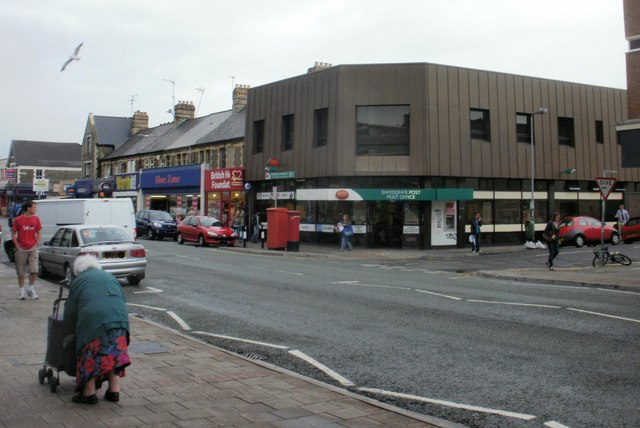
Post Office and shops on Albany Road

Roath's main shopping streets are Albany Road, City Road, and Wellfield Road. The area is characterised by its several tree-lined avenues and Victorian era terraced streets. Roath houses a very diverse population including a large number of students, being very close to the main university campuses, a large ethnic minority population and many young professionals. Subdivision of the large Victorian properties is starting to occur in the areas at the south end of the district.

Its close proximity to the city centre, its number of local amenities, churches, shops and restaurants and public houses and Roath Park make it a popular area to live.

The area has five primary schools, Albany Primary School, Marlborough Primary School, Roath Park Primary School, St Peter's R.C. Primary School and Stacey Primary School. Community facilities include the YMCA Plas community centre and the Mackintosh Sports Club.

== Etymology ==
Samuel Lewis stated that the original name was Rhâth, adding that this was a common element in Welsh toponymy denoting ancient earthworks (cognate with rati, meaning a fortified enclosure in Gaulish and ráth, a ringfort in Old Irish). Lewis further states that several of these earthworks were still visible in his time (likely referring to the earthworks and ditches which had surrounded the old manor house for centuries), suggesting that the area may have been home to an important fortified settlement of the Silures tribe.

Roath has also been identified with Ratostabius, a disputed placename found in Ptolomey's Geographia. Both William Camden and Iolo Morganwg believed this place was in the vicinity of modern Cardiff, with Iolo suggesting that the Latin name was derived from "Rhath Taff".

== History ==
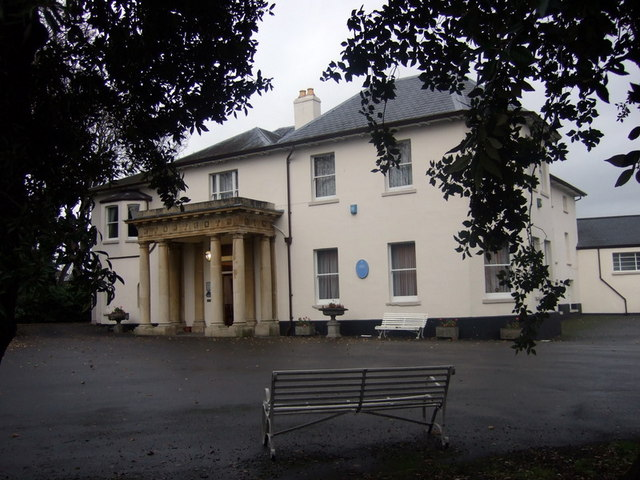
Roath Court

Roath Court is a nineteenth-century villa on the site of the medieval manor house of Roath. Since 1952 it has been a funeral home. Its Georgian portico, designed by Robert Adam in 1766 for Bowood House, Wiltshire, was moved there in 1956.

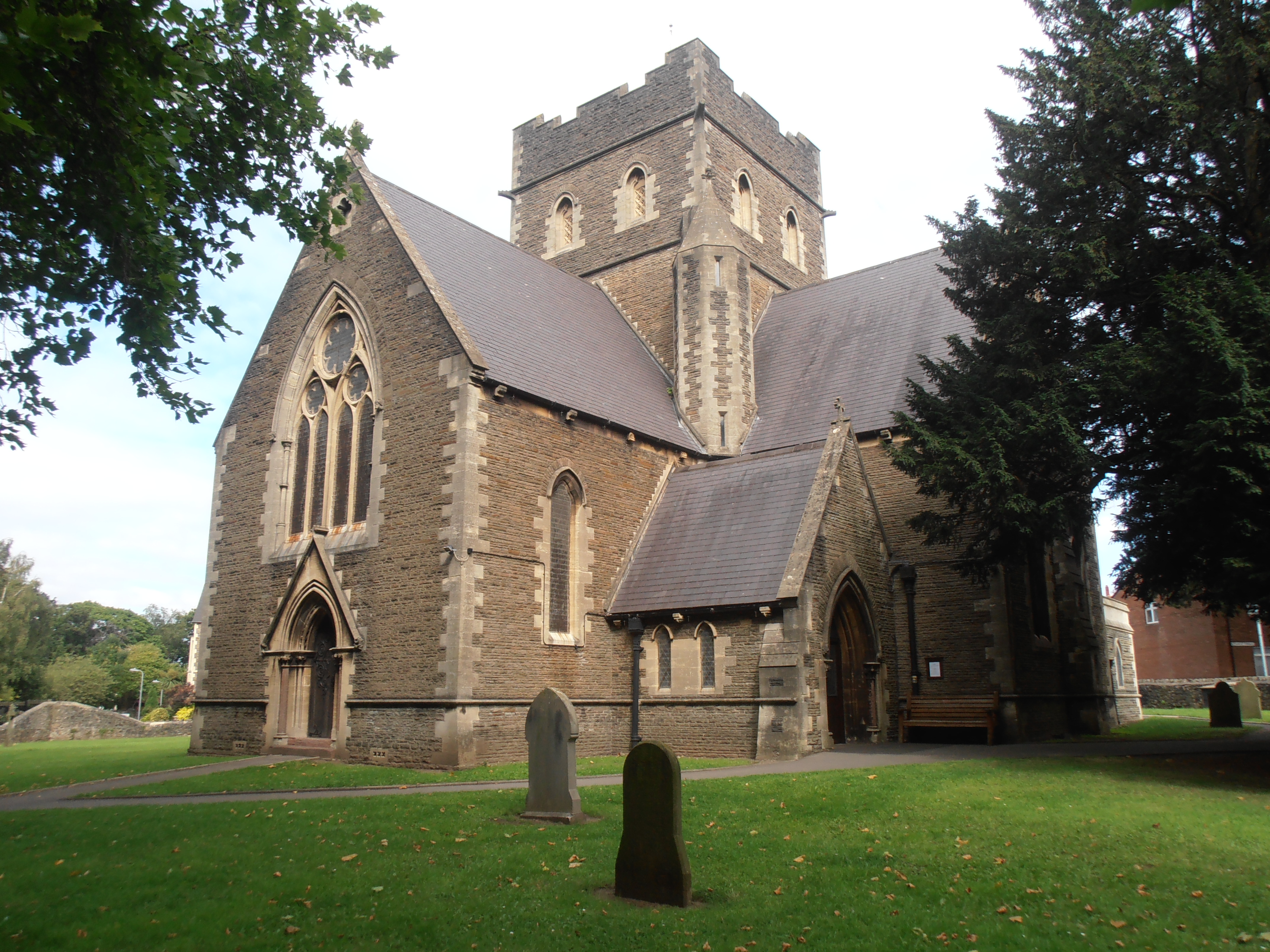
St Margaret's Church, Roath

Roath contains the Church of Saint Margaret of Antioch, built in 1870 in Gothic Revival style on the site of an earlier Norman chapel. Designed by Llandaff architect John Prichard on a Greek Cross plan, it was financed by the third Marquess of Bute, in spite of his conversion to Catholicism in 1868. Inside is an opulent mausoleum housing tombs of nine members of the Bute family, including the first marquess and his two wives. The tower of St Margaret's was finally completed in 1926.

Roath once had a railway station on the South Wales Main Line, but this closed in 1917.

Prior to the 2010s the community was known as Plasnewydd, though was renamed as Roath, being a name that was more widely recognised.

== Notable buildings ==
- Cardiff University, Queen's Buildings (School of Engineering)
- Roath Library
- Mansion House, Richmond Road, used as the mayor's residence for much of the 20th century
- Shah Jalal Mosque, Crwys Road (formerly Capel Crwys)
- St Margaret's Church (and the Bute Mausoleum)
- St. Martin's Church, Albany Road
- St. Edward's Church, Blenheim Road
- St. Peters RFC
- The Gate Arts Centre, Keppoch Street
- Trinity Methodist Church

== Festivals and events ==
Starting in 2009, the Made in Roath arts festival took place each October. The event showcased art, music, performance and literature in a variety of venues including peoples' homes. The tenth festival took place in 2018. Made in Roath now exists as a community arts organisation that arranges exhibitions and residencies.

Between 2013 and 2016, local organisers Wayne Courtney and Nathan Wyburn hosted the 'Roath Bake Off' festival in St Andrews United Reformed Church, Roath. In December 2018, they announced that the event would be revived for 2019 as part of the campaign to raise funds for the church it was held in.

== Art and culture ==
Roath has been described as having a "reputation as one of Cardiff’s most important cultural hubs and gallery districts" with a variety of established art galleries, as well as the 'Made in Roath' arts festival. The Albany Gallery on Albany Road has been running since 1965. In 2023 a new contemporary art gallery, Celf, opened near Wellfield Road.

A regular Roath Gallery Weekend was launched in May 2024, involving Celf Gallery, Albany Gallery, Cardiff M.A.D.E, Makers Gallery, TEN and G39.

== Notable people ==
- William Cope, 1st Baron Cope, politician and international rugby player
- Lionel Fanthorpe
- Peter Finch (poet), writer and poet
- Boyd Clack, writer, actor and playwright
- Brian Hibbard, musician
- Nathan Wyburn, artist and local events organiser alongside Wayne Courtney aka Wyburn & Wayne.
- William Erbery (1604-1654), curate of St Woolos, Newport between 1630 and 1633 then Vicar of St Mary's Church in Cardiff before being forced to leave his post due to his Puritanism. He established the first nonconformist congregation in Cardiff
- Maureen Rees, British reality TV star (b. 1942)
- John Sankey, 1st Viscount Sankey, Labour politician and Lord Chancellor. Grew up in Castle Road (now City Road).

== See also ==
- Tredegarville
