= List of ship launches in 1817 =

The list of ship launches in 1817 includes a chronological list of some ships launched in 1817.

Date	Ship	Class	Builder	Location	Country	Notes
3 January	Linnet	Quail-class schooner		Deptford Dockyard	United Kingdom	For Royal Navy.
3 January	Quail	Quail-class schooner	William Stone	Deptford Dockyard	United Kingdom	For Royal Navy.
January	Milo	Brig	James Crown	Sunderland	United Kingdom	For James Crown.
1 February	Thetis	Leda-class frigate		Pembroke Dockyard	United Kingdom	For Royal Navy.
4 February	Alert	Whaler	John Hutcheon & Co.	Peterhead	United Kingdom	For private owner.
15 February	Swift	Quail-class schooner	Henry Canham	Woolwich Dockyard	United Kingdom	For Royal Navy.
16 February	Espérance	Corvette		Dunkirk	France	For French Navy.
17 February	Melville	Black Prince-class ship of the line		Bombay Dockyard	India	For Royal Navy.
18 February	Redbreast	Quail-class schooner	Henry Canham	Deptford Dockyard	United Kingdom	For Royal Navy.
15 March	Almorah	Full-rigged ship	John Foster	Selby	United Kingdom	For private owner.
19 March	Agincourt	Vengeur-class ship of the line	Edward Churchill	Plymouth Dockyard	United Kingdom	For Royal Navy.
22 March	Defiance	Paddle steamer	John Wood & Co.	Port Glasgow	United Kingdom	For Lochgoil Co.
March	Mary	Schooner	Robert Davy	Topsham	United Kingdom	For private owner.
1 April	Cléopâtre	Armide-class frigate	Jean Michel Segondat	Cherbourg	France	For French Navy.
2 April	Hashemy	Full-rigged ship	Michael Smith	Howrah	India	For private owner.
17 April	Belle Alliance	Merchantman	James Macrae	Chittagong	India	For private owner.
April	Apollo	Brig			United Kingdom	For private owner.
April	Success	Sloop		Garmouth	United Kingdom	For private owner.
3 May	Starling	Cutter	George Parkin	Chatham Dockyard	United Kingdom	For Royal Navy.
11 May	Tug	Paddle tug	John Wood & Co.	Port Glasgow	United Kingdom	For London, Leith, Edinburgh & Glasgow Shipping Co.
17 May	Kamchatka	Kamchatka-class frigate	B. F. Stoke	Saint Petersburg	Russia	For Imperial Russian Navy.
17 May	Tees	Conway-class post ship	William Taylor	Bideford	United Kingdom	For Royal Navy.
30 May	Réal Ferdinand	Steamship		Seville	Spain	For private owner.
15 June	Olimp	Feniks-class sloop	B. F. Stoke	Saint Petersburg	Russia	For Imperial Russian Navy.
26 June	Traveller	Brig	Jabez Bayley	Ipswich	United Kingdom	For private owner.
June	Broughton	Brig	Metcalf	Kingston upon Hull	United Kingdom	For private owner.
June	Perkins	Brig	Steemson	Hull	United Kingdom	For private owner.
15 July	Brampton	East Indiaman	William Bottomley	King's Lynn	United Kingdom	For private owner.
15 July	Kains	Indiaman	James Evans	South Shields	United Kingdom	For private owner.
16 July	Catherine	Indiaman	Richard Bulmer	South Shields	United Kingdom	For private owner.
17 July	Royal George	Royal yacht		Deptford	United Kingdom	For George III.
27 July	Arethusa	Leda-class frigate		Pembroke Dockyard	United Kingdom	For Royal Navy.
30 July	Prince of Cobourg	Steam packet	J. & H. Smith	Gainsborough	United Kingdom	For private owner.
31 July	Emulous	Brig	Chapman & Campion	Whitby	United Kingdom	For Chapman & Co.
July	Polyphème	Téméraire-class ship of the line	Schuyt	Amsterdam	Netherlands	For French Navy.
4 August	Fershampenuaz	Trekh Sviatitlei-class ship of the line	I. S. Razumov	Saint Petersburg	Russia	For Imperial Russian Navy.
12 August	Prince Regent	Royal yacht		Portsmouth Dockyard	United Kingdom	For George III.
13 August	Pomona	Sixth rate	A. M. Kurochkin	Arkhangelsk	Russia	For Imperial Russian Navy.
August	Caroline	Brig			United Kingdom	For private owner.
1 September	Gektor	Provornyi-class frigate	B. F. Stoke	Saint Petersburg	Russia	For Imperial Russian Navy.
17 September	Eol	Vestnik-class cutter	B. F. Stoker	Saint Petersburg	Russia	For Imperial Russian Navy.
29 September	Glasgow	Merchantman	Robert Steel & Co.	Greenock	United Kingdom	For private owner.
7 October	Asia	Brig	Richard Bulmer & Co.	South Shields	United Kingdom	For W. Stoveld.
7 October	Evstafii	Fourth rate	M. K. Surovtsov	Kherson	Russia	For Imperial Russian Navy.
9 October	Andrei	Tender	A. I. Melikhov	Nikolaev	Russia	For Imperial Russian Navy.
11 October	Dionissi	Tender	Tarusov	Sevastopol	Russia	For Imperial Russian Navy.
12 October	Trincomalee	Leda-class frigate	Wadia Group	Calcutta	India	For Royal Navy.
25 October	Dunira	East Indiaman	Robert Wigram	Blackwall Yard	United Kingdom	For British East India Company.
28 October	Lady Patroness	Cutter	Charles Grayson	Liverpool	United Kingdom	For private owner.
October	Salus	Merchantman	John M. & William Gales	Sunderland	United Kingdom	For J. Gales.
14 November	Henry Porcher	Barque	Hilhouse, Sons & Co.	Bristol	United Kingdom	For Joseph Graves.
15 December	Thalia	Full-rigged ship	Gibson	Hull	United Kingdom	For Joel Foster.
Unknown date	Agenor	Brig	John M. & William Gales	Sunderland	United Kingdom	For Richard Clark.
Unknown date	Amphitrite	Snow	John M. & William Gales	Sunderland	United Kingdom	For John M. & William Gales.
Unknown date	Aries	Merchantman	John & Philip Lain	Sunderland	United Kingdom	For H. Tanner.
Unknown date	Borneo	Full-rigged ship	Richard Hare	Borneo	Netherlands East Indies	For Richard Hare.
Unknown date	Busy	Merchantman	John & Philip Laing	Sunderland	United Kingdom	For Mr. Everard.
Unknown date	Calcutta	Merchantman		Chester	United Kingdom	For private owner.
Unknown date	Columbus	Brigantine			United States	For private owner.
Unknown date	Danmark	Third rate			Denmark	For Royal Danish Navy.
Unknown date	Darius	Brig	John M. & William Gales	Sunderland	United Kingdom	For Thomas Bonner.
Unknown date	Diana	Paddle steamer	Elias Evans	Frindsbury	United Kingdom	For Elias Evans.
Unknown date	Doris	Merchantman	John & Philip Laing	Sunderland	United Kingdom	For John Laing.
Unknown date	Dotterel	Brig		Coringa	India	For private owner.
Unknown date	Duke of York	Barque		Bideford	United Kingdom	For J. Price.
Unknown date	Factor	Brig	John M. & William Gales	Sunderland	United Kingdom	For John M. & William Gales.
Unknown date	Favorite	Paddle steamer	Elias Evans	Frindsbury	United Kingdom	For Elias Evans.
Unknown date	Fredriksværn	Brig			Norway	For Royal Norwegian Navy.
Unknown date	Henry Meriton	Brig		Bombay	India	For Bombay Pilot Service.
Unknown date	Hindostan	Merchantman		Liverpool	United Kingdom	For private owner.
Unknown date	Holland	Second rate		Dunkirk	France	For Royal Netherlands Navy.
Unknown date	Kozak	Full-rigged ship		Dunkirk	France	For Royal Netherlands Navy.
Unknown date	King Charles III	Ship of the line		Karlskrona	Sweden	For Royal Swedish Navy.
Unknown date	Lady Raffles	East Indiaman		London	United Kingdom	For British East India Company.
Unknown date	Leopold	Brig			United Kingdom	For private owner.
Unknown date	London	Paddle steamer	Elias Evans	Frindsbury	United Kingdom	For Elias Evans.
Unknown date	Lyra	Brig	John M. & William Gales	Sunderland	United Kingdom	For William Guest.
Unknown date	Onslow	Merchantman		Onslow	(United Kingdom of Great Britain and Ireland) Upper Canada	For private owner.
Unknown date	Ontario	Paddle steamer	D. Boyd, J. DeGraff, E. Lusher, C. Smyth and A. Van Santvoord	Sacketts Harbor, New York	United States	For Ontario Steamboat Company.
Unknown date	Orient	Merchantman		Sunderland	United Kingdom	For private owner.
Unknown date	Prince Regent	Merchantman		King's County	(United Kingdom of Great Britain and Ireland) Upper Canada	For private owner.
Unknown date	Proteus	Merchantman	John Laing & Co	Sunderland	United Kingdom	For Laing & Co.
Unknown date	Schelde	Pallas-class frigate		Rotterdam	Netherlands	For Royal Netherlands Navy.
Unknown date	Scotia	Brig	John M. & William Gales	Sunderland	United Kingdom	For W. Marshall.
Unknown date	Severn	Snow		Chepstow	United Kingdom	For private owner.
Unknown date	Shannon	Merchantman	John Laing & Co.	Sunderland	United Kingdom	For Kendall & Co.
Unknown date	Sons of Commerce	Paddle steamer	Elias Evans	Frindsbury	United Kingdom	For Elias Evans.
Unknown date	Thalia	Merchantman	John & Philip Laing	Sunderland	United Kingdom	For J. Felt.
Unknown date	Thomas & Ann	Snow		Sunderland	United Kingdom	For private owner.
Unknown date	Thomas & Nancy	Merchantman	John Brockbank	Lancaster	United Kingdom	For private owner.
Unknown date	Transit	Full-rigged ship		Whitby	United Kingdom	For Francis Fisher.
Unknown date	Vulkan	Vulkan-class bomb vessel	A. P. Antipev	Kazan	Russia	For Imperial Russian Navy.
Unknown date	Westmoreland	Full-rigged ship		Hull	United Kingdom	For private owner.
Unknown date	Woods	Brigantine	John Wood & Co.	Port Glasgow	United Kingdom	For Bain & Co.
Unknown date	Zefir	Cutter	B. F. Stoke	Saint Petersburg	Russia	For Imperial Russian Navy.
Unknown date	Zwaluw	Full-rigged ship		Rotterdam	Netherlands	For Royal Netherlands Navy.
