= French privateer Adolphe =

The British Royal Navy captured at least four French privateers named Adolphe during the period of the French Revolutionary and Napoleonic Wars:

French Revolutionary Wars

- 1797: In May 1797 HMS Seagull, Nautilus, and the hired armed cutter King George captured the French privateer lugger Adolphe. King George led the chase with Nautilus and Seagull joining in before Nautilus succeeded in capturing Adolphe. Adolphe was pierced for 12 guns but had thrown some overboard during the chase. When the British captured her, Adolphe had five carriage guns, eight swivels, and a crew of 35. She was new, nine days out of Boulogne on her first cruise and had not taken any prizes.
- 1798: HMS Corso captured Adolphe, of six guns and 42 men, around 20 November 1798 near Tangier Bay.

Napoleonic Wars

- 1807: On 26 January 1807, the armed defense ship Norfolk captured the French privateer lugger Adolphe.
- 1807: On 4 December 1807 HMS Leda captured the privateer lugger Adolphe.

There were other privateers by that name as well:

- In 1799–1800, during the Quasi-War, Adolphe, César Cronstag, master, captured four American vessels.
- Lloyd's List reported on 14 June 1811 that French privateer Adolphe had captured George and Mary, but that HMS Tonnant had recaptured George and Mary, which had been sailing from the West Indies and which arrived in Plymouth on 11 June.
