= HMS Lively (1813) =

Royal Navy fifth-rate frigate

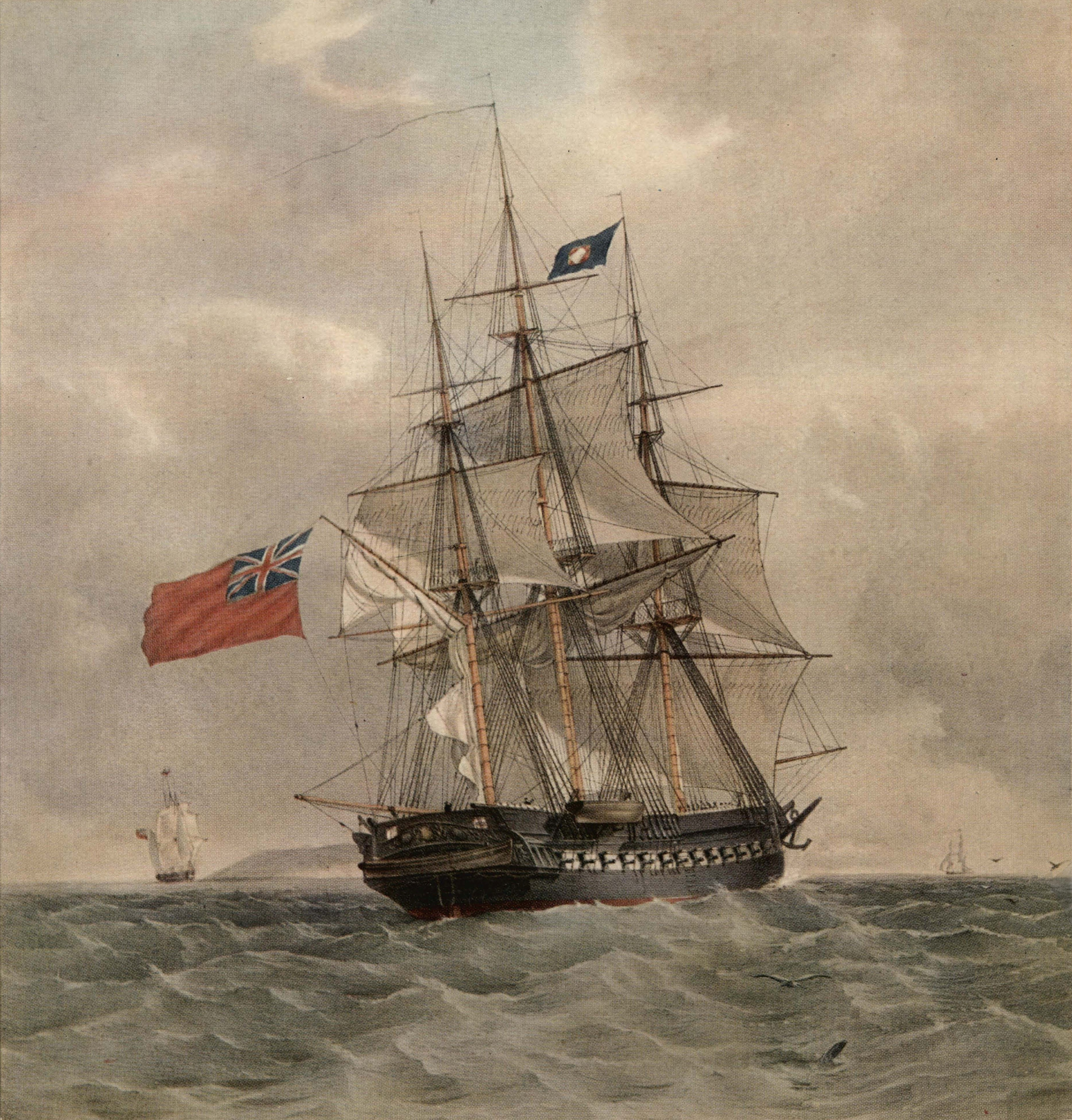
- Sister ship of Lively, HMS Pomone

History

United Kingdom
- Name: Lively
- Ordered: 28 September 1808
- Builder: Robert Seppings & George Parkin Chatham Dockyard
- Cost: £25,248
- Laid down: July 1810
- Launched: 14 July 1813
- Commissioned: November 1823
- Decommissioned: 4 December 1826
- Fate: Sold for breaking 28 April 1863

General characteristics
- Class & type: Fifth-rate Leda-class frigate
- Tons burthen: 1,08022/94 (bm)
- Length: 150 ft 1 in (45.7 m) (upper deck); 125 ft 1 2/4 in (38.1 m) (keel)
- Beam: 40 ft 3 1/2 in (12.3 m)
- Draught: 11 ft 1 in (3.4 m) (forward); 14 ft 6 in (4.4 m) (aft)
- Depth of hold: 12 ft 10 in (3.9 m)
- Propulsion: Sails
- Complement: 300
- Armament: UD: 28 × 18-pounder guns; QD: 14 × 32-pounder carronades; Fc: 2 × 9-pounder guns + 2 × 32-pounder carronades

HMS Lively was a 46-gun Leda-class frigate of the Royal Navy. Launched in 1813 during the Napoleonic Wars, the ship was initially placed in ordinary. An aborted attempt to sell her was made before Lively was readied for active service in 1823. Serving on the Lisbon Station the frigate was present during the April Revolt in 1824, providing shelter to the fleeing Count of Subserra and, after the failure of the revolt, escorting Dom Miguel of Portugal into exile in France.

Lively continued at Lisbon into 1825, before escorting a convoy to New York and then travelling to serve off the coast of South America. When the Spanish garrison at Veracruz was defeated in November during the Spanish attempts to reconquer Mexico, Lively brought the news back to Britain. She then conveyed Sir Neil Campbell to Sierra Leone in August 1826, being present in the aftermath of the Katamanso War at Cape Coast Castle in September. The frigate was paid off at the end of the year and saw no further active service. Converted into a receiving ship in 1831, she served at Plymouth Dockyard until 1860 and was sold to be broken up three years later.

== Design and construction ==
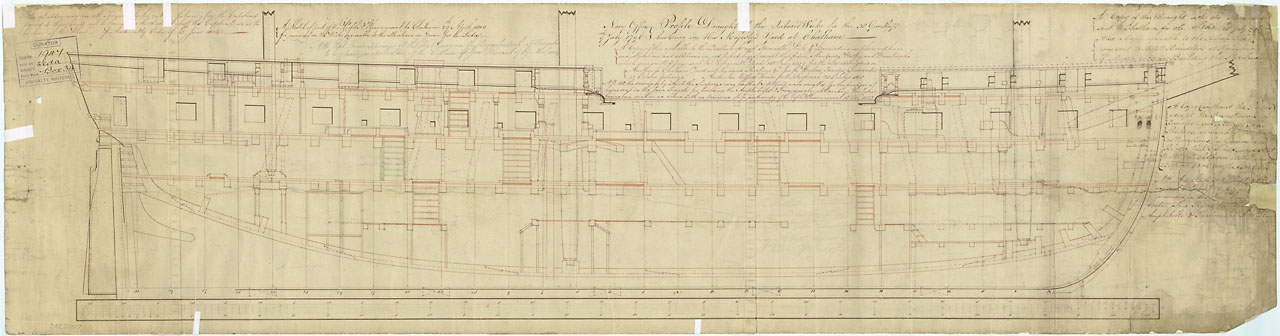
Design plan of Lively

Lively was an 18-pounder fifth-rate Leda-class frigate. (Note: Ships of the Royal Navy were categorised in a rating system. Fifth-rate ships were those holding between thirty and forty-four guns, and usually frigates. They were smaller than fourth-rates, of fifty and sixty guns, but larger than sixth-rates, of twenty to thirty guns.) Frigates were three-masted, full-rigged ships that carried their main battery on a single, continuous gun deck. They were smaller and faster than ships of the line and primarily intended for raiding, reconnaissance and messaging. The class was based on the lines of the captured French 38-gun frigate Hébé, a design by Jacques-Noël Sané vaunted as an all-rounder. The naval historian Robert Gardiner argues that the key characteristic of the design, leading to its adoption by the Royal Navy, was its "unspectacular excellence". One ship, HMS Leda, was built during the French Revolutionary Wars in 1800. With the Napoleonic Wars subsequently beginning in 1803, the design was revived to be one of three standard types of frigate mass-produced during the conflict. This differed to the strategy of the previous war which had seen a much more sporadic choice of designs.

Eight ships of the Leda class were ordered between 1803 and 1809, the first three with private contractors and the later ships to royal dockyards. Lively was one of the latter group, ordered on 28 September 1808 to be built at Chatham Dockyard by Robert Seppings. The ship was laid down in July 1810 and, with construction underway, the shipwright George Parkin replaced Seppings in March 1813. The ship was launched on 14 July with the following dimensions: 150 feet 1 inch (45.7 m) along the gun deck, 125 feet 1 1/4 inches (38.1 m) at the keel, with a beam of 40 feet 3 1/2 inches (12.3 m) and a depth in the hold of 12 feet 10 inches (3.9 m). Her draught was 11 feet 1 inch (3.4 m) forward and 14 feet 6 inches (4.4 m) aft, and the ship was calculated at 1,080 22/94 tons burthen. Lively was not fitted out for active service and was instead completed on 15 July to go in ordinary at a total cost of £25,248. This meant she was moored in harbour with her guns, stores, and upper masts removed, manned by a small group of warrant officers.

The frigate was to have a complement of 284, later increased to 300. Lively held twenty-eight 18-pounder long guns on her upper deck. Complementing this were eight 9-pounder long guns and six 32-pounder carronades on the quarterdeck, and two 9-pounder long guns and two 32-pounder carronades on the forecastle. Originally classed as 38-gun frigates, in 1817 the ships were re-classed as 46-gun frigates. Sailing reports from ships of the Leda class record that they were generally very fast, reaching 13 knots (24 km/h) in strong winds. They were not particularly weatherly and rolled heavily.

Originally ordered as Scamander, the frigate was renamed Lively on 7 December 1812 while under construction. She was the fourteenth Royal Navy vessel to hold the name, replacing the previous HMS Lively which had been wrecked in 1810.

== Service ==
Upon her completion plans had initially been made to commission Lively; in May Captain Frederick Aylmer had taken the frigate under control in preparation for this, but the orders were cancelled. Lively remained in ordinary for the duration of the Napoleonic Wars, after which she was put up for sale. This was agreed with John Small Sedger of Rotherhithe on 22 July 1819; again the order for Lively was cancelled, and she instead remained in ordinary.

Lively received a small repair at Chatham between July and September 1821, costing £8,026. Work was then undertaken for the frigate to finally enter active service. Fitting out began in December 1823 and was completed on 27 January 1824, with a further cost of £13,815. While this was underway Lively was commissioned by Captain William Elliot in November 1823 for service on the Lisbon Station.

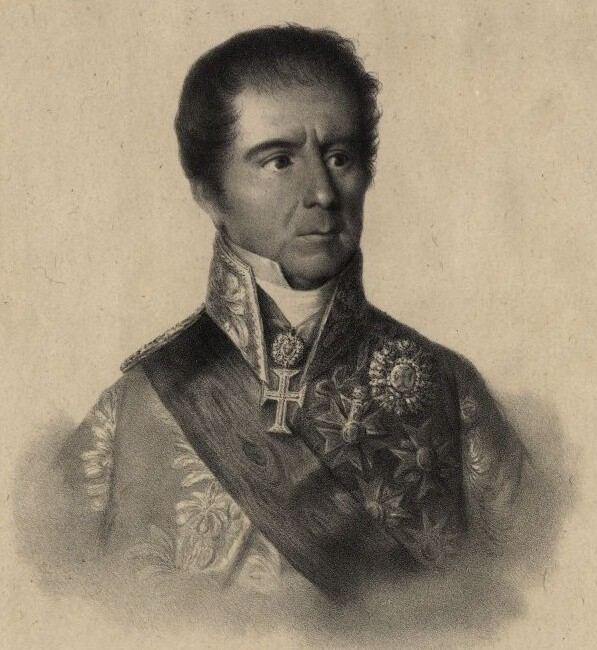
The Count of Subserra took refuge on Lively during the April Revolt

While Lively was on station turmoil grew in Portugal, and on 30 April 1824 Dom Miguel of Portugal began the April Revolt in an attempt to oust his father, John VI of Portugal. With troops under his command Miguel started arresting his enemies, one of whom was Manuel Inácio Martins Pamplona Corte Real, 1st Count of Subserra. Looking to assist Subserra in escaping Miguel, the French and British ambassadors, Jean-Guillaume, baron Hyde de Neuville and Sir Edward Thornton, organised for him to go on board Lively. Smuggled aboard from the French embassy on 1 May, Subserra stayed on Lively as she cruised the Tagus. When Miguel learned of this he rode to the Fort of São Julião da Barra and had the fort fire sixteen times at what he believed was Lively off Lisbon. This was actually a British packet boat, and the cannon all missed.

Fearing that John was also at risk of arrest by Miguel, de Neuville tried to organise for the French 80-gun ship of the line Santi Pietri to take him from Lisbon. Santi Pietri never arrived from Cádiz and Thornton instead convinced John to board the 98-gun ship of the line HMS Windsor Castle, which was already present with Lively. This was done on 9 May; from Windsor Castle John wrote to Miguel, stripping him of his command of the army and demanding that he come on board. Not being able to read or write well and misunderstanding the letter, Miguel did so and was arrested.

Miguel was exiled from the country, going to Brest, France. The Portuguese frigate Pérola conveyed him there on 14 May, escorted by Lively and the French corvette Tibre. Lively then returned to the Tagus, where John and his court visited the ship and participated in a grand fête on board. As part of the celebrations for his victory in the revolt, John appointed Elliot a Knight Commander of the Order of the Tower and Sword and his officers, including Royal Marine Major Thomas Adair, knights in the same order. Alongside awards to the officers, John also provided $500 to be distributed between the crews of Windsor Castle and Lively.

Having continued to serve in the Tagus into 1825, she sailed to New York as escort to several merchant ships, arriving on 9 June. She then sailed on to Havana on 2 July. Lively afterwards served off the coast of North America, where Spanish attempts to reconquer Mexico were underway at San Juan de Ulúa Castle in Veracruz. Mexican forces captured the castle from the Spanish in November, and Lively returned to Britain with despatches announcing the loss. She arrived at Plymouth on 2 January 1826.

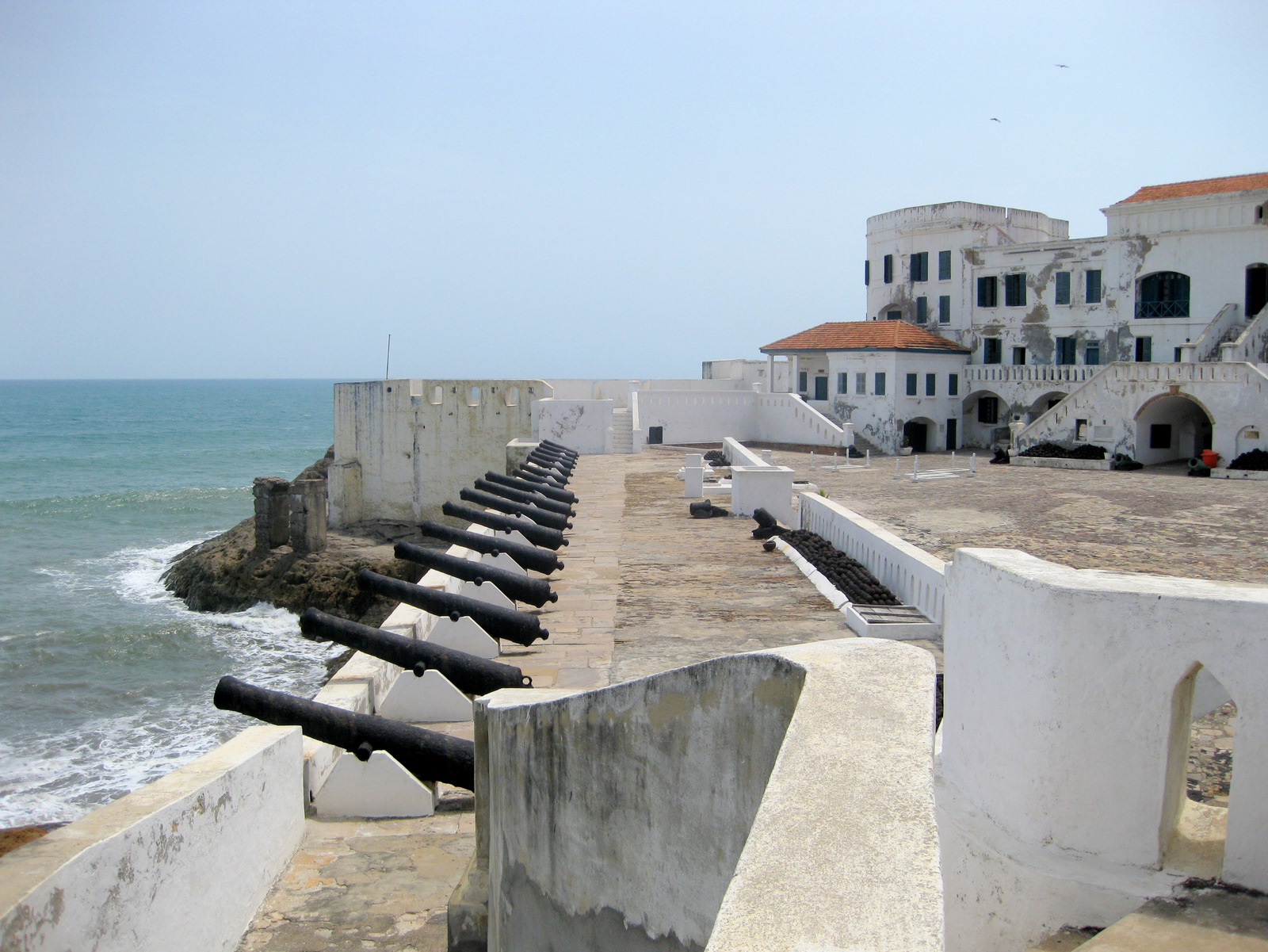
Lively sailed from Cape Coast Castle with news of the Katamanso War in 1826

Lively was next tasked with conveying Major-General Sir Neil Campbell to his new post as Governor of Sierra Leone. Departing from Spithead on 20 July, Campbell arrived at Sierra Leone on 26 August and then had Lively take him to Cape Coast Castle. Reaching there on 22 September, Campbell learned that the Ashanti Empire had attacked Cape Coast and been defeated in the Katamanso War on 7 August. Lively took up the despatches recounting the conflict and left the same day, returning to Portsmouth on 11 November.

Lively was paid off at Plymouth Dockyard on 4 December. She remained out of service until April 1831 when the frigate was converted to serve as a receiving ship, still at Plymouth. Lively continued in the role until 1860; on 28 April 1863 she was sold for £1,215 to be broken up by J & E Marshall of Plymouth.
