= HMS Diamond (1816) =

Royal Navy fifth-rate frigate

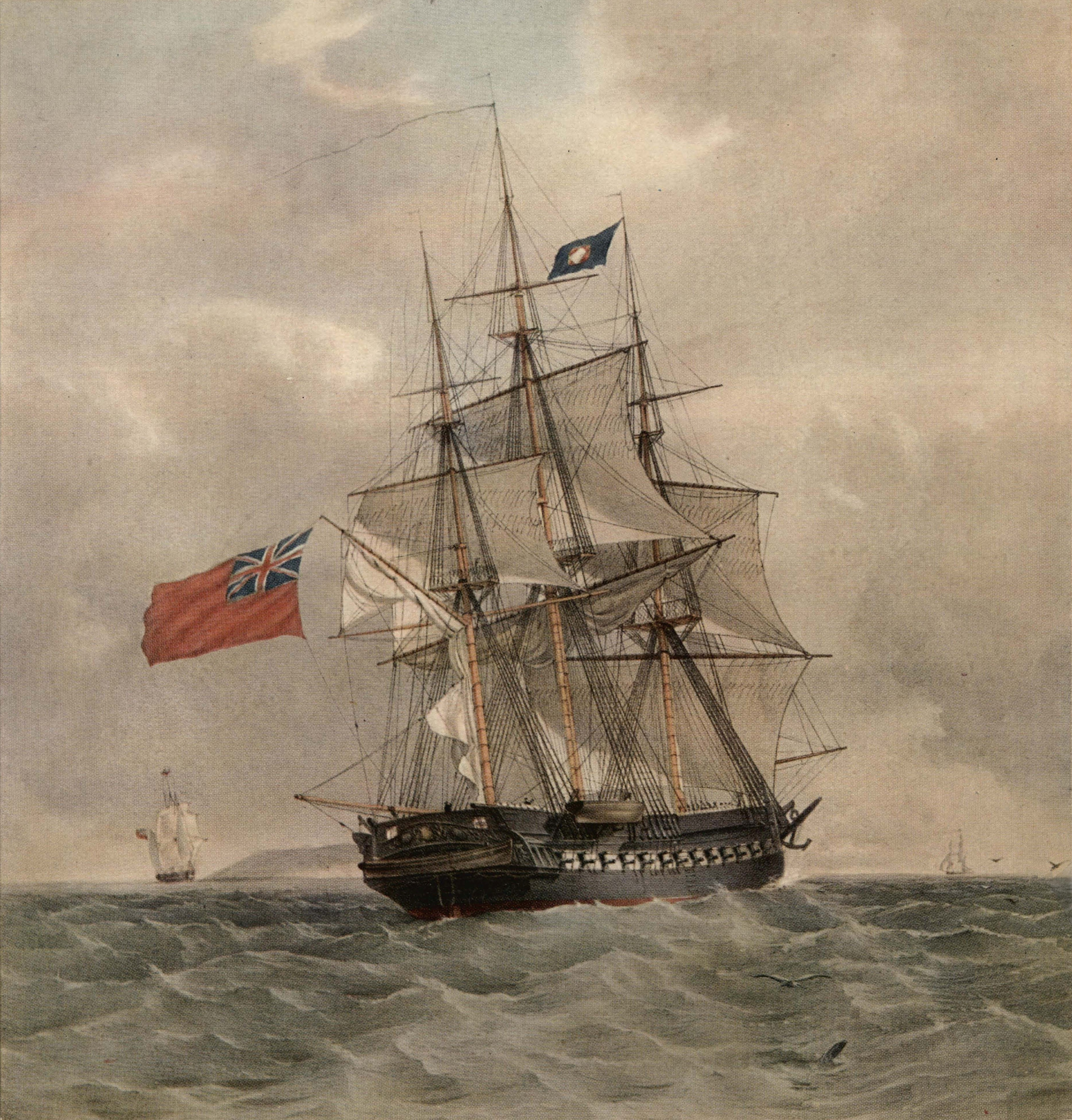
- Sister ship of Diamond, HMS Pomone

History

United Kingdom
- Name: Diamond
- Ordered: 30 June 1812
- Builder: George Parkin, Chatham Dockyard
- Laid down: August 1813
- Launched: 16 January 1816
- Commissioned: May 1824
- Fate: Broken up June 1827

General characteristics
- Class & type: Fifth-rate Leda-class frigate
- Tons burthen: 1,07618/94 (bm)
- Length: 150 ft 0 1/2 in (45.7 m) (upper deck); 125 ft 1 3/4 in (38.1 m) (keel)
- Beam: 40 ft 2 1/2 in (12.3 m)
- Draught: 11 ft 2 in (3.4 m) (forward); 15 ft (4.6 m) (aft)
- Depth of hold: 12 ft 9 in (3.9 m)
- Propulsion: Sails
- Complement: 315
- Armament: UD: 28 × 18-pounder guns; QD: 14 × 32-pounder carronades; Fc: 2 × 9-pounder guns + 2 × 32-pounder carronades

HMS Diamond was a 46-gun Leda-class frigate of the Royal Navy. Launched in 1816 after the end of the Napoleonic Wars, she was initially placed in ordinary before being fitted for service in 1824. Sent to serve on the South America Station, she conveyed the diplomat James Justinian Morier to Mexico on her way out. Diamond subsequently served in South America conveying the diplomat Sir Charles Stuart. While returning to Britain with Stuart in 1826, the ship recovered and repaired the wreck of the merchant ship Frances Mary. Out of service, on 18 February 1827 Diamond was destroyed in an accidental fire at Portsmouth and then broken up.

== Design and construction ==
Diamond was an 18-pounder fifth-rate Leda-class frigate. (Note: Ships of the Royal Navy were categorised in a rating system. Fifth-rate ships were those holding between thirty and forty-four guns, and usually frigates. They were smaller than fourth-rates, of fifty and sixty guns, but larger than sixth-rates, of twenty to thirty guns.) Frigates were three-masted, full-rigged ships that carried their main battery on a single, continuous gun deck. They were smaller and faster than ships of the line and primarily intended for raiding, reconnaissance and messaging. The class was based on the lines of the captured French 38-gun frigate Hébé, a design by Jacques-Noël Sané vaunted as an all-rounder. The naval historian Robert Gardiner argues that the key characteristic of the design, leading to its adoption with the Royal Navy, was its "unspectacular excellence". One ship, HMS Leda, was built during the French Revolutionary Wars in 1800. With the Napoleonic Wars subsequently beginning in 1803, the design was revived to be one of three standard types of frigate mass-produced during the conflict. This contrasted with the strategy of the previous war which had seen a much more sporadic choice of designs.

Diamond was one of seven ships of the class ordered as a group between 1812 and 1815; none were completed before the war ended in the latter year. The frigate was ordered on 30 June 1812 to be built at Chatham Dockyard by George Parkin. Diamond was laid down in August the following year. The ship was launched on 16 January 1816 with the following dimensions: 150 feet 0 1/2 inch (45.7 m) along the gun deck, 125 feet 1 3/4 inches (38.1 m) at the keel, with a beam of 40 feet 2 1/2 inches (12.3 m) and a depth in the hold of 12 feet 9 inches (3.9 m). Her draught was 11 feet 2 inches (3.4 m) forward and 15 feet (4.6 m) aft, and the ship was calculated at 1,076 18/94 tons burthen. Diamond was not fitted out upon completion and was instead placed in ordinary at Chatham. This meant she was moored in the harbour with her guns, stores, and upper masts removed, manned by a small group of warrant officers. The cost of her construction is not recorded.

The frigate had a complement of 315. Diamond held twenty-eight 18-pounder long guns on her upper deck. Complementing these were eight 9-pounder long guns and six 32-pounder carronades on the quarterdeck, and two 9-pounder long guns and two 32-pounder carronades on the forecastle. Originally classed as 38-gun frigates, in 1817 the ships were re-classed as 46-gun frigates. Sailing reports from ships of the Leda class record that they were generally very fast, reaching 13 knots (24 km/h) in strong winds. They were however not particularly weatherly and rolled heavily. Diamond was named after the merchant ship Diamond which had formed part of the English response to the Spanish Armada. She was the seventh Royal Navy ship to bear the name.

== Service ==
Having spent eight years in ordinary at Chatham, Diamond was fitted for her first sea service between February and 24 July 1824. Commissioned in May that year by Captain Lord Napier, she was sent to serve on the South America Station. Conveying the diplomat James Justinian Morier to Mexico for the negotiation of a treaty, the frigate reached St Kitts on 27 September and then sailed for Veracruz.

Diamond was ordered to return to Britain with the diplomat Lionel Harvey who Morier had replaced. Napier, who had spent time ashore with Morier, travelled to Veracruz from Mexico City on 22 December, arriving on 1 January 1825. There Diamond took on board $160,000 and 230 bales of indigo dye and departed on 8 January. Returning via Tampico, Havana, and Bermuda, Diamond arrived at Portsmouth on 22 March. There she was refitted to continue her service on the South America Station.

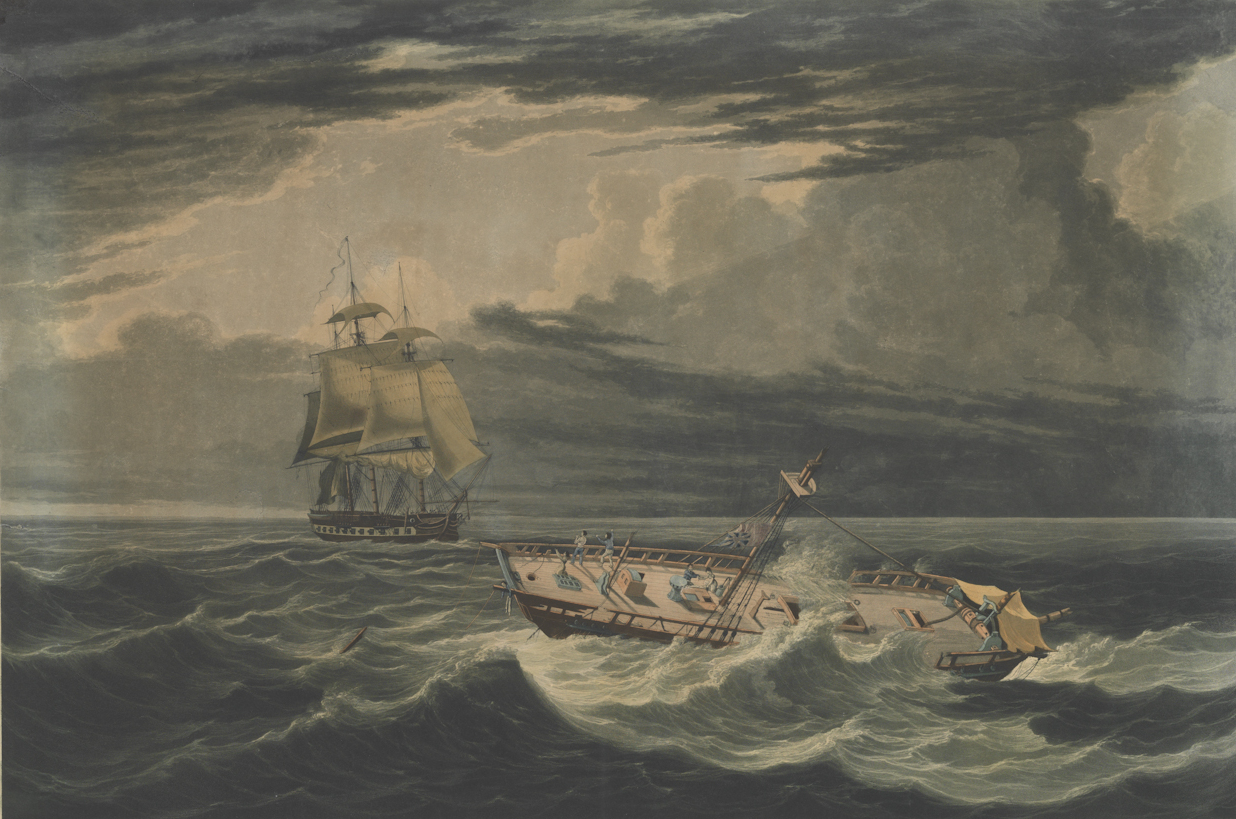
The wreck of Frances Mary is approached by HMS Blonde on 7 March 1826

Having returned to South America, in November Diamond was assigned to convey the diplomat Sir Charles Stuart on an inspection of South American ports. The ship visited Pernambuco, Bahia, and Santos, before sailing to Rio de Janeiro in expectation of meeting Pedro I of Brazil. Finding that Pedro had gone to Bahia with a squadron of ships, Diamond travelled there and joined the squadron alongside a French frigate. Pedro and his wife Maria Leopoldina of Austria visited the ship. An officer on board Diamond wrote negatively of the trip to Bahia, noting the only positive to be when Pedro accidentally gifted the ship seven bullocks that had been meant for the French. Diamond left Pedro's ships at Bahia and sailed on to Espírito Santo before going to Rio de Janeiro for a refit. There the ship was ordered to continue with Stuart, this time conveying him to Lisbon.

While on passage on 7 June 1826 the frigate came across the wreck of the merchant ship Frances Mary. This vessel had been sailing from New Brunswick to Liverpool when she was de-masted in a storm and had her rudder destroyed on 4 February, leaving her unable to manoeuvre. The survivors of Frances Mary were rescued by the 46-gun frigate HMS Blonde on 7 March, with the vessel itself left to drift until discovered by Diamond.

Diamond found Frances Mary in good condition, still buoyant and with her full cargo of timber. Napier decided to take the ship in tow, spending five days repairing her. He then sent a volunteer crew on board and had Frances Mary sailed to Santa Maria Island, not able to take her with him because of the urgency with which Stuart required to reach Lisbon. Diamond arrived there on 9 August, and then returned with Stuart to Santa Maria. Napier had Frances Mary refitted and repaired, taking the ship to São Miguel Island, followed by Faial Island and then Terceira Island. Diamond escorted Frances Mary from Terceira on 31 August, subsequently arriving at Milford Haven on 25 September where the merchant ship was put up for sale.

From Milford Haven Diamond travelled on to Portsmouth, finally landing Stuart on 3 October so that he could make his reports to the Foreign Secretary, George Canning. Diamond's period of active service was planned to continue until May 1827, and she received a refit under this expectation. On 1 December she was instead paid off alongside the 36-gun frigate HMS Dartmouth.

== Fate ==
Diamond was placed in ordinary in Porchester Lake at Portsmouth Dockyard. At about 8:00 on 18 February 1827 a fire began on board the ship. The flagship at Portsmouth, the 104-gun ship of the line HMS Victory, fired warning guns and sent out boats to fight the growing blaze. These were joined by others from the dockyard and efforts were made to quash it, but a strong easterly wind caused the fire to spread quickly. The rescuers took off the fourteen people who had been living on Diamond, including some women and children, and left the ship to burn to the waterline. The wreck sank at its moorings.

Reports afterwards suggested that the fire had been caused by hot cinders from the galley which were raked on to the deck, setting it alight and remaining unspotted by the warrant officers stationed on board. The wreck of the ship was brought in to dock on 28 May and broken up there in the following month.
