= Union (1799 ship) =

Liverpool slave ship

History

Great Britain
- Name: Union
- Acquired: 1799
- Fate: Foundered c.February 1801

General characteristics
- Tons burthen: 405, or 447 (bm)
- Complement: 25
- Armament: 16 × 12-pounder guns

Union was a ship that first appeared in records in 1799. She made one voyage as a slave ship in the triangular trade in enslaved people but foundered on her way home.

== Career ==
Union appeared in the 1800 volume of the Register of Shipping (RS).

Year	Master	Owner	Trade	Source & notes
1800	M'Gee	Hodgson	Liverpool–Africa	RS; raised and thorough repair 1790

Captain Thomas Moffat acquired a letter of marque on 9 December 1799. Captain Thomas Mollett sailed Union from London on 26 December 1799. In 1799, 156 vessels sailed from English ports, bound for Africa to participate in the acquisition and transport of enslaved people; 17 of these vessels sailed from London.

Union acquired captives at Accra and arrived at Demerara on 30 October 1800 with 384 captives.

On 15 January 1801, Union sailed from Demerara in company with Bolton, Watson, master, and Dart, Hensley, master. Both were enslaving ships with letters of marque. All were carrying sugar, coffee, indigo, and cotton. During the voyage Union started to take on water so her crew transferred to Bolton. Then Bolton and Dart parted company in a gale. (Dart arrived back at Liverpool on 11 March.)

On 5 March 1801 Bolton encountered the French privateer Gironde. Gironde was armed with 26 guns and had a complement of 260 men; reportedly, Bolton had 70 people (including passengers - presumably most of them the crew from Union), aboard her. Small arms fire from Gironde helped her overwhelm Bolton's defences; Gironde then ran into Bolton and captured her. The engagement, which lasted about an hour, caused considerable damage to both ships. Two passengers on Bolton were killed, and six of her crew, including Captain Watson, were wounded; Gironde had no casualties. (Note: Gironde had been commissioned in 1801 in Bordeaux under François Avesou.)

On 12 March HMS Leda recaptured Bolton, as Bolton was on her way to Bordeaux. Leda sent Bolton into Plymouth. Bolton arrived at Plymouth on 14 March.

In 1801, at least 23 British vessels in the triangular trade were lost. The source for this data did not record any losses as occurring on the homeward leg. This is not surprising as often reports in Lloyd's List, the source of the data, did not always specify which vessels sailing home from the West Indies were Guineamen. During the period 1793 to 1807, war, rather than maritime hazards or resistance by the captives, was the greatest cause of vessel losses among British enslaving vessels.
