= Dart (1787 ship) =

British merchant and slave ship (1787–18)

History

Great Britain
- Name: Dart
- Launched: 1787, Plymouth
- Fate: Condemned 1802

General characteristics
- Tons burthen: 210, or 234, or 250 (bm)
- Complement: 1798: 35; 1800: 20
- Armament: 1798: 16 × 9-pounder guns; 1800: 16 × 9-pounder guns

Dart was launched at Plymouth in 1787. Dart initially traded with Newfoundland and then the Mediterranean. From 1797 she made four voyages as a slave ship in the triangular trade in enslaved people. She was condemned at Barbados in 1802 as she was returning to London after having delivered captives to Demerara.

== Career ==
A missing volume means Dart first appeared in Lloyd's Register (LR) in 1789.

Year	Master	Owner	Trade	Source & notes
1789	J.Jack; J.Smith	Leigh & Co. St Barbe & Co.	London–Newfoundland; London–Smyrna	LR; new deck and raised 1790
1791	J.Smith; J.Christal	St Barbe & Co.	London–Smyrna	LR; new deck and raised 1790
1793	Wilkinson	Lubbock	London–Leghorn	LR; new deck and raised 1790

In 1797 John Bolton, a merchant of Liverpool, purchased Dart for the slave trade.

Year	Master	Owner	Trade	Source & notes
1797	Wilkinson; John Clare	Lubbock; John Bolton	London–Leghorn; Liverpool–Africa	LR; new deck and raised 1790

1st voyage transporting enslaved people (1797–1798): Captain John Clare sailed from Liverpool on 5 May 1797. In 1797, 104 vessels sailed from English ports, bound for the trade in enslaved people; 90 of these vessels sailed from Liverpool.

Dart acquired slaves in West Africa and Dart arrived at Martinique in April 1798 with 378 captives. Dart left Martinique on 16 May and arrived back at Liverpool on 29 June. She had left Liverpool with 34 crew members and had suffered seven crew deaths on her voyage.

2nd voyage transporting enslaved people (1798–1800): Captain William Neal acquired a letter of marque on 10 August 1798. He sailed from Liverpool on 8 September. In 1798, 160 vessels sailed from English ports, bound for the trade in enslaved people; 149 of these vessels sailed from Liverpool.

Dart arrived at Demerara on 20 July 1799 with 364 captives. William Kneale had died on 1 July. She sailed for Liverpool on 24 October with Thomas Waring as master and arrived there on 24 January 1800. She had left Liverpool with 35 crew members and had suffered 18 crew deaths on her voyage.

3rd voyage transporting enslaved people (1800–1801): Captain Samuel Helmsley acquired a letter of marque on 28 April 1800. He sailed from Liverpool on 21 May. In 1800, 133 vessels sailed from English ports, bound for the trade in enslaved people; 120 of these vessels sailed from Liverpool.

Dart arrived at Demerara on 1 December with 268 captives. She sailed from Demerara on 15 January 1801 and arrived at Liverpool on 11 March. She had left Liverpool with 41 crew members and she had suffered three crew deaths on her voyage.

On 12 March 1801, HMS Leda recaptured the enslaving ship Bolton, a 20-gun letter of marque that had sailed from Demerara for Liverpool some six weeks previously in company with Union and Dart. These two vessels were also enslaving ships and letters of marque, all carrying valuable cargoes of sugar, coffee, indigo and cotton. During the voyage Union started to take on water so her crew transferred to Bolton. Then Bolton and Dart parted company in a gale.

4th voyage transporting enslaved people (1801–loss): Captain Helmsley sailed from Liverpool on 22 May 1801. In 1801, 147 vessels sailed from English ports, bound for the trade in enslaved people; 122 of these vessels sailed from Liverpool.

Dart acquired captives at the Congo River and Dart arrived at Demerara on 21 November 1801.

== Fate ==
Lloyd's List reported in June 1802 that Dart, Helmsley, master, had put into Barbados on her way from Demerara to London. She was condemned at Barbados.

In 1802, 12 British enslaving vessels were lost. The census of losses for the year does not show any losses on the homeward-bound leg of the voyage. Absent detailed histories of vessels it is not always easy to identify a vessel such as Dart as a Guineaman if the report of the loss does not. The Peace of Amiens meant that war was not a major source of losses that year. In general, though, during the period 1793 to 1807, war, rather than maritime hazards or resistance by the captives, was the greatest cause of vessel losses among British slave vessels.

Dart's entry in Lloyd's Register for 1801 carried the annotation "Condemned".
