= HMS Nereus (1821) =

Frigate of the Royal Navy

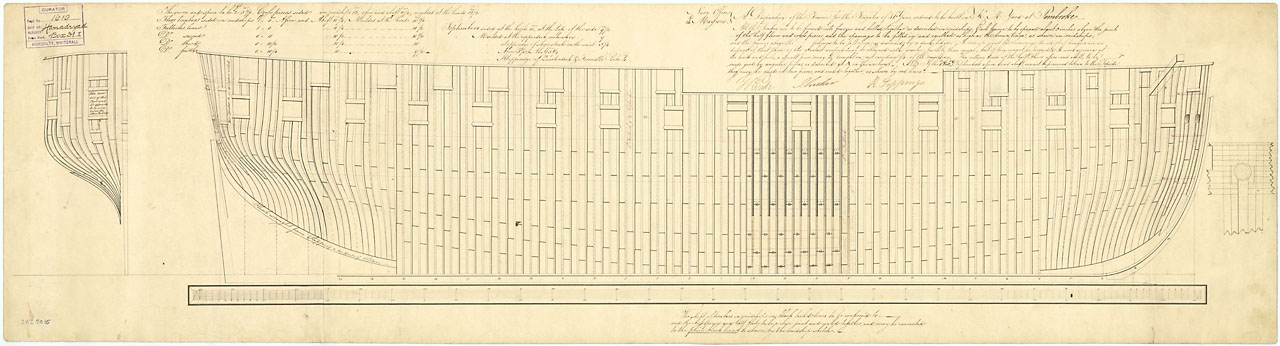
- Nereus

History

United Kingdom
- Name: Nereus
- Namesake: Nereus
- Ordered: 25 April 1817
- Builder: Pembroke Dockyard
- Laid down: January 1819
- Launched: 30 July 1821
- Completed: 12 September 1821
- Commissioned: Never
- Reclassified: As store ship and coal hulk, December 1843
- Fate: Sold for scrap, 22 January 1879

General characteristics
- Class & type: Modified Leda-class frigate
- Tons burthen: 1094 16/94 bm
- Length: 151 ft 10 in (46.3 m) (gundeck); 127 ft 6 in (38.9 m) (keel)
- Beam: 40 ft 6 in (12.3 m)
- Draught: 14 ft 6 in (4.4 m)
- Depth: 12 ft 9 in (3.9 m)
- Sail plan: Full-rigged ship
- Complement: 315
- Armament: 46 guns: Upper gundeck: 28 × 18-pdr cannon; Quarterdeck: 14 × 32-pdr carronades; Forecastle: 2 × 9-pdr cannon and 2 × 32-pdr carronades

HMS Nereus was a 46-gun modified Leda-class fifth-rate frigate built for the Royal Navy during the 1810s. She was never commissioned and was converted into a store ship in 1843 for service in South America. The ship was sold for into civilian service in 1879.

== Description ==
Nereus had a length at the gundeck of 151 feet 10 inches (46.3 m) and 127 feet 6 inches (38.9 m) at the keel. She had a beam of 40 feet 6 inches (12.3 m), a draught of 14 feet 6 inches (4.4 m) and a depth of hold of 12 feet 9 inches (3.9 m). The ship's tonnage was 1094 16/94 tons burthen. The modified Leda-class frigates were armed with twenty-eight 18-pounder cannon on her gundeck, fourteen 32-pounder carronades on her quarterdeck and a pair of 9-pounder cannon and two more 32-pounder carronades in forecastle. The ship had a crew of 315 officers and ratings.

== Construction and career ==
Nereus, the second ship of her name to serve in the Royal Navy, was ordered on 24 April 1817, laid down in January 1819 at Pembroke Dockyard, Wales, and launched on 30 July 1821. She was completed for ordinary at Plymouth Dockyard 22 August–12 September 1821 and the ship was roofed over from the mainmast forward. The ship cost £23,223 to build and £3,892 to fit out for ordinary. Nereus was converted for service at the cost of £10,557 as a store ship and coal hulk in August–December 1843 at Plymouth for service at Valparaíso, Chile. By December 1856, the ship was stationed in Callao, Peru, but had returned to Valparaíso by 1 August 1863. The following decade saw her at Coquimbo, Peru, by August 1874 and she was sold there for £500 on 22 January 1879.
