= Evert Andersen =

Norwegian sea captain

- Born: February 1, 1772; Lista, Denmark-Norway
- Died: July 29, 1809; Mandal, Denmark-Norway
- Military career
- Allegiance: Denmark–Norway
- Branch: (Denmark) Royal Dano-Norwegian Navy
- Service years: 1807-1809
- Rank: Captain
- Conflicts: Gunboat War; Dano-Swedish War of 1808–1809; Battle of Furuholm

Evert Andersen (1 February 1772 – 29 July 1809) was a Norwegian-Danish sea captain who fought in the Gunboat War against Great Britain and Sweden 1807–09.

== Early life ==
Andersen was a farmer's son from Lista who left his father's farm to his younger brother and went to sea. He enlisted as a gunner with the fluyt Eensgezindheid of the Dutch East India Company and made a three-year voyage from Amsterdam to Batavia between 1784 and 1787. Back in Norway he settled in Kristiansand, probably in 1805, marrying Helene Hansdatter Netland in 1807 and fathering three daughters.

== War ==
Following the Battle of Copenhagen (1807) and the surrender of the Danish/Norwegian fleet to the British, only one operational ship of the line was left uncaptured, the HDMS Prinds Christian Frederik, in Kristiansand. When news of the battle reached Kristiansand, along with accounts of British ships raiding up the coast, there was great fear in the town and a defence commission was hastily assembled.

Evert Andersen joined the reserves in Kristiansand as a non-commissioned officer on September 2, 1807 with the rank of lieutenant, on the defensive batteries. On 18 September HMS Spencer appeared with two other British ships to try and seize the Prinds Christian Frederik. The Spencer mounted attacks for several weeks but was eventually driven off by the coastal batteries.

Enlisted from month to month, he was discharged on December 4, but re-appointed March 7, 1808, as commander of a cannon dinghy. He took part in the Battle of Furuholm and was transferred to Arendal, before being given command of the schooner Activ.

At the beginning of August, 1808, he was also given command of the cutter Tiap. In action off Skagen on August 8, Activ and Tiap attacked a Swedish cutter which was supported by the British frigate Daphne. The Actif had twelve gunports but only had eight long 3-pounders mounted. Chased by the Daphne for six hours, she threw two of her guns overboard before she striking her colours. After surrendering Evert Andersen was imprisoned for a month in Gothenburg before returning to Frederikshavn. He was immediately given command of the cutter Lykkelig.

== Death ==
In 1809, Evert Andersen commanded the patrol boat Gripen, the cannon dinghy Thygeson No. 3, and the sloops Lister and Lyngdahl in Kristiansand's coastal defense squadron. With the two sloops he attacked a British schooner on July 28, 1809. Andersen was manning the cannon himself when it exploded and tore his left leg off. He was taken to Mandal but died the following day. He was buried with military honors in Kristiansand on August 7, 1809.
