= Francis Mason (Royal Navy officer) =

Royal Navy officer

Vice-Admiral Sir Francis Mason KCB
- Born: 10 February 1779; Bow, London
- Died: 27 May 1853 (aged 74); Eastbourne, Sussex
- Military career
- Allegiance: Kingdom of Great Britain
- Branch: Royal Navy
- Service years: 1793–1843
- Rank: Vice-Admiral
- Commands: HMS Daphne; HMS Fisgard; HMS President; HMS Blanche; HMS Blonde; South America Station; Mediterranean Fleet
- Conflicts: French Revolutionary Wars; Napoleonic Wars
- Awards: Knight Commander of the Order of the Bath

Vice-Admiral Sir Francis Mason KCB (10 February 1779 – 27 May 1853) was a senior Royal Navy officer who temporarily commanded the Mediterranean Fleet from October 1841 to April 1842.

== Naval career ==
Mason joined the Royal Navy on 23 May 1793. He took part in the action of 28 May 1794, the action of 29 May 1794 and the Glorious First of June. He was given command of the sloop HMS Rattler in December 1803. Promoted to post-captain he commanded, successively, the post ship HMS Daphne, in which he took part in the Walcheren Campaign in 1809, the fifth-rate HMS Fisgard, and the fifth-rate HMS President, in which he took part in the siege of San Sebastián in 1813. He went on to command, successively, the fifth-rate HMS Blanche and the fifth-rate HMS Blonde. He temporarily commanded the South America Station from July 1834 to September 1834 and temporarily commanded the Mediterranean Fleet from October 1841 to April 1842. He retired as a Vice-admiral of the White.

In 1805, he married the Hon. Selina Hood, daughter of Viscount Hood. They had 12 children.
