= HMS Daphne (1806) =

Ship, 1806

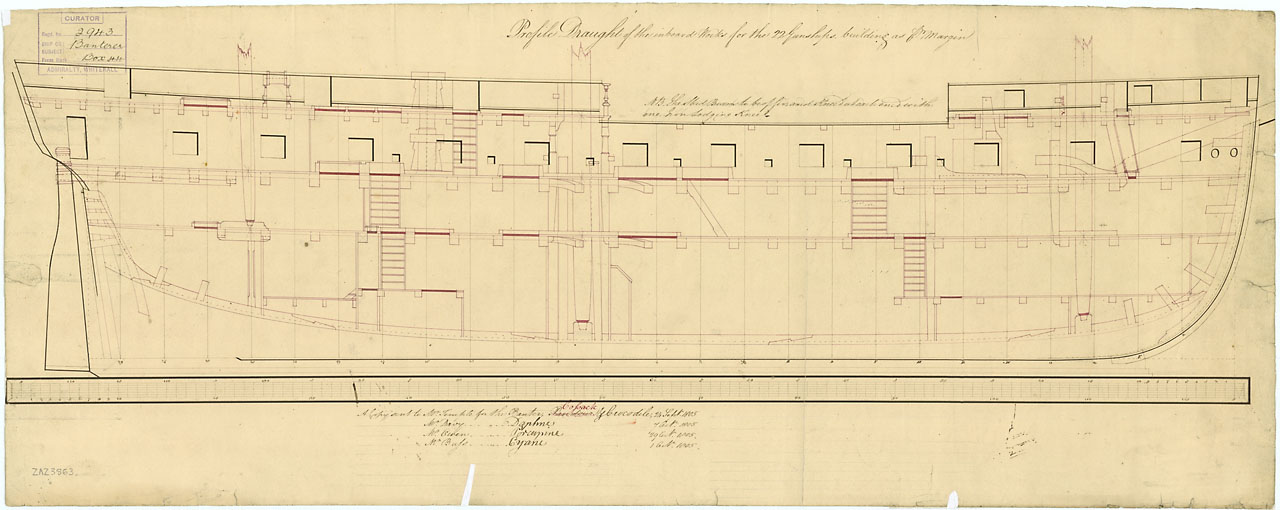
- Daphne

History

United Kingdom
- Name: HMS Daphne
- Ordered: 30 January 1805
- Builder: Robert Davy, Topsham
- Laid down: July 1805
- Fate: Sold 15 February 1816

General characteristics
- Type: Banterer-class post ship
- Tons burthen: 53932/94 (bm)
- Length: Overall:118 ft 2 in (36.0 m); Keel:98 ft 9 5/8 in (30.1 m)
- Beam: 32 ft 0 1/2 in (9.8 m)
- Depth of hold: 10 ft 6 in (3.2 m)
- Propulsion: Sail
- Complement: 155
- Armament: 1815; Upper deck:22 × 32-pounder carronades; QD:2 × 6-pounder guns + 4 × 8-pounder carronades; Fc:2 × 6-pounder guns + 4 × 8-pounder carronades

United Kingdom
- Name: Daphne
- Owner: Blanshard & Co.
- Acquired: 1816 by purchase
- Fate: Last listed 1824

General characteristics
- Tons burthen: 553, or 554 (bm)
- Propulsion: Sail

HMS Daphne was launched at Topsham, England in 1806. During her naval career Daphne operated primarily in the Baltic where she took part in one notable cutting-out expedition, and captured one small privateer and numerous small Danish merchant vessels. In 1816 the Admiralty sold her after the end of the Napoleonic Wars and she became a merchant ship, while retaining the name Daphne. She made one voyage to Australia in 1819 transporting convicts. Thereafter she traded with India and was last listed in 1824.

== Naval career ==
Captain Francis Mason commissioned Daphne in July 1806 and sailed her for the River Plate on 7 July There she took part in Commodore Home Riggs Popham's ill-fated expedition to capture Buenos Aires. On 6 January 1807 Daphne was in company with Pheasant and Leda at the capture of Ann, Dennison, master. (Note: A distribution of prize money in October 1818 resulted in a captain's share of £22 6½d; a seaman's share was worth 2s 10¼d.) Daphne had one man lightly wounded at the capture of Montevideo on 3 February 1807. She returned to England in December 1807.

She then served in the Baltic during the Gunboat War. On 23 April 1808 boats from Daphne and Tartarus, supported by the brig HMS Forward, drove ashore a Dano-Norwegian convoy at Flodstrand, near The Skaw on 22 April. The convoy was taking supplies for the relief of Norway as a result of food shortages that had occurred there after the British had begun their blockade between Denmark and Norway in 1807. The British went in under heavy fire from the shore and a castle there and brought out five brigs, three galliots, a schooner and a sloop (totalling some 870 tons burthen), for the loss of five men wounded, four on Daphne and one on Tartarus. In November there was a preliminary disbursement of £10,000 in prize money for the captured vessels. On 20 May Daphne and Tartarus captured the Danish brig Fisken.

Daphne and Havoc (or Fury) were in company on 23 June at the capture of the Danish vessels Roland, Twin Brothers (Twee Broeders), and Seaman (Samen). (Note: A captain's share of the prize money was worth £11 13s 4d; an able seaman's share was worth 4s 3d.)

On 4 August Daphne captured Karen Refine. Four days later Daphne captured the Danish naval schooner Acutif (or Actif), and drove on shore a cutter of four guns. Acutif, which was under the command of Second Lieutenant Evert Andersen, was pierced for 12 guns but had only eight long 3-pounders mounted. She threw two of them overboard during the six-hour chase before she struck. She and the cutter had left Christiansand three days earlier.

Captain William Roberts took command in August 1808. On 30 August Daphne and Ariadne captured a Danish vessel of unknown name. Prize money was paid in March 1819. (Note: A first-class (captain's) share was worth £7 18s 4½d; a sixth-class share, that of an ordinary seaman, was worth 2s 7d.)

On 18 September Daphne captured the ketch Drooning Margaretha. Between 18 September and 5 October, in addition to Drooning Magaretha, Daphne captured the galliots Good Hope, Hofnung, Elizabet Katherine, and three boats laden with grain.

Captain Philip Pipon replaced Roberts later in September.

On 21 July 1810 Daphne captured Good Hofnung and Pluto. (Note: The seventh and final payment of prize money occurred on 28 December 1820. A first-class share was worth £18 10s 7d; a sixth-class share was worth 3s 8¼d.) Then on 3 August Daphne and Pyramus were in company at the capture of the Danish vessels De Freed and Elizabeth. Then on 27 September Daphne and Plantagenet shared in the capture of the Danish schooner Toujours Fidele.

On 28 May 1811 Daphne captured Anna Margaretha Dorothea. On 7 June Daphne captured Nije Prowe. Daphne, Urgent, Raleigh, and Fancy were in company on 7 July at the capture of Die Hoffnung. Daphne and Urgent were in company on 11 July at the capture of Danish Transport №38.

Between 27 March and 8 April 1812, Plover captured Hans Ulrick, Eolus, Neptunus, Thygessen, Falken, Enighed, Caroline, and Enigheden. Plover shared the proceeds with Daphne, Pyramus, and Raleigh by prior agreement. On 21 April Daphne captured Catherina.

In March 1813 Captain James Green assumed command. Daphne then served as the flagship for Rear-Admiral Sir George Hope in the Baltic.

The "Principal Officers and Commissioners of His Majesty's Navy" offered "Daphne, of 22 guns and 540 tons", lying at Deptford, for sale on 11 January 1816. Daphne was sold at Deptford on 15 February 1816 for £2,300.

== Merchant career ==
Daphne appears in Lloyd's Register of 1816 with Appelby, master, Blanshard, owner, and trade London–Île de France.

Daphne left Port Jackson on 3 June 1818 bound for Calcutta.

Captain Hugh Mattison and surgeon Robert Armstrong sailed from Cork, Ireland on 28 May 1819, bound for Sydney, New South Wales. Daphne sailed via Teneriffe, arriving on 21 September 1819. Despite the stop in Teneriffe, the voyage took only 116 days. She had embarked some 180 male prisoners and 178 disembarked in Sydney. Men from the 46th, 48th, and 87th Regiments of Foot provided the guard detachment under the command of Captain Brooke. On 14 October 1819 Daphne sailed from Port Jackson for Bengal.

Lloyd's Register for 1821 shows Daphne's master changing from Matteson to Chatfield. Her trade became London–India or London–Madras.

In mid-1821 in the Atlantic Daphne, which was on her way to Madras, encountered the merchant ship Blenden Hall, which was on her way to Bombay. The weather being dead calm, Captain Greig spent a day on Daphne and had a "Most excellent dinner". On 22 July 1821 Blendan Hall was wrecked at Inaccessible Island, leaving her passengers and crew marooned for some six months.

On 16 May 1822 Daphne, Arthur A. Chatfield, master, H. Blanshard, owner, sailed to Madras. On her way on 27 August Daphne, Captain Chatfield, passed through the "Collomandous Channel" (2°21′N 73°8′E), in the Maldives, proving that though narrow, it was navigable.) By 10 September she was in Madras Roads.

A report on 28 August 1823 from a vessel arrived at Cowes stated that the vessel had fallen in with Daphne sailing from Batavia to Cowes. Daphne had damage to her sails and having "strained much by a heavy gale of wind off the Cape of Good Hope" that lasted 32 days.

Daphne is last listed in Lloyd's Register in 1823, and in the Register of Shipping in 1824.
