= Bolton (1792 ship) =

British slave ship (1792–1803)

History

Great Britain
- Name: Bolton
- Builder: Liverpool
- Launched: 1792
- Captured: 1803
- Fate: Blown up 30 September 1806

General characteristics
- Tons burthen: 298 (bm)
- Complement: 1793:42; 1797:40; 1800:29; 1801:25; 1803:30
- Armament: 1793:18 × 6-pounder guns; 1797:22 × 4&6-pounder guns; 1800:18 × 9-pounder guns; 1801:18 × 6-pounder guns; 1803:16 × 6-pounder guns

Bolton was launched at Liverpool in 1792. She then made 10 voyages as a slave ship in the triangular trade in enslaved people. During her career she repelled one attack by a French privateer, was captured on a later voyage by another before being recaptured by the Royal Navy, and then was captured on her tenth voyage by yet another privateer after Bolton had gathered her captives but before she was able to deliver them to the West Indies. Bolton returned to British ownership, first sailing as West Indiaman, before embarking on an 11th enslaving voyage. She blew up on the African coast in 1806 after some of the captives aboard her succeeded in taking her over and setting fire to her.

== Career ==
Bolton first appeared in Lloyd's Register (LR) with Jame Hird, master, Bolton & Co., owners, and trade Liverpool–Africa.

=== 1st voyage transporting enslaved people (1792–1793) ===
Captain James Hird sailed from Liverpool on 26 November 1792. (Note: Hird was the 15th leading slave captain of the period 1785–1807. He made nine enslaving voyages in six vessels for six owners.) Bolton acquired her captives at Bonny. She arrived at Dominica on 13 June 1793 with 351 captives. She sailed from Dominica on 18 August and arrived back at Liverpool on 1 October 1793. She had left with 32 crew members and suffered nine crew deaths on her voyage.

=== 2nd voyage transporting enslaved people (1793–1794) ===
War with France had broken out while Bolton was at Africa on her first voyage. Captain Roger Lee acquired a letter of marque on 23 October 1793. Bolton sailed from Liverpool on 17 November. Bolton arrived at Kingston, Jamaica on 17 April 1794. She had embarked 432 captives and she arrived with 431, having suffered only one captive death on the Middle Passage. She arrived back at Liverpool on 16 September 1794. She had left Liverpool with 49 crew members and suffered eight crew deaths on the voyage.

After the passage of Dolben's Act in 1788, masters received a bonus of £100 for a mortality rate of under 2%; the ship's surgeon received £50. For a mortality rate between two and three per cent, the bonus was halved. There was no bonus if mortality exceeded 3%. (Note: At the time the monthly wage for a captain of a slave ship out of Bristol was £5 per month.)

=== 3rd voyage transporting enslaved people (1794–1795) ===
Captain Lee sailed from Liverpool on 5 December 1794, bound to the Congo River area. Bolton started gathering captives on 22 February 1795. Captain lee died on 23 March. This was his sixth voyage as a captain. (Note: His will showed total assets of £680; effects were less than £300.) Captain Richard Hart replaced Lee. Bolton departed Africa on 20 May and arrived at Kingston on 30 June. She had embarked 432 captives, had arrived with 432, and landed 430. Bolton sailed from Kingston on 22 September.

Bolton, Hart, master, sailed in company with Union, a London ship with 20 guns and 40 men. On the 27th the two were off Cape Corrientes in a dead calm when a French privateer of eighteen guns and 140 men under the command of Captain O'Brien, an Irishman, approached using 24 sweeps (long, large oars). An exchange of gunfire between Bolton and the privateer ensued and lasted for an hour and a half. The privateer had come up in such a way that Bolton was between the privateer and Union, which therefore could not bring her guns to bear. When a breeze came up the privateer sailed away. Bolton arrived back at Liverpool on 8 November. (Note: Union was the former HMS Squirrel. She was under the command of Captain James Thomson. Hackman confuses this Union with the Union that was the former HMS Terror.) Bolton had left Liverpool with 34 men and had suffered five crew deaths during her voyage.

=== 4th voyage transporting enslaved people (1796–1797) ===
Captain Hart sailed from Liverpool on 25 February 1796. In 1796, 103 vessels sailed from English ports, bound to Africa to acquire and transport captives; 94 of these vessels sailed from Liverpool.

Bolton arrived at Demerara on 8 January 1797. She sailed from Demerara on 6 May and arrived back at Liverpool on 10 July. She had left Liverpool with 33 crew members and she had suffered nine crew deaths on her voyage.

=== 5th voyage transporting enslaved people (1797–1798) ===
Captain Timothy Boardman acquired a letter of marque on 18 September 1797. Bolton sailed from Liverpool on 5 October. In 1797, 104 vessels sailed from English ports, bound to Africa to acquire and transport captives; 90 of these vessels sailed from Liverpool.

Bolton arrived at Martinique on 3 July 1798 with 431 captives. She sailed from Martinique on 27 July and arrived back at Liverpool on 16 September. She had left Liverpool with 48 crew members and she had suffered six crew deaths on her voyage.

=== 6th voyage transporting enslaved people (1798–1799) ===
Captain Boardman sailed from Liverpool on 12 November 1798. In 1798, 160 vessels sailed from English ports, bound to Africa to acquire and transport captives; 149 of these vessels sailed from Liverpool. This was the largest number of vessels in the period 1795–1804.

Bolton acquired captives at Bonny and arrived at St Vincent 29 July 1799 with 372 captives. She sailed from St Vincent on 1 August and arrived back at Liverpool on 14 October. She had left Liverpool with 46 crew members and she had suffered nine crew deaths on her voyage.

=== 7th voyage transporting enslaved people (1800–1801) ===
Captain John Watson acquired a letter of marque on 28 April 1800. He sailed from Liverpool on 22 May 1800, bound for the Gold Coast. In 1800, 133 vessels sailed from English ports, bound to Africa to acquire and transport captives; 120 of these vessels sailed from Liverpool.

Bolton arrived at Demerara on 28 November with 266 slaves.

Around 15 January 1801, Bolton sailed from Demerara in company with Union, Mollett, master, and Dart, Hensley, master. Both were slave ships with letters of marque; John Bolton, Bolton's owner, also owned Dart. All were carrying sugar, coffee, indigo, and cotton. During the voyage Union started to take on water so her crew transferred to Bolton. Then Bolton and Dart parted company in a gale. (Dart arrived back at Liverpool on 11 March.)

On 5 (or 12) March 1801 Bolton encountered the French privateer Gironde. (Note: Gironde had been commissioned in 1801 in Bordeaux under François Avesou.) Gironde was armed with 26 guns and had a complement of 260 men; reportedly, Bolton had 70 people (including passengers – presumably most of them the crew from Union), aboard her. Small arms fire from Gironde helped her overwhelm Bolton's crew; Gironde then ran into Bolton and captured her. The engagement, which lasted about an hour, caused considerable damage to both ships. Two passengers on Bolton were killed, and six of her crew, including Captain Watson, were wounded; Gironde had no casualties. Bolton also had a tiger and a large collection of birds and monkeys on her.

On 12 March HMS Leda recaptured Bolton, as Bolton was on her way to Bordeaux. Leda sent Bolton into Plymouth. Bolton arrived at Plymouth on 14 March. Bolton arrived back at Liverpool on 10 April. Bolton had left Liverpool with 48 crew members and had suffered four crew deaths on her voyage.

=== 8th voyage transporting enslaved people (1801–1802) ===
Captain John Reddie sailed from Liverpool on 21 June 1801. In 1801, 147 vessels sailed from English ports, bound to Africa to acquire and transport captives; 122 of these vessels sailed from Liverpool.

Bolton arrived at St Vincent on 10 December. She sailed from St Vincent on 10 January 1802 and arrived back at Liverpool on 20 February. She had sailed from Liverpool with 39 men and had suffered no crew deaths on her voyage.

=== 9th voyage transporting enslaved people (1802–1803) ===
Captain John Reddie acquired a letter of marque on 26 May 1802. Captain Reddie sailed from Liverpool on 20 May 1802, bound for Bonny. In 1802, 155 vessels sailed from English ports, bound to Africa to acquire and transport captives; 122 of these vessels sailed from Liverpool.

Bolton arrived at Barbados on 16 November with 265 captives. She sailed from Barbados on 1 December and arrived back at Liverpool on 28 January 1803. She had left Liverpool with 29 crew members and suffered no crew deaths on the voyage.

=== 10th voyage transporting enslaved people (1803) ===
Captain John Spence acquired a letter of marque on 23 May 1803. He sailed from Liverpool on 3 June 1803. In 1803, 99 vessels sailed from English ports, bound to Africa to acquire and transport captives; 83 of these vessels sailed from Liverpool.

=== Capture ===
The Lancaster Gazette and General Advertiser, for Lancashire, Westmorland, &c. reported on 14 January 1804 that a French privateer had captured Bolton, Spence, master, 50 leagues windward of Barbados. In the two-and-a-half hour engagement that preceded her capture Spence and a seaman were killed, and four seamen were dangerously wounded. The privateer was armed with 40 guns and had a crew of 150 men. She took Bolton into Point Petre, Guadeloupe.

Bolton arrived at Montevideo on 17 December 1803 with 271 captives.

In 1803, eleven British slave ships were lost, seven of them in the Middle Passage, sailing from Africa to the West Indies. This was the smallest annual loss in the entire period from 1793 to 1807. During this period war, rather than maritime hazards or resistance by the captives, was the greatest cause of vessel losses among British slave vessels.

=== Return to British ownership ===
Bolton returned to British ownership. The 1805 volume of Lloyd's Register carried that annotation "captured" beneath her name, possibly struck out. It also showed her with a change of master and owner.

Year	Master	Owner	Trade	Source & notes
1805	J.Reddie; Grayson	Bolton & Co. Williams	Liverpool–Africa	LR; repaired 1800

Initially, Bolton sailed as a West Indiaman. Lloyd's List reported in July 1805 that she had reached Nevis from Liverpool and Madeira. On 14 October she arrived back at Liverpool from Nevis.

=== 11th voyage transporting enslaved people (1806) ===
Captain Patrick Burleigh sailed from Liverpool on 4 July 1806, bound for West Africa. (Note: This was Burleigh's first voyage as master of a slave ship. He had made four previous voyages as a ship's surgeon on slave ships.) Lloyd's List reported that Bolton, of Liverpool, had blown up on 30 September.

The Trans-Atlantic Slave Trade database noted that Bolton had been shipwrecked or destroyed, after embarkation of slaves or during slaving. However, a source on insurrections by captives reports that 12 slaves were killed when Bolton blew up.

Hugh Crow, the famous captain of slave ships, gave a detailed account of what had happened. Bolton had embarked about 120 captives. During the night some of the captives were able to free themselves from their irons. They took over the ship and proceeded to bring some barrels of powder that she was carrying to trade up on deck, and start pouring it around. Crow and some other captains from the vessels there went on board. They were able to persuade the women and a number of the captives to leave Bolton and go onboard the other ships. Eventually, all but about a dozen captives, the ringleaders, left Bolton. The next day Bolton caught fire and blew up, killing the men who had remained aboard.

In 1806, 33 British slave ships were lost, eight of them on the coast of Africa. Bolton was one of the very few cases where a vessel was lost to an insurrection where the captives succeeded in taking over the vessel.
