= HMS Arethusa (1817) =

Frigate of the Royal Navy

History

United Kingdom
- Name: Arethusa
- Namesake: Arethusa
- Ordered: 22 November 1812
- Builder: Pembroke Dockyard
- Laid down: February 1815
- Launched: 27 July 1817
- Completed: 29 September 1817
- Commissioned: Never
- Renamed: As Bacchus, 12 March 1844
- Reclassified: As a quarantine ship, 1836; As coal hulk, 1851
- Fate: Sold for scrap, 14 August 1883

General characteristics
- Class & type: Leda-class frigate
- Tons burthen: 1084 60/94 bm
- Length: 150 ft 11 in (46.0 m) (gundeck); 126 ft 11 in (38.7 m) (keel)
- Beam: 40 ft 1 in (12.2 m)
- Draught: 14 ft 7 in (4.4 m)
- Depth: 12 ft 9 in (3.9 m)
- Sail plan: Full-rigged ship
- Complement: 315
- Armament: 46 guns: Upper gundeck: 28 × 18-pdr cannon; Quarterdeck: 14 × 32-pdr carronades; Forecastle: 2 × 9-pdr cannon and 2 × 32-pdr carronades

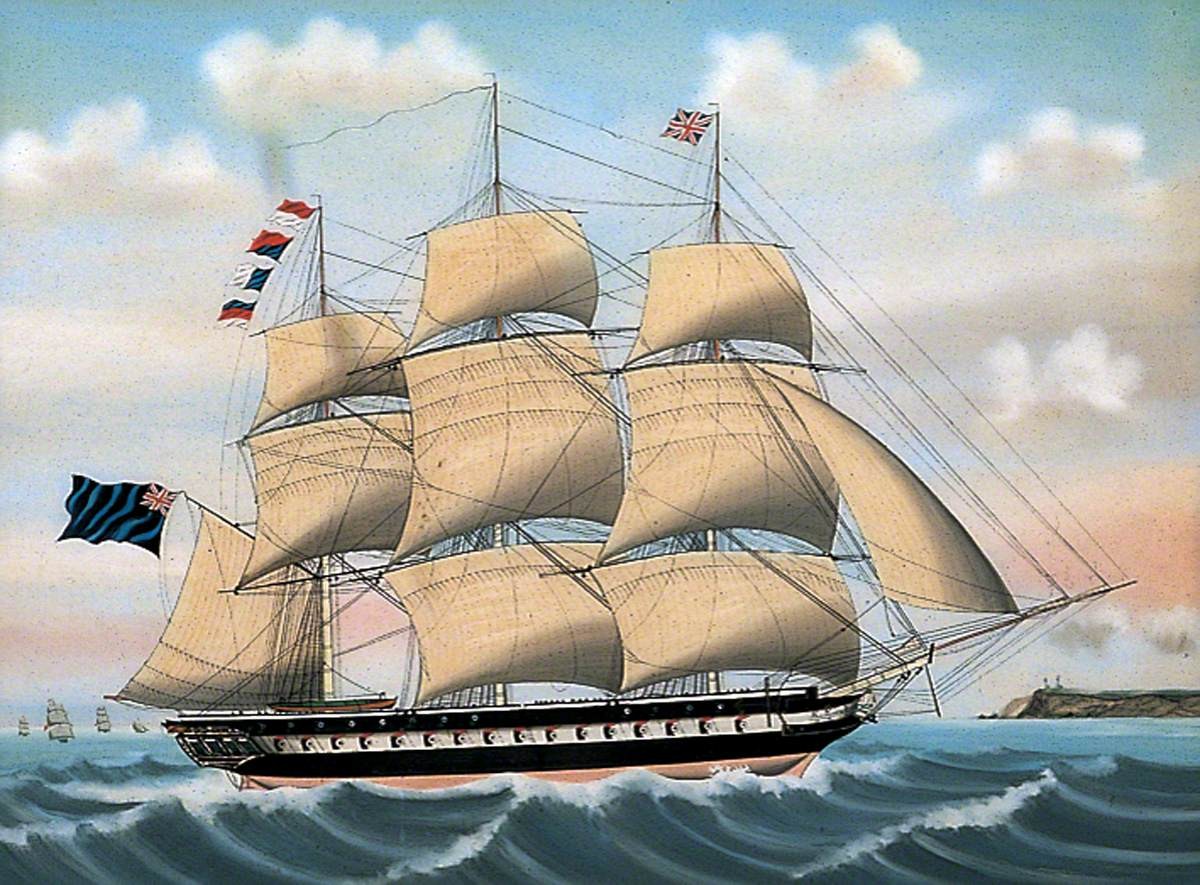
Medium oil on glass painting of the HMS Arethusa by P.W.

HMS Arethusa was a 46-gun Leda-class fifth-rate frigate built for the Royal Navy during the 1810s. The ship was never commissioned and was converted into a lazarette (quarantine ship) in 1836. She was renamed HMS Bacchus in 1844 and was further converted into a coal hulk in 1851–52. The ship was sold for scrap in 1883.

== Description ==
Arethusa had a length at the gundeck of 150 feet 11 inches (46.0 m) and 126 feet 11 inches (38.7 m) at the keel. She had a beam of 40 feet 1 inch (12.2 m), a draught of 14 feet 7 inches (4.4 m) and a depth of hold of 12 feet 9 inches (3.9 m). The ship's tonnage was 1084 60/94 tons burthen. The Leda-class frigates were armed with twenty-eight 18-pounder cannon on her gundeck, fourteen 32-pounder carronades on her quarterdeck and a pair of 9-pounder cannon and two more 32-pounder carronades in forecastle. The ship had a crew of 315 officers and ratings.

== Construction and career ==
Arethusa, the fourth ship of her name to serve in the Royal Navy, was ordered on 22 November 1812, laid down in February 1815 at Pembroke Dockyard, Wales, and launched on 29 July 1817. She sailed for Plymouth Dockyard on 21 August 1817 and was completed for ordinary on 27 September at the cost of £25,923. The ship was never on active duty and was converted for service as a lazarette for Liverpool in April–June 1836. Arethusa was renamed HMS Bacchus on 12 March 1844 to release her name for the large frigate being built and converted into a coal hulk in 1851–52. The ship was sold to Castle & Sons for £1,450 on 14 August 1883 to be broken up.
