= Manuel Inácio Martins Pamplona Corte Real, 1st Count of Subserra =

Portuguese nobleman and politician

Manuel Martins Pamplona
- Count of Subserra
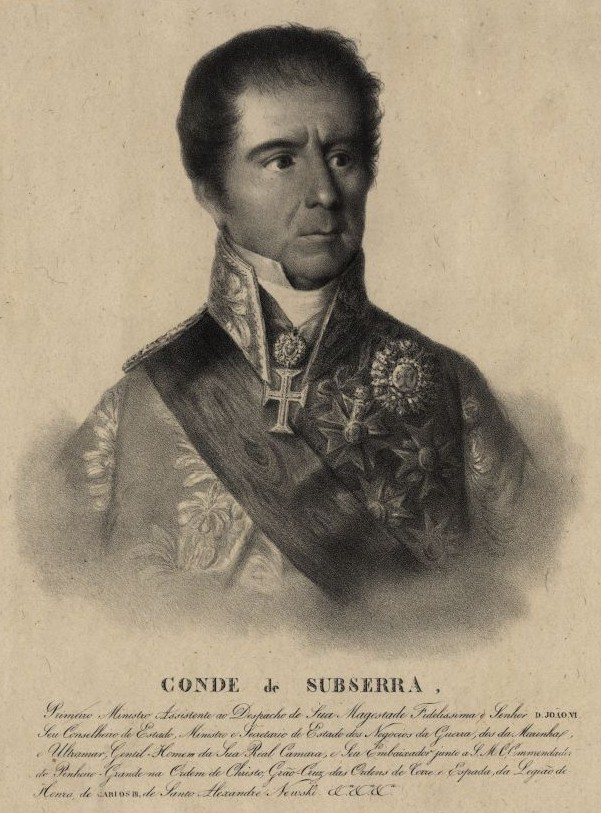

Count of Subserra
- Full name: Manuel Inácio Martins Pamplona Corte Real
- Born: 3 July 1760; Angra do Heroismo, Portuguese Empire
- Died: 16 October 1832 (aged 72); Elvas, Kingdom of Portugal
- Noble family: Corte Real
- Spouse: Isabel Antónia do Carmo de Roxas e Lemos Carvalho e Meneses
- Father: André Diogo Martins Pamplona Corte Real
- Mother: Josefa Jacinta Merens de Távora

D. Manuel Inácio Martins Pamplona Corte Real, 1st Count of Subserra (3 July 1760 – 16 October 1832) was a Portuguese nobleman and politician.

== Early life ==
Manuel Inácio Martins Pamplona Corte Real was born in Angra do Heroismo on Terceira Island in the Azores archipelago in Portugal on July 3, 1760 to André Diogo Martins Pamplona Corte Real and Josefa Jacinta Merens de Távora. Some doubts remain about his age as he apparently claimed to be younger than he was in order to enhance his promotion prospects in France. As a child he was sent from the Azores to the Royal College of Nobles in Lisbon, but when he arrived there he found it closed for reorganization and went instead to the Royal College of Mafra. While in Mafra he had contact with Prince D. João, the future King D. João VI. He then moved to the Faculty of Mathematics of the University of Coimbra. After Coimbra he decided to adopt a military career, enlisting as an officer in the Cavalry Regiment of Santarém at a relatively advanced age for the time. He later served in the Russian and French armies, achieving the rank of General in both Portugal and France and becoming a naturalized French citizen. He was given the title of Baron de Pamplona by Louis XVIII.

== Political career ==
Pamplona Corte Real was Prime Minister as well as minister for several other portfolios, including Minister of War, under D. João VI. He was a member of the Constituent Cortes of 1820, Portugal's first effective Parliament. Pamplona Corte Real was awarded the title of Count of Subserra. He was also later Portugal's Ambassador to Madrid. However, he was a freemason who showed sympathy for the ideals of the French Revolution, and adhered to the Liberal movement in Portugal.

== Imprisonment and death ==
In June 1828, Pamplona Corte Real was arrested by the express order of King Miguel I of Portugal and held incommunicado at the Belém Tower. He was later moved and imprisoned at Graça Fort in Elvas. It was in that prison that he died on 16 October 1832. After the end of the Portuguese Civil War, his remains were moved to the Chapel of Santa Catarina in Biscoitos on Terceira Island.
