= South America Station =

Commander-in-Chief South America
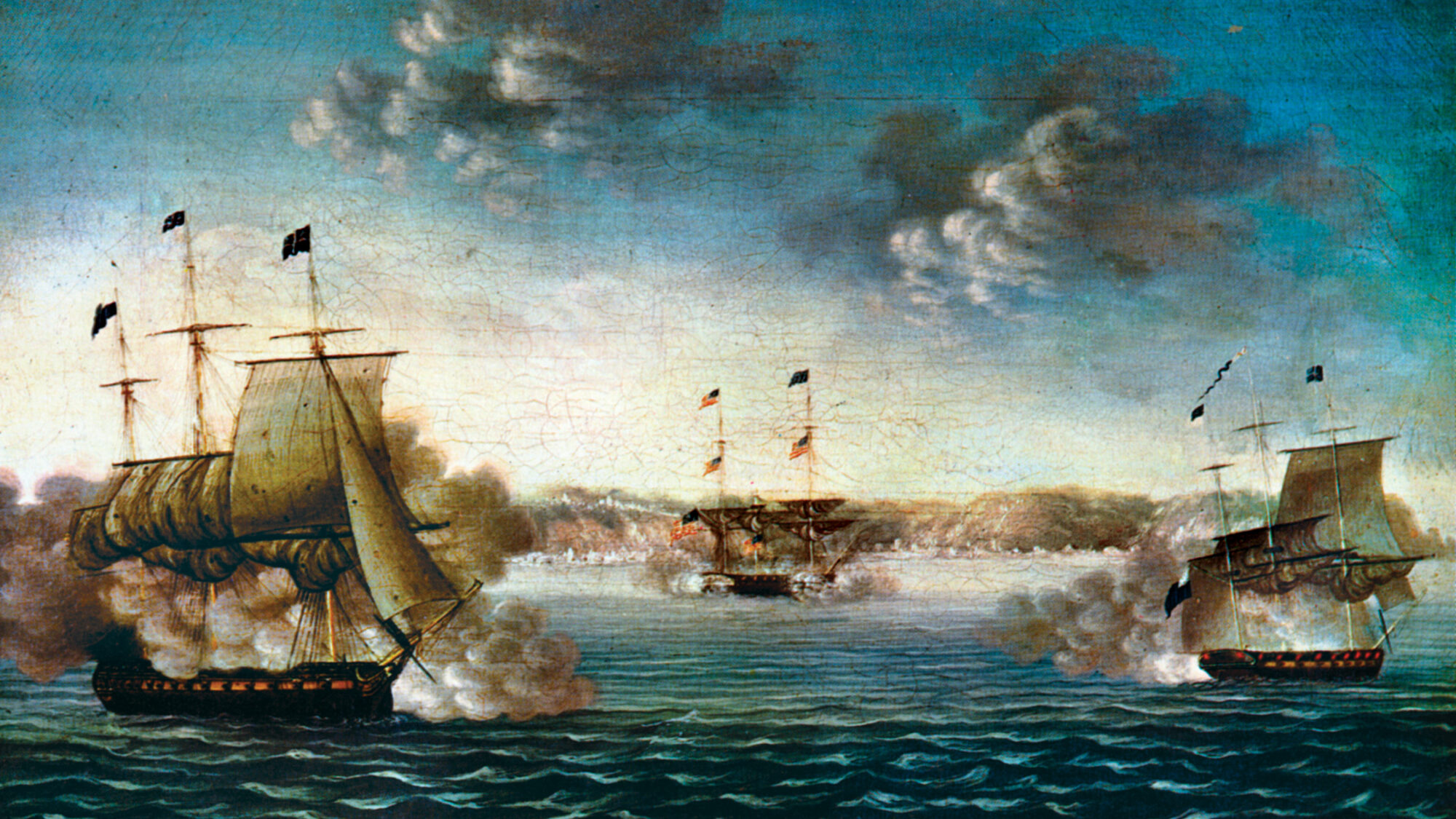
- The capture of USS Essex by Phoebe and Cherub off Valparaíso, 28 March 1814
- Country: United Kingdom
- Branch: Royal Navy
- Type: Formation

The South America Station was a formation of the Royal Navy which existed from 1808 to 1838 when it was split into the Pacific Station and the South East Coast of America Station.

Following the invasion of Portugal by Napoleon, the Portuguese court escaped to Brazil with an escort of the Royal Navy under the command of Admiral Sidney Smith. Following the establishment of the Portuguese Court in Rio de Janeiro in early 1808, was shortly followed by the reinforcement of Smith's escort and the establishment of the Brazil or South America Station.

The commander-in-chief heading the formation played a diplomatic role in South America in the early nineteenth century as the British diplomatic service was limited to having a representative in Brazil.

== Commanders-in-chief ==
List of commanders-in-chief, South America (1808–1837)
Commander-in-chief	From	Until	Notes
Rear Admiral William Sidney Smith	25 January 1808	17 May 1809	
Vice Admiral Michael de Courcy	18 May 1809	1812	
Rear Admiral Manley Dixon	1812	1816	
Commodore William Bowles	1816	17 May 1819	
Commodore Thomas Hardy	18 May 1819	16 November 1823	
Rear Admiral George Eyre	16 November 1823	1826	
Rear Admiral Robert Otway	1826	1829	Later promoted to Admiral, flagship was HMS Ganges
Rear Admiral Thomas Baker	9 January 1829	January 1833	Promoted to vice admiral 10 January 1837
Rear Admiral Sir Michael Seymour	1 January 1833	9 July 1834	Died en route to station
Commodore Francis Mason	July 1834	16 September 1834	Temporary command after death of Seymour
Vice Admiral Graham Hammond	16 September 1834	17 May 1838	Promoted to Vice Admiral 10 January 1837
