= Leda-class frigate =

Class of Royal Navy frigates

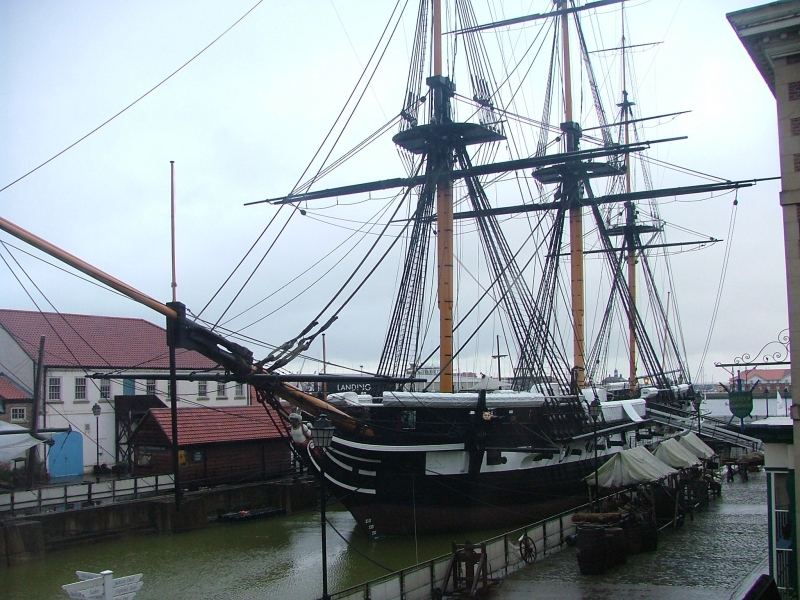
- HMS Trincomalee, one of the two surviving members of the class.

Class overview
- Name: Leda class
- Operators: Royal Navy
- Subclasses: Modified Leda class
- Built: 1805 - the last 2 ordered were cancelled in 1832
- Planned: 53
- Completed: 47
- Canceled: 6
- Preserved: 2

General characteristics
- Class & type: 38-gun frigate
- Tons burthen: 106279/94 (bm)
- Length: 150 ft 1 1/2 in (45.758 m) (gundeck); 125 ft 4 7/8 in (38.224 m) (keel)
- Beam: 39 ft 11 in (12.17 m)
- Depth of hold: 12 ft 9 in (3.89 m)
- Sail plan: Full-rigged ship
- Complement: 284 (later 300);
- Armament: Upper deck: 28 × 18-pounder guns; Fc: 2 × 9-pounder guns + 2 × 32-pounder carronades; QD: 8 × 9-pounder guns + 6 × 32-pounder carronades

The Leda-class frigates were a ship class of forty-seven 38-gun fifth-rate frigates constructed from 1805 to 1832 for the Royal Navy. Based on a French design, the class came in five major groups, all with minor differences in their design. During their careers, they fought in the Napoleonic Wars and the War of 1812. Forty-five of the 47 were eventually scrapped; two still exist: HMS Trincomalee and HMS Unicorn.

== Origins ==
The design of the name ship, Leda of 1800, was based on the French shipwright Jacques-Noël Sané's design for the French Navy's Hébé-class frigate. The British 44-gun fifth rate HMS Rainbow captured Hébé in 1782. (The British took Hébé into service as HMS Hebe but in 1805 renamed her HMS Blonde). The class of frigates built to the lines of Leda were in contemporary parlance called the 'Repeat Leda class'.

Pomone and Shannon, the second and third ship of the class respectively, was built using Josiah Brindley's patent method of construction which dispensed with 'lodging' and 'hanging knees', oak elements that had to be grown to shape. Oak suitable for shipbuilding had become increasingly difficult to obtain through the long period of warfare. Bindley's fastenings proved to be weak. Captain Philip Broke of Shannon claimed her topsides were weak and "worked like a basket." Shannon was actually in such poor condition by 1813 that she almost missed her engagement with the USS Chesapeake.

== Characteristics and performance ==
The vessels of the class were fast, most recording 13 knots (24 km/h; 15 mph) large and 10 knots (19 km/h; 12 mph) close-hauled. However, their French-style proportions made them unweatherly compared to frigates designed to British proportions (such as the Lively class). Many captains requested additions to the frigates' false keels to remedy this. The Leda class stood to their canvas well and liked a stiff gale, but were prone to excessive pitching in very heavy seas. All captains complained of the class's poor stowage capacity, the result of their fine French underwater lines, but stowage improved after the introduction of iron fresh-water tanks. Lastly, captains considered the class to be "wet", a result of lively rolling and pitching causing seams to loosen.

== Ships of the class ==
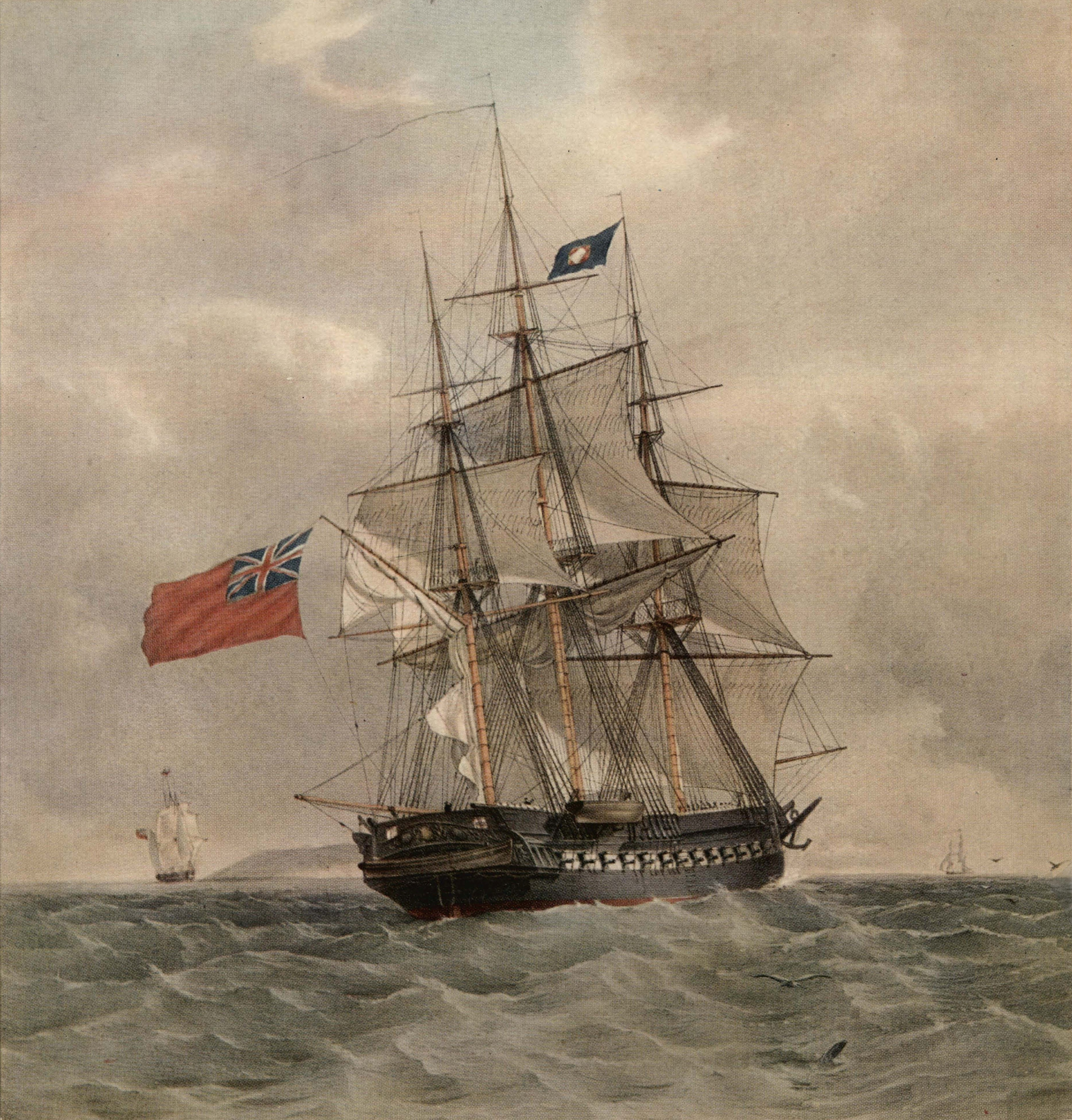
HMS Pomone

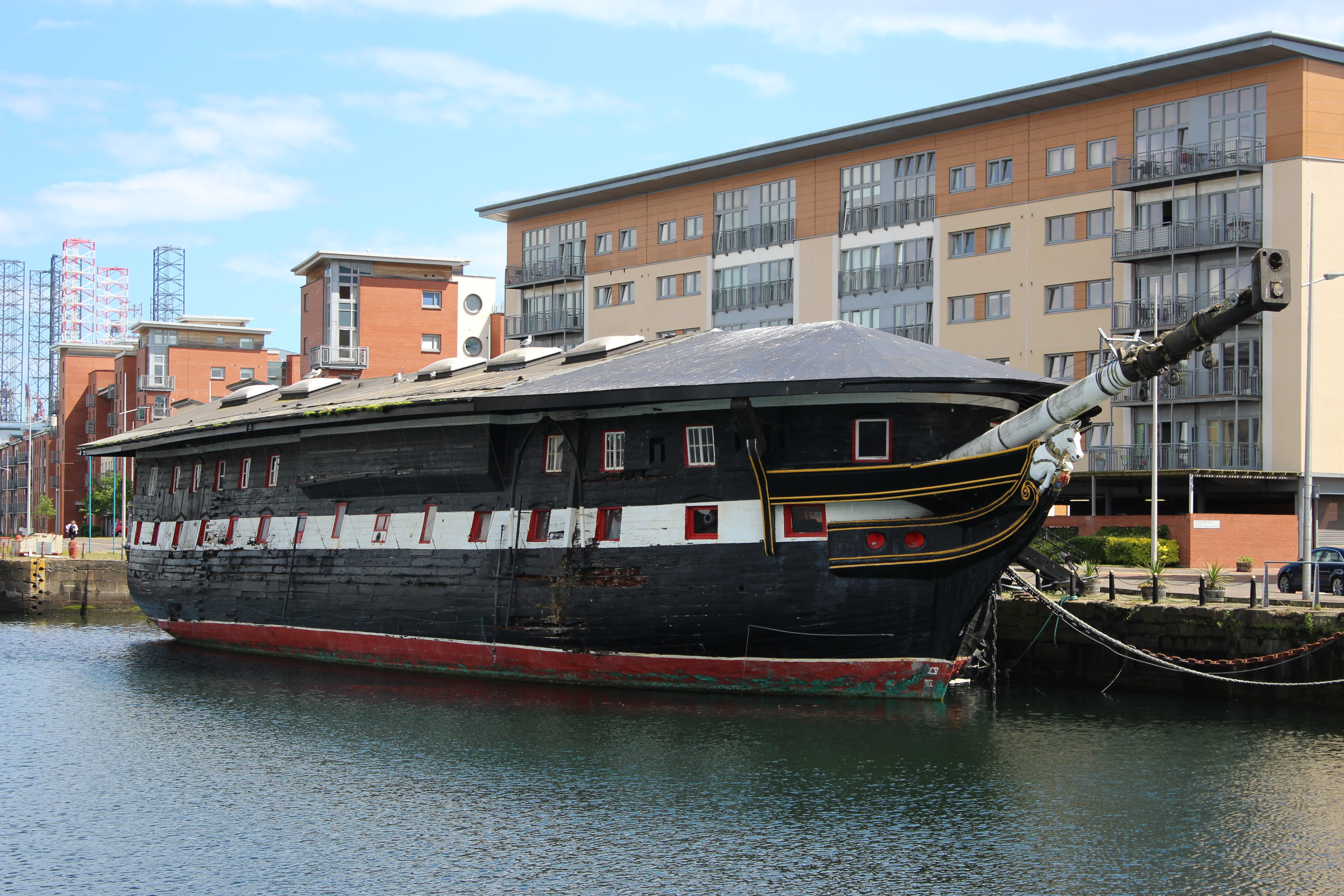
HMS Unicorn

The name Leda was taken from Greek mythology, as was common at the time; the Greek Leda was a woman whom Zeus seduced while he was masquerading as a swan. After Leda, the Admiralty had no more ships to this design for several years. Then with the resumption of war with France either looming or under way, the Admiralty ordered eight further ships to this design in 1802-09:

- HMS Pomone, wrecked on The Needles in 1811.
- HMS Shannon, the victor over USS Chesapeake, off Boston, on 1 June 1813.
- HMS Leonidas
- HMS Briton
- HMS Tenedos
- HMS Lacedemonian
- HMS Lively ex-Scamander
- HMS Surprise

In 1812 the Admiralty ordered eight ships to be built of "fir" (actually, of red pine) instead of oak; these were sometimes called the Cydnus class:

- HMS Cydnus
- HMS Eurotas
- HMS Niger
- HMS Meander
- HMS Pactolus
- HMS Tiber
- HMS Araxes
- HMS Tanais

The Admiralty ordered seven more vessels to this design in 1812–15, with those constructed in Britain reverting to oak and those constructed in Bombay using teak:

- HMS Diamond
- HMS Amphitrite
- HMS Trincomalee, has survived to the present day.
- HMS Thetis
- HMS Arethusa
- HMS Blanche
- HMS Fisgard

The Admiralty ordered another six vessels in 1816, but of a modified design that incorporated Sir Robert Seppings's circular stern and "small-timber" form of construction:

- HMS Venus
- HMS Melampus
- HMS Minerva
- HMS Latona
- HMS Diana
- HMS Hebe

A further twenty-three ships were ordered to this modified design in 1817, although the last six were never completed, or not completed to this design:

- HMS Nereus
- HMS Hamadryad, in 1866 became a hospital ship moored in Cardiff, which in 1905 was replaced by the Royal Hamadryad Hospital.
- HMS Amazon
- HMS Aeolus
- HMS Thisbe, used as a floating church in Cardiff from 1863 to 1891.
- HMS Cerberus
- HMS Circe
- HMS Clyde
- HMS Thames
- HMS Fox, completed 1856 as a screw frigate
- HMS Unicorn, another sailing frigate that has survived to the present day.
- HMS Daedalus, completed 1844 as a 19-gun sixth-rate corvette, which also claimed to sight a sea monster, which was actually found to be a whale.
- HMS Proserpine
- HMS Mermaid
- HMS Mercury
- HMS Penelope
- HMS Thalia

The last six ships of the 1817 orders were never completed to this design:

- HMS Pegasus – canceled 1831
- HMS Nemesis – re-ordered to Seringapatam-class design.
- HMS Statira – re-ordered to Seringapatam-class design.
- HMS Jason – re-ordered to Seringapatam-class design.
- HMS Druid – re-ordered to Seringapatam-class design.
- HMS Medusa – canceled 1831
