= Onslow (1817 ship) =

British ship

History

United Kingdom
- Name: Onslow
- Namesake: Onslow, Nova Scotia
- Launched: 1817, Onslow, Nova Scotia
- Fate: Foundered on 30 July 1829

General characteristics
- Tons burthen: 129 (bm)

Onslow was launched at Onslow, Nova Scotia in 1817. She moved to England in 1818 and traded with Canada and the West Indies. She foundered on 30 July 1829.

== Career ==
Onslow was registered at Halifax, Nova Scotia, but then re-registered in New Brunswick on 9 October 1820. Even before then she had appeared in Lloyd's Register (LR). She first appeared in the volume for 1818.

Year	Master	Owner	Trade	Source
1818	S.Clark	Captain & Co.	Nova Scotia–Cork	LR
1821	S.Clark; J.Crews	M'Cullem	Liverpool–Larne; Dartmouth–New Brunswick	LR
1823	J.Crews; Matthews	Hilchings; T.Amos	Dartmouth–New Brunswick; Liverpool–Barbados	LR

Owners did not necessarily keep Lloyd's Register up-to-date. Onslow also traded with Demerara. On 8 October 1822 Onslow, Paul, master put into Barbados. She had been sailing from Saint Andrews, New Brunswick to Demerara when she capsized on 29 September at 17°N 54°W. She had lost her masts, deck load, etc.

Year	Master	Owner	Trade	Source & notes
1824	G.Matthews	T.Amos	Liverpool–Barbados	LR; good repair 182_
1825	G.Matthews	Fotheringham	Dublin–Liverpool	LR; damages repaired 1824
1827	Henderson; Jacob	Fotheringham	Dublin–Barbados	LR; damages repaired 1824; new deck & small repairs 1826
1828	J.Jacobs; M.Walsh	J.Adair	Dublin–Trinidad	LR; damages repaired 1824

== Fate ==
On 30 July 1829, Onslow, Walsh, master, sprang a leak and foundered. When she had eight feet of water in her hold her crew abandoned her; they arrived at St Thomas's. At the time she was on a voyage from Trinidad to Liverpool.
