= Adolphe (1807 privateer lugger) =

History

France
- Owner: Robert Surcouf
- Launched: 1807
- Fate: Captured 1807

General characteristics
- Sail plan: Lugger
- Complement: 70
- Armament: 10 × 18-pounder carronades + 4 × 4-pounder & 2 × 2-pounder guns + 2 swivel guns

Adolphe was launched in 1807 and captured on 4 December 1807 after having taken several British prizes.

French sources reported that Adolphe had brought into Cherbourg on 13 November 1807 Young William, which Adolphe had captured on 10 November off the Isle of Wight. Young William had been on her way to Weymouth with a cargo of herring when Adolphe captured her. Then on 15 November Adolphe brought into Cherbourg the brig Friendship, of Cowes, which was carrying a cargo of coals, lead, etc.

At eight o'clock on the morning of 4 December, some 4 leagues (19 km) off Cap de Caux, HMS Leda sighted a privateer lugger making for the French coast, as well as a brig that appeared to be her prize. The brig ran for Havre de Grace but the lugger sailed in another direction as Leda pursued her. After six hours Leda succeeded in capturing the lugger, which turned out to be the brand new vessel Adolphe, under the command of Nicholas Famenter. She was eight days out of Boulogne. She had only 25 men on board as she had already put another 45 men of her crew on prizes. On her way to Britain she ran on shore at Bembridge Ledge; there was little hope of getting her off.

Despite the earlier reports, Adolphe was gotten off and was brought into Portsmouth a few days later.

After Adolphe's capture, two more of her prizes arrived in French ports. On 29 December a British vessel laden with corn arrived at Cherbourg. Then on 5 January 1808 the British brig Experiment arrived at Dieppe. She had a cargo of provisions.
