= HMS Leda (1800) =

Frigate of the Royal Navy

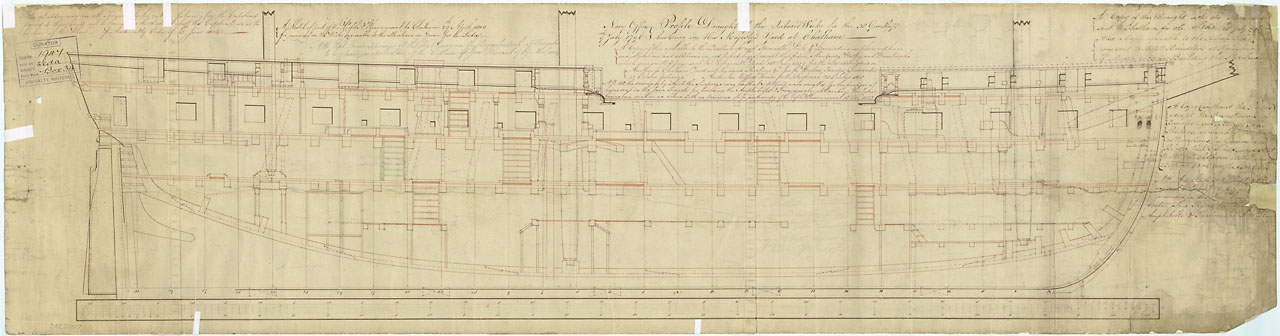
- Leda

History

Great Britain
- Name: HMS Leda
- Ordered: 27 April 1796
- Builder: Chatham Dockyard
- Laid down: 1 May 1799
- Launched: 18 November 1800
- Completed: 19 December 1800
- Commissioned: November 1800
- Honours and awards: Naval General Service Medal with clasp "Egypt"
- Fate: Wrecked 31 January 1808 off West Angle, Milford Haven, Wales, UK

General characteristics
- Class & type: Leda-class frigate
- Tons burthen: 107111/94 (bm)
- Length: Overall: 150 ft 2 in (45.77 m); Keel: 125 ft 4 in (38.20 m)
- Beam: 40 ft 1 in (12.22 m)
- Depth of hold: 12 ft 9 in (3.89 m)
- Sail plan: Full-rigged ship
- Complement: 284 (later 300);
- Armament: Upper deck: 28 × 18-pounder guns; QD: 8 × 9-pounder guns + 6 × 32-pounder carronades; Fc: 2 × 9-pounder guns + 2 × 32-pounder carronades

HMS Leda, launched in 1800, was the lead ship of a successful class of forty-seven British Royal Navy 38-gun sailing frigates. Leda's design was based on the French Hébé, which the British had captured in 1782. (Hébé herself was the name vessel for the French Hébé-class frigates. Hébé, therefore, has the rare distinction of being the model for both a French and a British frigate class.) Leda was wrecked at the mouth of Milford Haven in 1808, Captain Honeyman was exonerated of all blame, as it was a pilot error.

== French Revolutionary Wars ==
Captain George Johnstone Hope commissioned Leda in November 1800. In 1801 he sailed her in the English Channel and to the coast of Egypt.

On 12 March 1801, Leda recaptured the slave ship Bolton, Captain Watson, a 20-gun letter of marque that had sailed from Demerara for Liverpool some six weeks previously in company with Union and Dart. These two vessels were also slave ships and letters of marque, all carrying valuable cargoes of sugar, coffee, indigo and cotton. During the voyage Union started to take on water so her crew transferred to Bolton. Then Bolton and Dart parted company in a gale. Next, Bolton had the misfortune to meet the French privateer Gironde, which was armed with 26 guns and had a crew of 260 men. Gironde captured Bolton in an hour-long fight that killed two passengers and wounded Watson and five men. Although Gironde was damaged, she had suffered no casualties. Bolton was also carrying ivory, a tiger, and a large collection of birds, monkeys, and the like.

Then on 5 April Leda captured the French ship Desiree, of eight men and 70 tons. She was sailing from Bordeaux to Brell with a cargo of wheat. Four days later Leda recaptured the Portuguese ship Cæsar, of 10 men and 100 tons. Cæsar had been sailing from Bristol to Lisbon with a cargo of sundries when the French privateer Laura had captured her.

Lastly, on 1 May, Leda captured the French privateer Jupiter. Jupiter, of 90 tons, was armed with 16 guns and had a crew of 60 men. She was from Morlaix on cruise. On the same day Leda recaptured the Portuguese vessel Tejo. Then on 2 September Leda captured Venturose.

Because Leda served in the navy's Egyptian campaign (8 March to 8 September 1801), her officers and crew qualified for the clasp "Egypt" to the Naval General Service Medal that the Admiralty issued in 1847 to all surviving claimants.

In September 1802 Leda came under the command of Captain John (or James) Hardy.

== Napoleonic Wars ==
Captain Robert Honyman (or Honeyman) recommissioned Leda in August 1803 for the North Sea. he would remain her captain until her loss in 1808. Still, at various times Leda was under the temporary command of Captain Henry Digby in 1804 and Captain John Hartley in February 1805.

In 1803 Leda was in the Channel. When the war with France recommenced, Honeyman was put in charge of a small squadron of gun-brigs off Boulogne. On 18 May Leda and Amelia detained the Dutch ship Phoenix. The next day Leda captured Bodes Lust. (Note: A petty officer's share of the prize money for Bodes Luft was £17 15s 6d; an able seaman's share was £6 0s 6d.)

Five days after that, Leda, Amelia, Raisonable and Gelikheid were in company at the capture of the Dutch ship Twee Vrienden. (Note: A petty officer's share of the prize money was £4 3s 10d; an able seaman's share was 13s 7d. In May 1807 there was a further distribution of prize money for Twee Vrinden and a distribution for Phoenix. A petty officer's share of the prize money for Phoenix was £18 17s 0d; an able seaman's share was £5 7s 6d. For Twee Vrinden the amounts were £4 3s 6d and 13s 6d.)

On 29 September Honyman and his squadron attacked a division of 26 enemy gun boats. The engagement lasted several hours until the gunboats took refuge off the pier in Boulogne. Honyman wanted to have his bomb vessels engage them, but winds and tide were unfavourable. The next day 25 more French gunboats arrived. However, before they could join the division that had arrived the night before, the British were able to drive two on shore where they were wrecked. The British suffered no casualties or material damage though a shell did explode in Leda's hold. Fortunately, this did little damage and caused no casualties.

On 21 October Honyman sighted a convoy of six French sloops, some armed, under the escort of a gun-brig. He sent Harpy and Lark to pursue them but the winds were uncooperative and the squadron was unable to engage. Instead, the hired armed cutter Admiral Mitchell, which had only 35 men and twelve 12-pounder carronades, came up and attacked the convoy. After two and a half hours of cannonading, Admiral Mitchell succeeded in driving one sloop and the brig, which was armed with twelve 32-pounder guns, on the rocks. Admiral Mitchell had one gun dismounted, suffered damage to her mast and rigging, and had five men wounded, two seriously. On 17 November 1803, Leda ran aground off Dungeness, Kent.

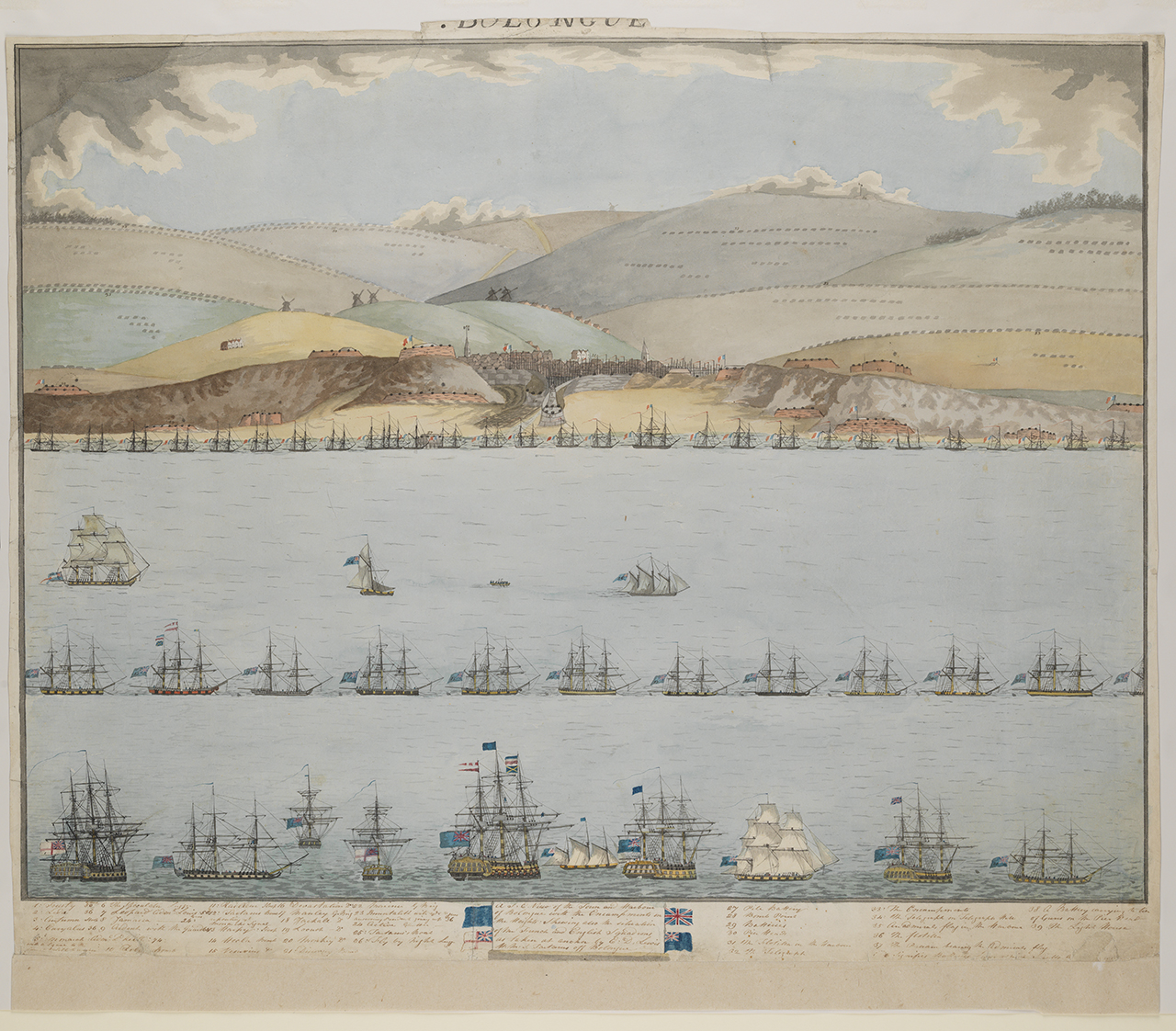
Leda at the attack on Boulogne October 1804

At the end of July 1804, a boarding party under Lieutenant M'Lean took Leda's boats to mount an unsuccessful attack on a French gunvessel in Boulogne Roads. The attackers succeeded in capturing their target, but the strong tide prevented them from retrieving her. Casualties were heavy in the cutting out party and M'Lean was among the dead; in all, only 14 out of the 38 men in the boarding party returned to Leda.

Early in the morning of 24 April 1805, Leda, again under Honyman's command after Hartley's temporary command, sighted twenty-six French vessels rounding Cap Gris Nez. Honyman immediately ordered Fury, Harpy, Railleur, Bruiser, Gallant, Archer, Locust, Tickler, Watchful, Monkey, Firm, and Starling to intercept. After a fight of about two hours, Starling and Locust had captured seven armed schuyts in an action within pistol-shot of the shore batteries on Cap Gris Nez. (Note: A schuyt was a Dutch flat-bottomed sailboat, broad in the beam, with square stern; usually equipped with leeboards to serve for a keel.) The schuyts were all of 25 to 28 tons burthen, and carried in all 117 soldiers and 43 seamen under the command of officers from the 51st. Infantry Regiment. The French convoy had been bound for Ambleteuse from Dunkirk. On the British side the only casualty was one man wounded on Archer. The seven schyuts were:

- Schuyt No. 52, under the command of a Sub-Lieutenant of Infantry Loriol, armed with three 24-pounders;
- Schuyt No. 48, under the command of A. Joron of the 51st the Infantry, armed with two 6-pounders, one 24-pounder and one brass howitzer;
- Schuyt No. 57, under the command of Lieutenant Loriol of 51st Infantry, armed with one 24-pounder and two 6-pounders;
- Schuyt No. 45, an unarmed transport, under the command of Sub-Lieutenant Litner of the 51st Infantry, armed with one 24-pounder, one 12-pounder and one 6-pounder;
- Schuyt No. 3. under the command of Mr. Calder, the senior commander, who left her before the British took possession of her;
- Schuyt No. 54, under the command of Sub-Lieutenant Bragur of the 51st Infantry, armed with one 24-pounder and two 6-pounders;
- Schuyt No. 43, Sub Lieutenant Billa of the 51st Infantry, armed with one 24-pounder and two 6-pounders.

The next day Archer brought in two more schuyts, No. s 44 and 58, each armed with one 24-pounder and two 12-pounders. On 25 April 1805 Railleur towed eight of the French schuyts into the Downs. Starling, which had received a great deal of damage, followed Railleur in.

Leda was one of the escorts to a convoy of transports and EIC vessels that were part of the expedition under General Sir David Baird and Admiral Sir Home Riggs Popham that would in 1806 capture the Dutch Cape Colony. They would carry supplies and troops to the Cape, and then continue on their voyages.

At 3:30 a.m. on 1 November, near Rocas Atoll at 3°51′27″N 33°48′57″W, Leda sighted breakers and fired a gun, the signal to tack, herself barely missing the danger. King George was unable to tack and wrecked. As Britannia was on the point of tacking she ran afoul of Streatham and lost her bowsprit and foretopmast. She then drifted on to the atoll where she lost her rudder and bilged. In the morning Leda was able to rescue the survivors from King George and Comet, Europe, and Varuna sent their boats and were able to rescue about 400 people from Britannia, including Captain Brisk, his crew, and recruits for the EIC's armies.

The British fleet, including Leda, arrived in Table Bay on 5 January 1806 and anchored off Robben Island. Leda supported the landing of the troops.

On 6 January 1807 Leda was in company with Pheasant and Daphne at the capture of Ann, Denning, master. Leda shared in the capture of the Rolla on 21 February. On 4 March she was at Table Bay and in sight when Diadem captured the French frigate Volontaire and the two transports that Volontaire was escorting, which turned out to be two British transports that the frigate had captured in the Bay of Biscay, together with the British troops on board. On 19 March the squadron captured the General Izidro.

In June 1810 the prize money for the capture of the Cape of Good Hope was payable. (Note: A naval captain's share, i.e., the share for Captain Honyman, was £238 8s 5 3/4d; for a seaman the proceeds were £1 13s 10d.) Then in July 1810 there was further distribution of money for the capture of Volontaire and Rolla. (Note: A petty officer's share of the prize money for Volontaire was £6 5s 0 1/2d; an able seaman's share was £1 11s 6d. For Rolla the amounts were 15s 0 1/2d and 3s 10d.) In December 1810 prize money for General Izidro was payable. (Note: A first-class share, that of a naval captain, was £255 16s 10 1/2d; a fifth-class share, that of a seaman, was worth 15s 9 1/4d.)

Leda then accompanied Home Popham across the Atlantic for his expedition to the River Plate. On 9 September 1806 Leda pursued a brigantine on her way to Montevideo until the brigantine's crew beached her. Leda then sent her boats to retrieve or destroy the brigantine. However, when the boarding party reached the brigantine they discovered that her crew had already abandoned her. They also found that she was unarmed, though pierced for 14 guns. Because of the heavy seas the boarding party could not retrieve the brigantine, or even burn her. Instead they simply set her adrift among the breakers. During the operation small arms fire from the shore wounded four men.

Leda remained in South America until the final British evacuation in about September 1807. On 22 August she was in sight, together with a number of other warships, when Procris captured Minerva. Leda then returned to Sheerness and served in the Channel.

At eight o'clock on the morning of 4 December, some 4 leagues (19 km) off Cap de Caux, Leda sighted a privateer lugger making for the French coast, as well as a brig that appeared to be her prize. The brig ran for Havre de Grace but the lugger sailed in another direction as Leda pursued her. After six hours Leda succeeded in capturing the lugger, which turned out to be the brand new vessel Adolphe, under the command of Nicholas Famenter. Adolphe was armed with ten 18-pound carronades, four 4-pounder guns, two 2-pounder guns and two swivel guns. She was eight days out of Boulogne. She had only 25 men on board as she had already put another 45 men of her crew on prizes. She ran ashore on the Bemberg Ledge and it was unlikely she would be gotten off.

== Loss ==
On 31 January 1808, Leda was caught in a gale that did much damage to the ship. Honeyman decided to try to take refuge at Milford Haven but she was wrecked at the mouth of the harbour. The quarantine master for the port came aboard Leda to urge her abandonment. The entire crew was able to get off safely.

A court martial held on board HMS Salvador del Mundo in the Hamoaze acquitted Honeyman and his crew of all blame. It found that the pilot, James Garretty, had laid a wrong course after mistaking Thorn Island for the Stack Rocks, a mistake that was due to the bad weather and poor visibility.
