= Albert Dock =

Albert Dock may refer to:

- Albert Dock, Hull, in Kingston upon Hull, England
- Royal Albert Dock, Liverpool, a dock and warehouse system in Liverpool, England
- Royal Albert Dock, London, in the Docklands area of east London, England
- Albert Dock Seamen's Hospital, a London hospital for ex members of the merchant navy
