= Keppel Street =

Street in London

Coordinates: 51.52054°N 0.12993°W

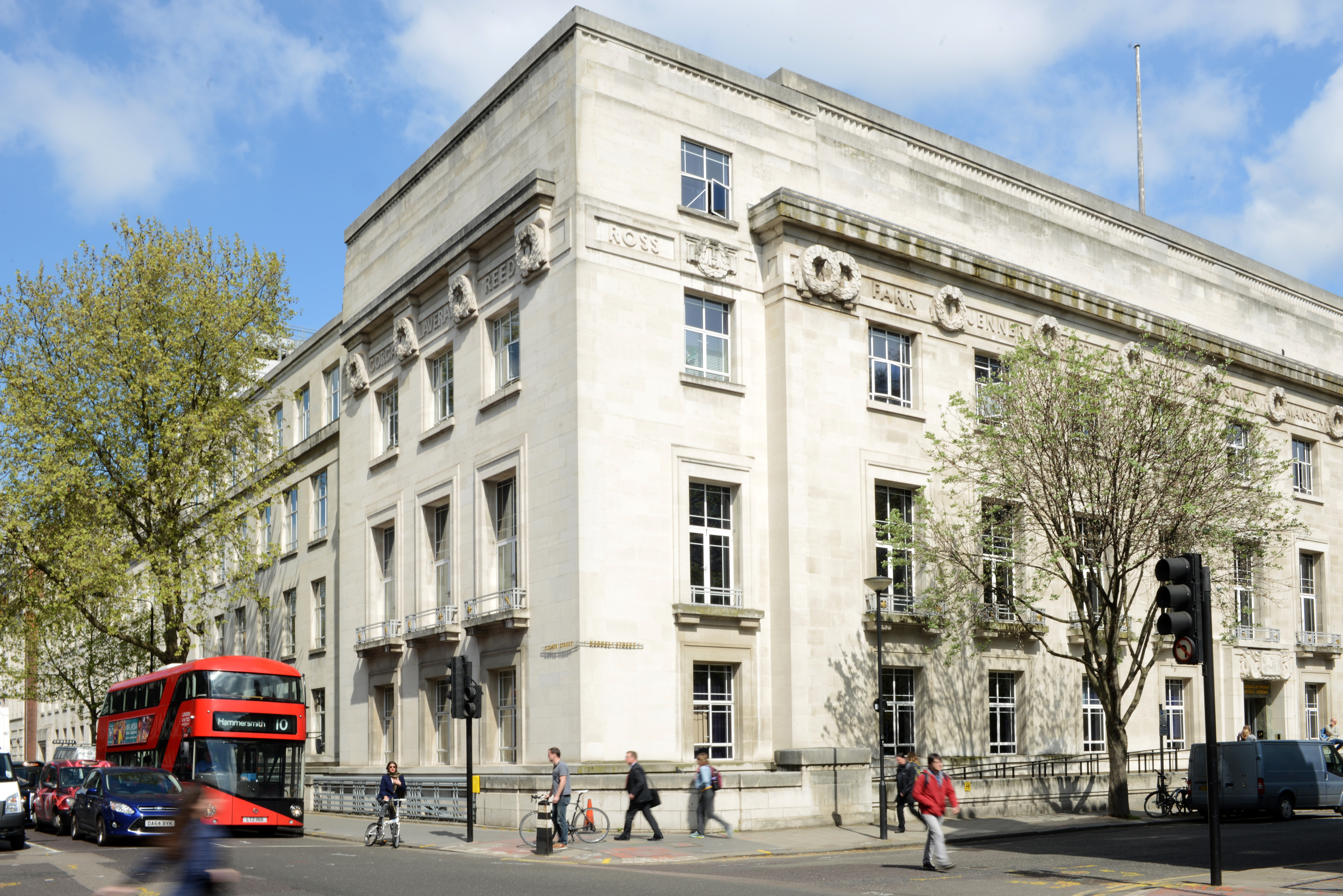
The London School of Hygiene & Tropical Medicine, at the corner of Keppel Street and Gower Street

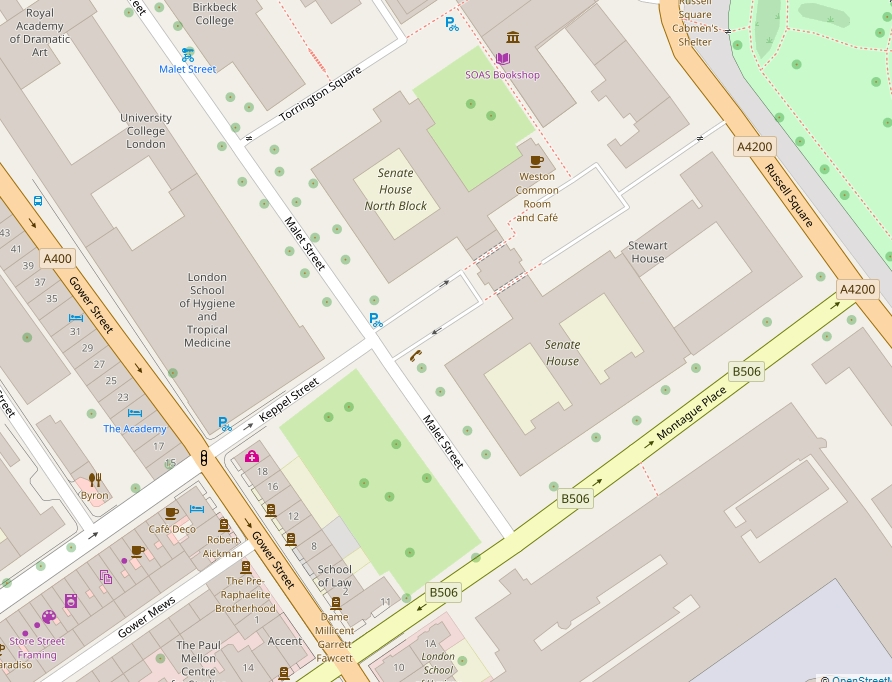
Map of Keppel Street (centre, diagonal)

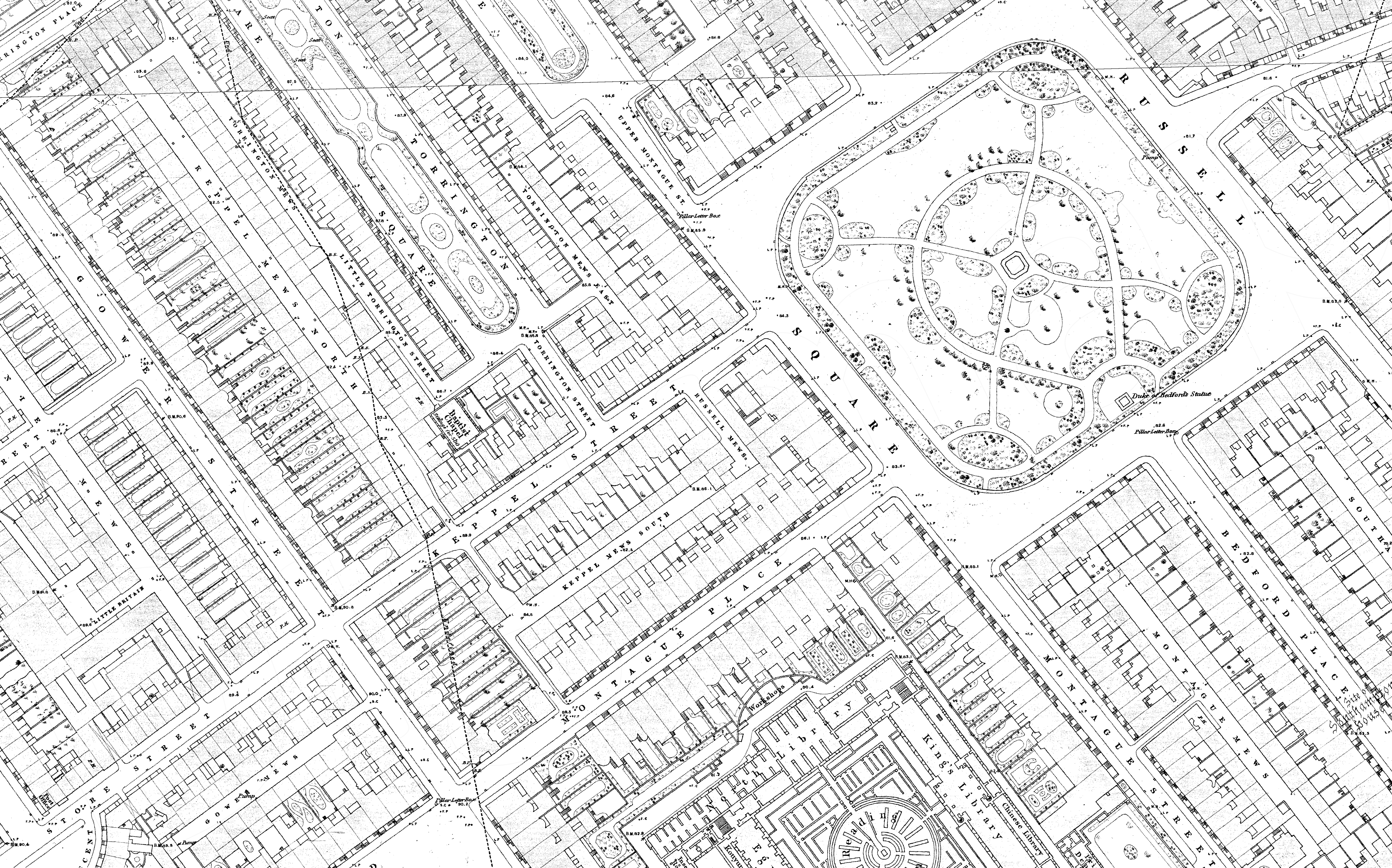
Keppel Street and Russell Square on an 1870s Ordnance Survey map

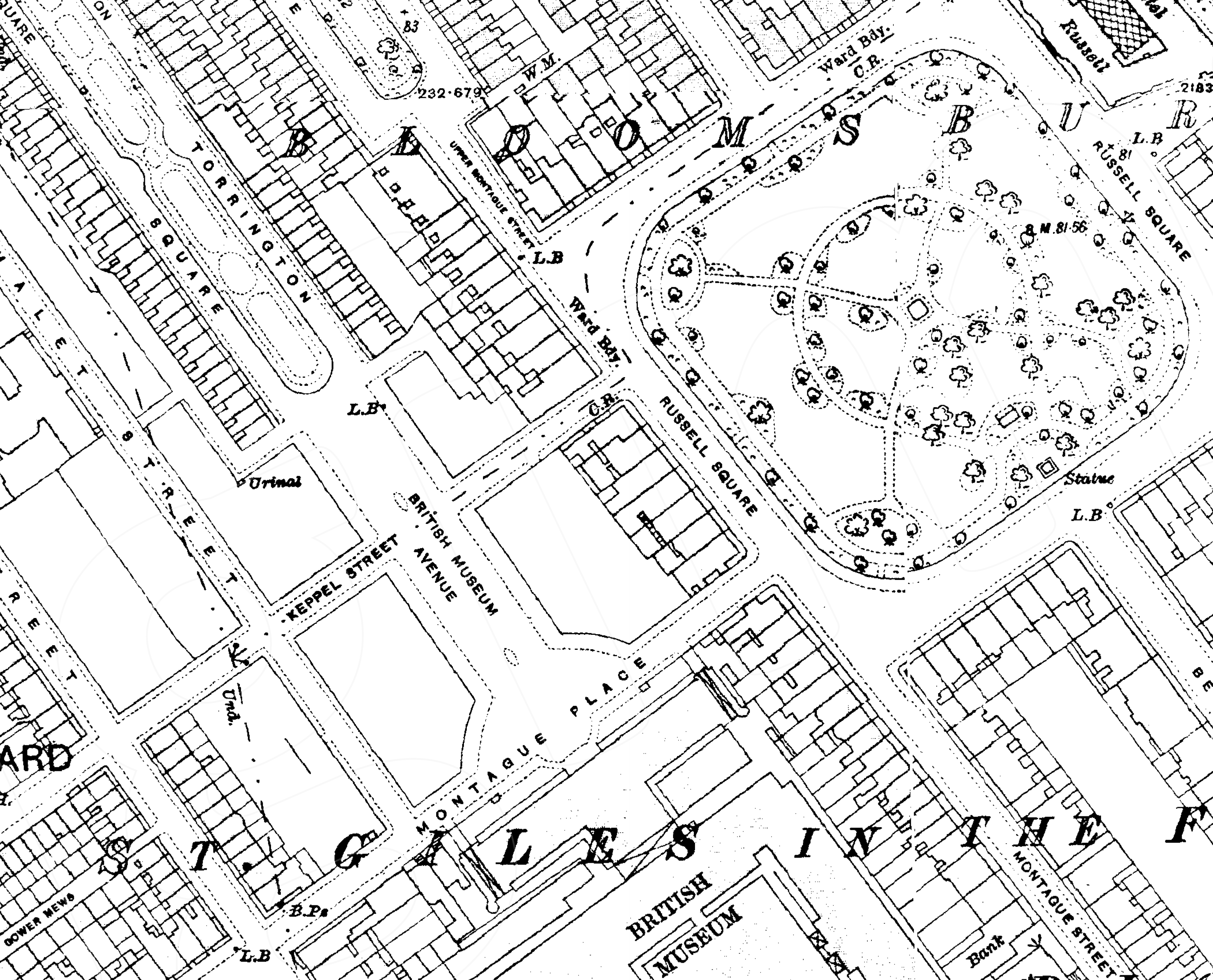
Keppel Street in the 1910s on an Ordnance Survey map showing British Museum Avenue

Keppel Street is a street in the London Borough of Camden that runs from the junction of Store Street and Gower Street in the west to Malet Street in the east. Before the construction of Senate House, it continued on to join Russell Square.

== History ==
The street originally continued farther east to join Russell Square. It was joined on the north side by Torrington Street and Keppel Mews North, and on the south side by Russell Mews and the entrance to Keppel Mews South. It contained a chapel for Anabaptists.

British Museum Avenue was created in the early twentieth century, dividing the street, and replacing Torrington Street, Russell Mews and Keppel Mews South. British Museum Avenue was itself built over in the early 1930s when Senate House and other University of London buildings were constructed on the former eastern end of Keppel Street.

== Buildings ==
The main entrance to the London School of Hygiene & Tropical Medicine is on the north side of Keppel Street. Malet Street Gardens is on the south side of the street.

The former Royal Institute of Chemistry building, now with a street address of 30 Russell Square, is at what was the eastern end of the street on the north side. A figure of Joseph Priestley by Gilbert Bayes may be seen above the doorway in the former Keppel Street.

== Gallery ==
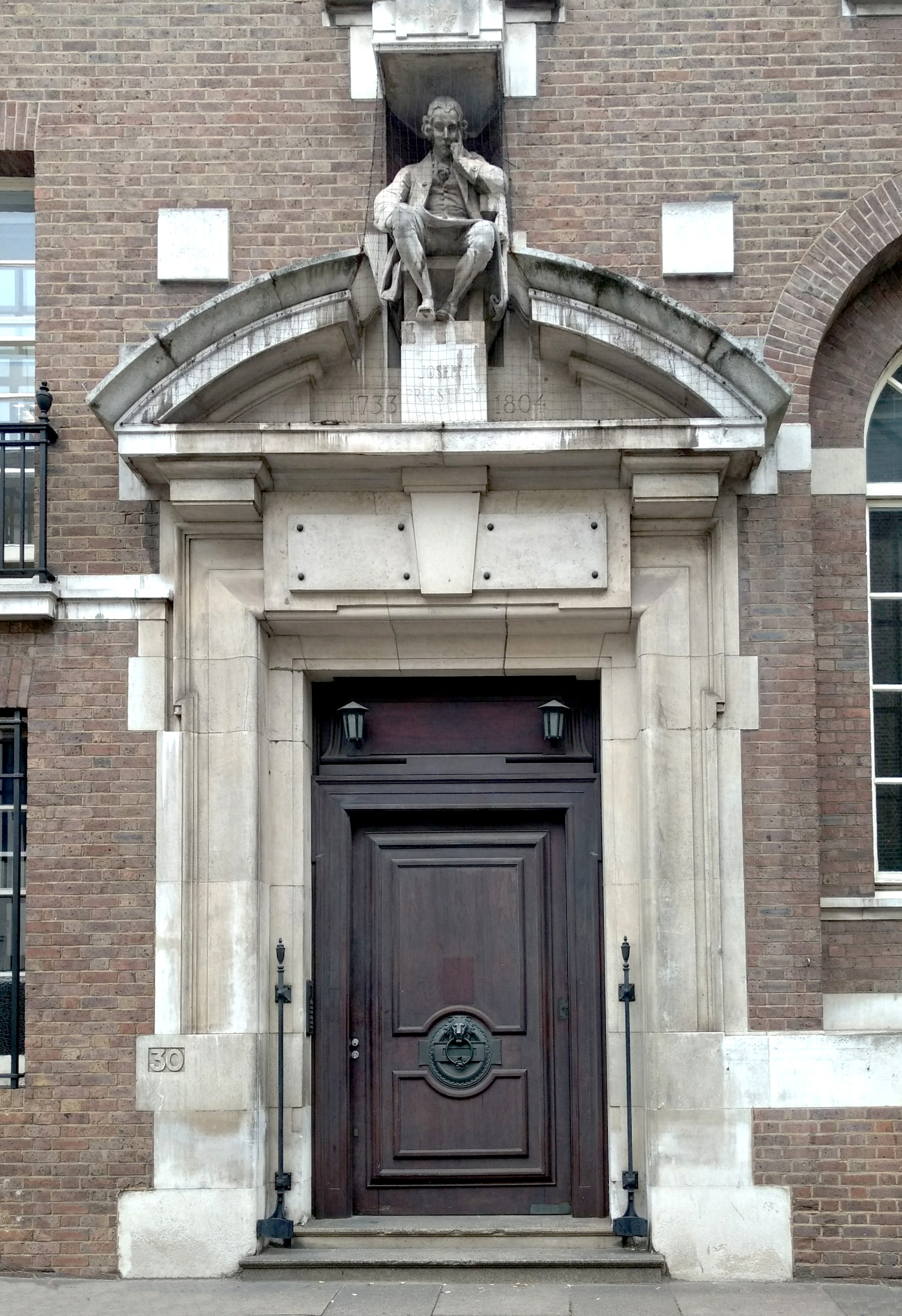
Figure of Joseph Priestley by Gilbert Bayes above the doorway of the former Royal Institute of Chemistry

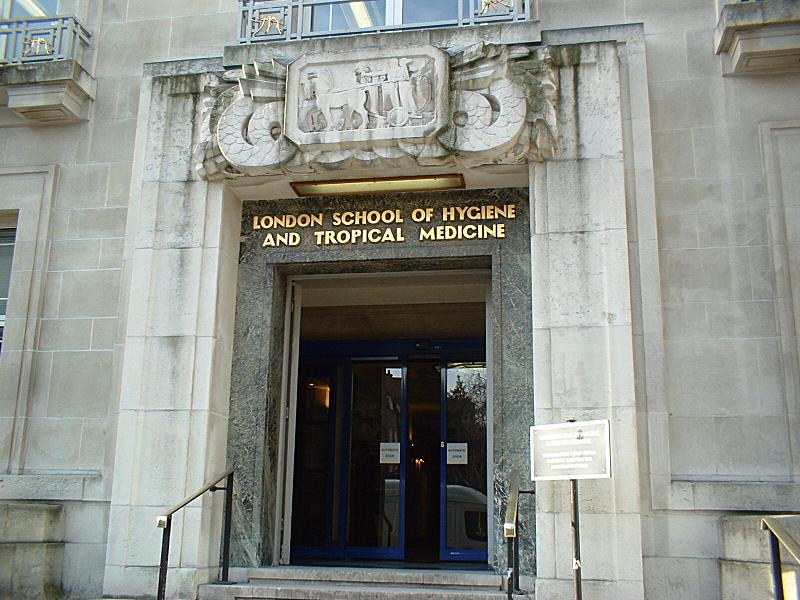
London School of Hygiene and Tropical Medicine entrance on Keppel Street

== Popular Literature ==
Charlotte and Thomas Pitt, the main characters in Anne Perry's book series, lived in Keppel Street for several decades during the victorian era.
