= Centre for History in Public Health, London School of Hygiene and Tropical Medicine =

Academic Institution based in London

Coordinates: 51.5253°N 0.1267°W

Centre for History in Public Policy, London School of Hygiene & Tropical Medicine
- Established: 2003
- Director: Professor Virginia Berridge
- Location: 15-17 Tavistock Place, London WC1H 9SH, UK
- Website: http://history.lshtm.ac.uk/

The Centre for History in Public Health (CHiPH) is an academic research centre at the London School of Hygiene & Tropical Medicine (LSHTM), University of London. It specializes in historical research into public health and health services, and advocates the use of history within public health policy making.

== History and purpose ==
The Centre began as the "AIDS Social History Programme" in 1988, funded by the Nuffield Provincial Hospitals Trust. From 1990 onwards, the programme's historical work began to expand, and from 1997 the Wellcome Trust funded "Science Speaks to Policy", a project programme drawing on the AIDS work's concerns. The School's 'History Group' was awarded Centre status in 2002 and became the Centre for History in Public Health in 2003, with members of other departments of the School on its management committee.

Today, the Centre is a rare example of historians working in medical or public health settings. It carries out research in order to both contribute to the historical discipline, and develop historical understanding in public health policy making. Its emphasis on recent health policy is relatively unusual within the field of history of medicine, which has recently tended to shift towards social and cultural history. The Director of the Centre is Professor Virginia Berridge.

== Research ==
The Centre's research focus is largely on public health from the mid to late twentieth century and health services in the inter- and post-war period. Its research programme includes:

- The recent history of public health at local, national and international levels
- Substance use history: drugs, alcohol, smoking
- Health services in the twentieth century
- Research resource development
- Witness seminars
- History and policy

== Teaching, public and policy engagement ==
As well as supervising PhD students in medical history, the CHiPH runs a History and Health module at Masters level. This offers an introductory survey of the history of public health and health services in the UK and internationally, providing training in competencies necessary for the UK Faculty of Public Health examinations.

The Centre also runs a regular programme of public and policy engagement activities funded by the Wellcome Trust. These include seminars, conferences, and workshops, witness seminars, film screenings, and history walks of Bloomsbury.

== Funding ==
The Centre is the recipient of a five-year infrastructure award (known as an 'enhancement award') from the Wellcome Trust for the period 2009-2014, which supports its core interests in public health, health services and health consumerism. The Centre has also received additional funding through external research grants from organisations including the Medical Research Council and National Institute for Clinical Excellence.

== Networks and collaborations ==
The Centre for History in Public Health has strong ties with the European Association for the History of Medicine and Health (EAHMH), which aims to foster research and the international exchange of views on issues concerning health and medicine in Europe and their connections with the extra-European world. The Centre is also a partner organization of History and Policy, a project based at the Institute of Contemporary British History at King's College, London, which brings historians, policy makers and the media together to increase the influence of historical research on current policy.

== See also ==
- Centre for the History of Science and Technology, University of Manchester
- Centre for the History of Science, Technology and Medicine, Imperial College, London
- UCL Centre for the History of Medicine
- Medical humanities
