= Seafarers Hospital Society =

British charity

Coordinates: 51°28′54″N 0°0′31″W

The Seafarers Hospital Society, formerly the Seamen's Hospital Society, is a charity for people currently or previously employed by the British Merchant Navy and fishing fleets, and their families. It was established in 1821.

== Current activities ==
The Dreadnought Seamen's Hospital continues to the present day under the NHS as the 'Dreadnought Unit' at St Thomas's Hospital and the dedicated Hospital for Tropical Diseases, part of the University College Hospitals London NHS Trust.

The society currently part-funds the Seafarers' Advice and Information Line, a national advice service operated by the Greenwich Citizens Advice Bureau. In addition it provides funds to nursing and residential care units for seafarers, and helps those in need by providing hardship grants.

== History ==
=== Formation of the Society ===
The Society was established as the Seamen's Hospital Society on 8 March 1821 as the successor of the Committee for the Relief of Distressed (Destitute) Seamen. It was founded by philanthropists who wished to improve the welfare of seafarers, and supporters included William Wilberforce and Zachary Macaulay. Early meetings were held at The City of London Tavern in Bishopsgate.

In 1832, the ship owner John Lydekker died and left nearly £60,000 in his Will to the Society. The Society used the funds to successfully submit an Act of Incorporation to Parliament in 1833, which secured the Society's legal status.

=== The HMS Dreadnought hospital ships ===
The Society decided to create a hospital for the thousands of sick and unemployed seamen. It was decided to base the hospital within a ship because it was thought that the seamen would respond better to medical treatment at sea rather than on land.

The Royal Navy initially loaned HMS Grampus to be used as the hospital. This ship soon became too small for the hospital's activities so it moved to HMS Dreadnought in 1831. In 1857, the hospital again moved to HMS Caledonia, which was renamed Dreadnought. These ships were moored along the River Thames at Greenwich. In 1870, the hospital was moved to land: with permission from the Admiralty, it came to occupy part of Greenwich Hospital and became known as the Dreadnought Hospital.

During the almost 50 years the Society operated the hospital ships, the common diseases the encountered included epidemic typhus, dysentery, enteric fever, cholera, tuberculosis, syphilis and gonorrhoea. While the prevalence of scurvy within the Royal Navy was diminishing in the 19th century, it still remained common in the Merchant Navy. Professor G.C. Cook has argued that it was through the campaigning of Harry Leach, a Resident Medical Officer on the Dreadnought, that scurvy rates finally began to decline in the Merchant Navy. Other medical staff aboard the Dreadnought included George Budd and George Busk.

=== Other hospitals ===
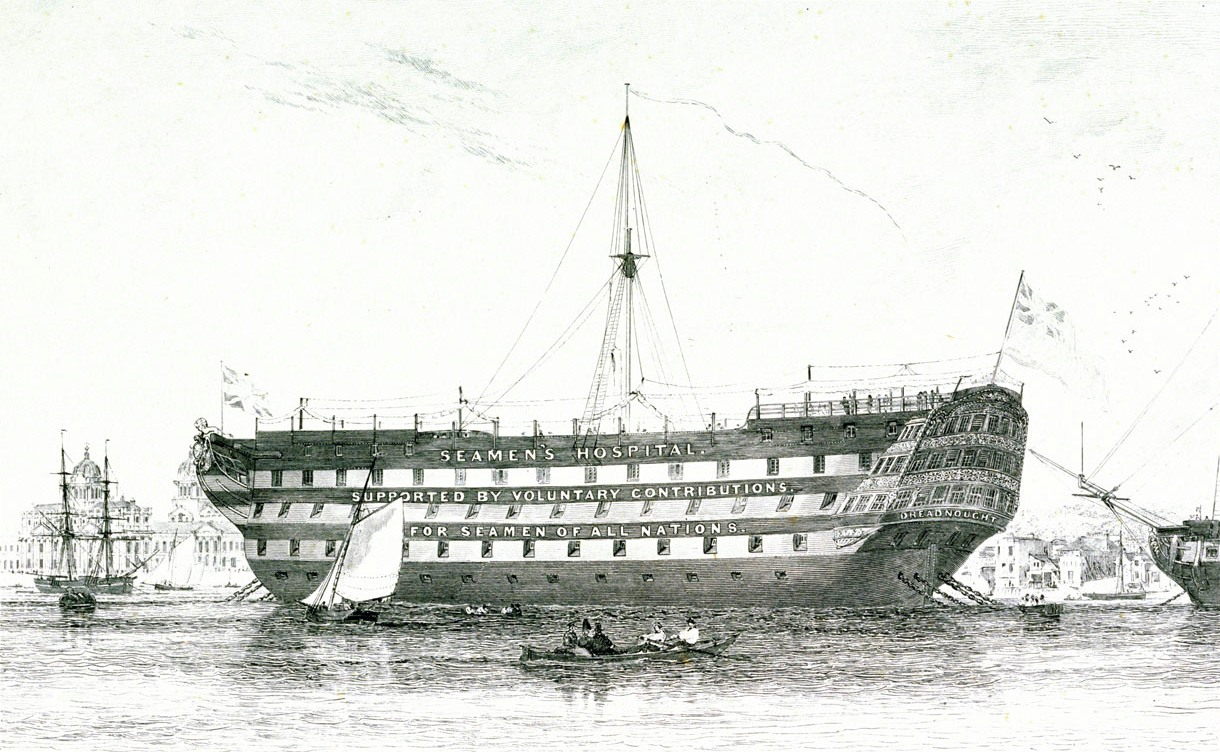
HMS Dreadnought, a lazaretto (quarantine ship) at Milford on Sea on the Hampshire coast from 1827, and second of the society's ships from 1831

The Albert Dock Seamen's Hospital was opened in 1890 as a branch of the Dreadnought Seamen's Hospital, Greenwich. The London School of Tropical Medicine was established here in October 1899, by Sir Patrick Manson, and remained there until moving to Euston in February 1920.

In 1919 the dedicated Hospital for Tropical Diseases (HTD) was set up by the Seamen's Hospital Society in the Endsleigh Palace Hotel, 25 Gordon Street (near Euston Square in central London). This was evacuated at the start of the Second World War back to the Dreadnought Hospital in Greenwich. The HTD moved temporarily to 23 Devonshire Street in 1947, before being reestablished under the newly formed NHS in 1951 at the site of the St Pancras Hospital in Camden. The HTD moved again in 1998 to new purpose-built premises within part of the University College Hospitals London NHS Trust.

Meanwhile, the in-patient Dreadnought Seamen's Hospital continued at Greenwich until its closure in 1986, with special services for seamen and their families then provided by the 'Dreadnought Unit' at St Thomas's Hospital in Lambeth. This originally consisted of two 28-bed 'Dreadnought wards', but nowadays Dreadnought patients are treated according to clinical need and so are placed in the ward most suitable for their medical condition. Since the formation of the NHS, the Dreadnought Hospital/Unit has been funded by central government with money separate from other NHS trust funds.

The Society opened the Angas Convalescent Home in Cudham, Kent, in 1918. The building it occupied was previously the property of Mrs. L.G. Angas until she donated to the Society. The Home opened with 30 beds but it was extended so there was enough space to host 42 patients by 1924. In 1930, it was reported that 472 patients had been treated there that year. The Home also held annual garden fête.

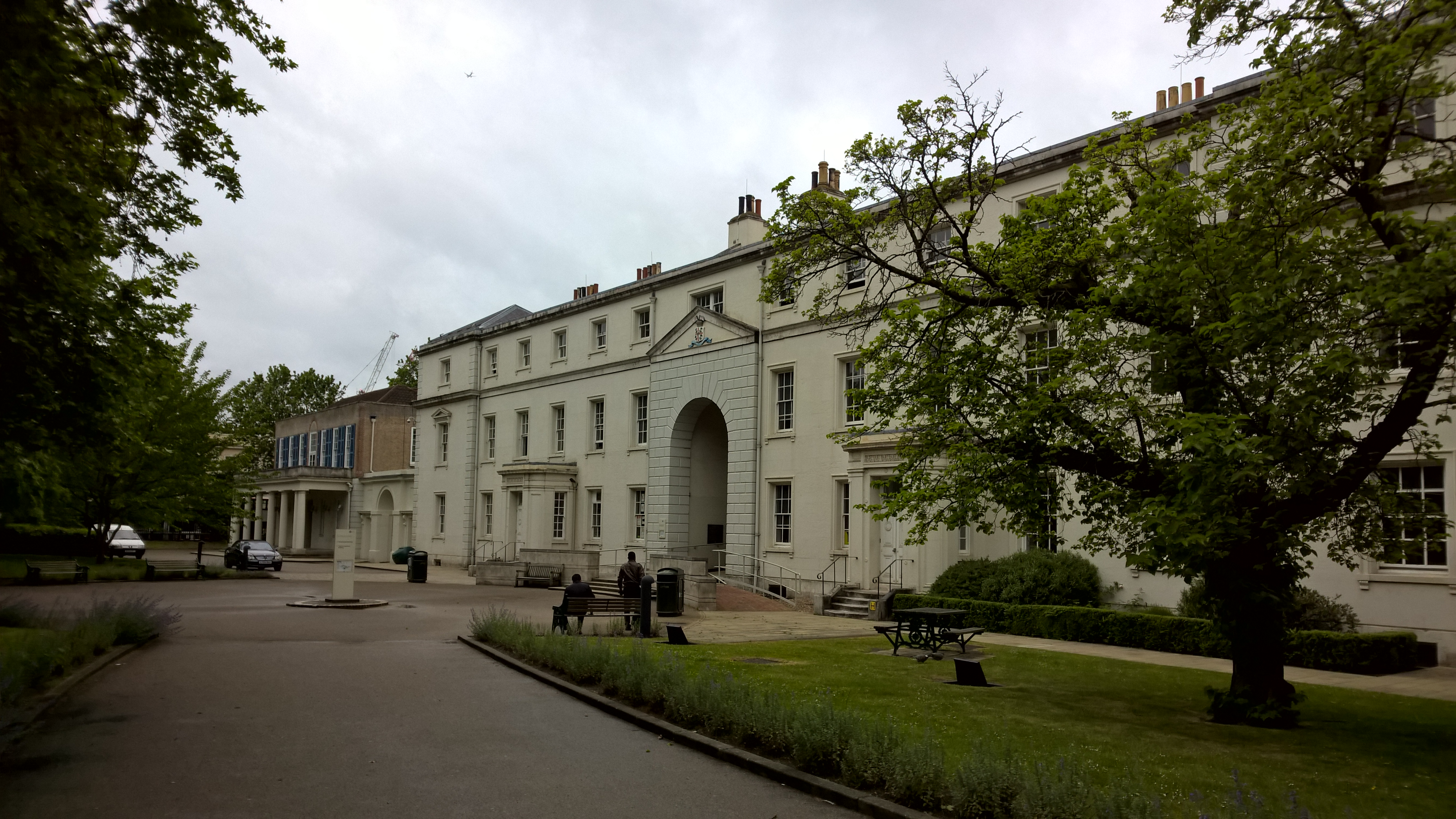
Former Dreadnought Seamen's Hospital building at Greenwich, built in 1763 as the Royal Hospital's Infirmary

The former hospital building is now being redeveloped to become a new Students' Union & study space as part of the University of Greenwich.

=== Notable staff ===
- Christina Graham Knight OBE (1862–1959), Matron, 1898-1919. Knight trained at The London Hospital under Eva Luckes between 1891 and 1893. Knight became sister at the Seamen's Hospital, Royal Albert Dock, Greenwich in 1896, and was promoted to matron in 1898.

== See also ==
- Healthcare in London
- Royal Hamadryad Hospital, a hospital ship and later a seamen's hospital in Cardiff
