= HMS Hamadryad (1823) =

Frigate of the Royal Navy

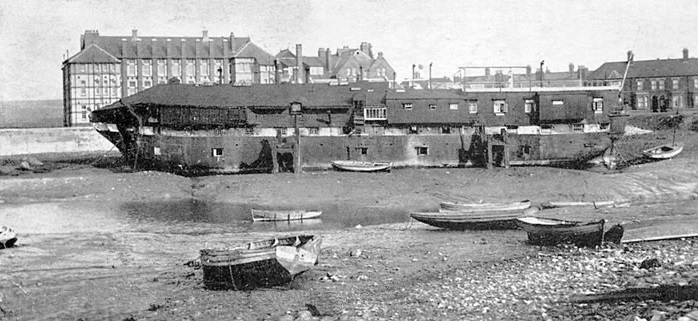
- Hamadryad as a hospital ship in Cardiff Docks with the almost complete Royal Hamadryad Hospital behind it (c. 1904)

History

United Kingdom
- Name: Hamadryad
- Operator: Royal Navy
- Ordered: 25 April 1817
- Builder: Pembroke Dockyard
- Laid down: September 1819
- Launched: 25 July 1823
- Completed: 23 August 1823 at Plymouth Dockyard
- Fate: Sold 11 July 1905

General characteristics
- Class & type: Modified Leda-class frigate
- Tons burthen: 1082 bm
- Length: 150 ft 9.25 in (46.0 m) (gundeck); 127 ft 1 in (38.7 m) (keel)
- Beam: 40 ft 4 in (12.3 m)
- Depth of hold: 12 ft 9 in (3.9 m)
- Sail plan: Full-rigged ship
- Complement: 300
- Armament: Upper deck: Twenty-eight 18-pounder guns; Forecastle: Two 9-pounder guns and two 32-pounder carronades; Quarter deck: Eight 9-pounder guns and six 32-pounder carronades

HMS Hamadryad was a 46-gun fifth-rate Modified Leda-class frigate of the Royal Navy. She was launched in 1823 and later became a hospital ship in Cardiff, Wales.

== History ==
She was ordered on 25 April 1817 at Pembroke Dockyard in Pembrokeshire, where her keel was laid down in September 1819. She was launched on 25 July 1823, and sailed round on 8 August to Plymouth Dockyard to be completed.

=== Hospital ship ===
In February 1866 she was designated for handing over to Messrs. Marshall, the shipbreakers, to be taken to pieces, but instead on 9 March 1866 it was decided to lend her as a floating hospital for sick seamen in Cardiff. She was towed across from Devonport and opened as a hospital ship in Cardiff Docks in November 1866. By the 1880s, 500 in-patients were being treated per year.

Finally in 1900, she was returned to naval control and transferred to Portsmouth, where she was sold for breaking up on 11 July 1905.

A bricks and mortar hospital, named the Royal Hamadryad Hospital, was opened in Cardiff Docks in 1905.

The site of her mooring is now a Welsh Medium Primary School (opened January 2019), taking its name (Ysgol Hamadryad).

Another redundant Leda-class frigate, HMS Thisbe, was also moored in Cardiff and used as a floating church by the Missions to Seamen on from 1863 to 1891.
