= Royal Hamadryad Hospital =

Former hospital in Cardiff, Wales

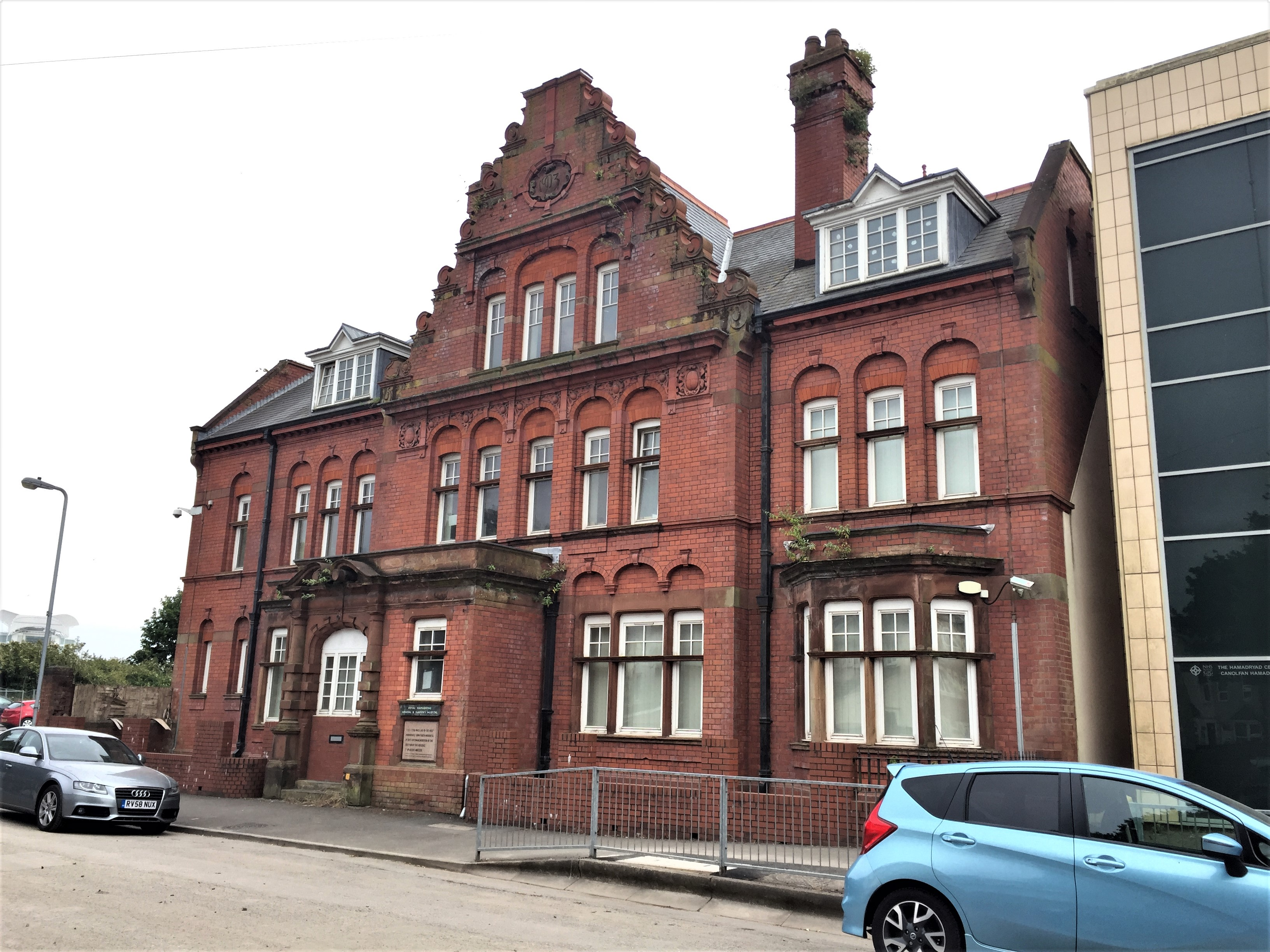
- The Hamadryad Centre, formerly the Royal Hamadryad Hospital, Cardiff

- Shown in Cardiff

Geography
- Location: Cardiff, Wales, United Kingdom
- Coordinates: 51.4624°N 3.1746°W

Organisation
- Care system: Public NHS
- Type: Specialist

Services
- Speciality: Psychiatric hospital

History
- Founded: 1866
- Closed: 2002

Links
- Lists: Hospitals in Wales

The Royal Hamadryad Hospital was a seamen's hospital and later a psychiatric hospital in the docklands area of Cardiff, Wales. It had replaced a hospital ship, the former HMS Hamadryad, in 1905. After it closed in 2002 the site was redeveloped for residential use.

== History ==
=== Hospital ship ===
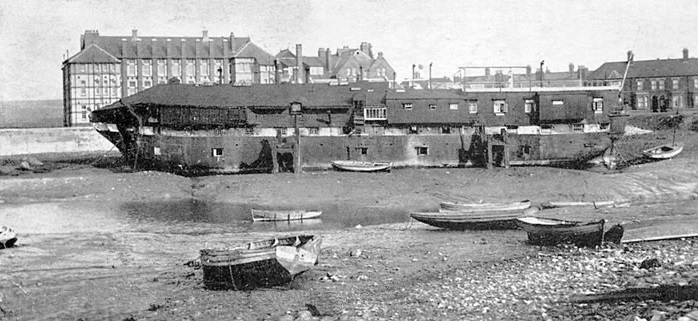
Hospital ship in front of the new hospital building (1904–1905)

In 1866 a 43-year-old frigate, HMS Hamadryad, was towed from Dartmouth to Cardiff and fitted out as a hospital ship at a cost of £2,791. The town's Medical Officer of Health, Dr Henry Paine, had identified the need for a seamen's hospital because of the many diseases that were brought to the docks by sailors from overseas. A piece of waste ground in Cardiff Docks known as Rat Island was donated by the Marquis of Bute and the hospital ship opened for patients in November 1866. In its first year it admitted 400 patients and the free treatment was funded by a levy of two shillings per hundred tons of shipping at Cardiff Docks. The hospital ship was to remain at this site until 1905, when a permanent hospital was opened. Hamadryad was refloated and towed away to be scrapped.

=== Permanent facility ===
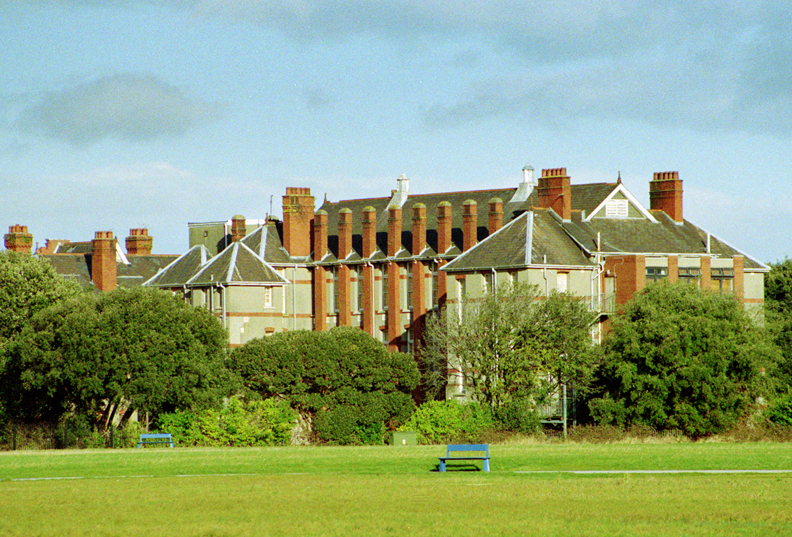
Royal Hamadryad Hospital, rear view (2007)

To mark the Diamond Jubilee of Queen Victoria in 1897, a decision was made to build a permanent bricks-and-mortar seamen's hospital close to the site of the hospital ship. By that time 10,000 seamen (in-patients and out-patients) were being treated each year. The Marquis of Bute, on his death in 1900, bequeathed £20,000 towards the cost of the new building and this was augmented by additional subscriptions of £12,000 and the proceeds of a bazaar, which raised £4,400. A brand new hospital building was constructed in red brick, stone and terracotta immediately to the west of the ship site, designed by E.W.M. Corbett, the architect of the Marquis of Bute's estates. The architectural historian John Newman described the design as "An ebullient performance in [Corbett's] favourite Queen-Anne-cum-Jacobean style". The foundation stone was laid on 7 August 1902 by the 4th Marquess of Bute, son of the testator. Named the Royal Hamadryad Hospital, the new building was opened by the Marquess on 29 June 1905.

The hospital had 54 beds, electric lighting and x-ray facilities. It remained a seamen's hospital (one of only two in Britain offering free treatment exclusively to seafarers) until 1948. Following the formation of the National Health Service it became a general hospital and then a psychiatric facility.

After the remaining 30 mental health patients had been transferred to the newly-opened St David's Hospital in Canton, the hospital was finally closed in 2002.

=== Redevelopment ===
Some of the buildings on the site remain in use as a mental health day care centre. Planning approval has been agreed for housing to be built on the site of the old hospital. In 2015 a planning application for an apartment block with affordable homes was recommended for approval by Cardiff Council planning committee. Ysgol Hamadryad, a Welsh-medium primary school, was scheduled to move to the site in 2017, but moved to a new building on the site in January 2019.

== See also ==
- Seamen's Hospital Society, which operated hospital ships in Deptford, London.
  - Albert Dock Seamen's Hospital, operated by the Seamen's Hospital Society
