= Albert Dock Seamen's Hospital =

- Seamen's Hospital Society
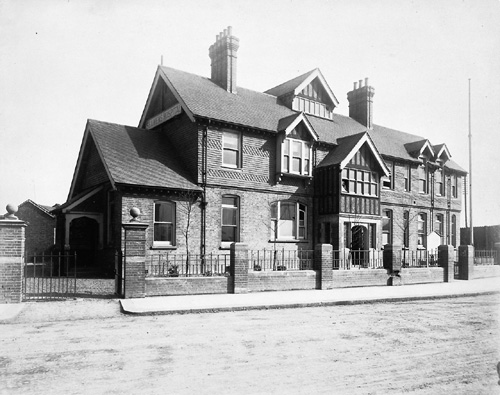
- Seamen's Hospital

- Location within Greenwich

Geography
- Location: Greenwich Hospital site then Euston site, London, England, United Kingdom
- Coordinates: 51°30′43″N 0°02′16″E

Organisation
- Care system: NHS England
- Type: General

Services
- Emergency department: No Accident & Emergency

History
- Founded: 1890
- Closed: 1993

Links
- Lists: Hospitals in England

The Albert Dock Seamen's Hospital was a hospital provided by the Seamen's Hospital Society for the care of ex-members of the Merchant navy, the fishing fleets and their dependents.

== History ==
It was opened in 1890 as a branch of the Dreadnought Seamen's Hospital, Greenwich. The London School of Tropical Medicine was established here in October 1899, by Sir Patrick Manson with assistance from the British Secretary of State for the Colonies (Joseph Chamberlain). Together with the Hospital for Tropical Diseases they moved to Euston in February 1920.

The Hospital was relocated to a new site on nearby Alnwick Road (east of Felsted Road) in 1937-1938 and became part of Newham Health District under the City and East London Area Health Authority (Teaching) in 1974 and was converted from acute to orthopaedic use. It came under the direct control of Newham Health Authority in 1981 and subsequently became a homeward bound mental handicap unit which closed in 1993. The hospital buildings were also demolished in 1993 except for one range which retains its 1930s brown brick elevations and central rendered pediment, now converted to residential use.

== See also ==
- Royal Albert Dock
- Royal Hamadryad Hospital
