= UK Public Health Rapid Support Team =

UK Public Health Rapid Support Team (UK_PHRST) is a team out of the London School of Hygiene and Tropical Medicine which responds to disease outbreaks in low and middle income countries. It is funded by the UK government via the Department of Health and Social Care. University College London and Oxford University are academic partners.

The Director of UK-PHRST is Dr Ed Newman.
