= Hospital for Tropical Diseases =

Coordinates: 51°31′22.05″N 00°08′8.06″W

- University College London Hospitals NHS Foundation Trust
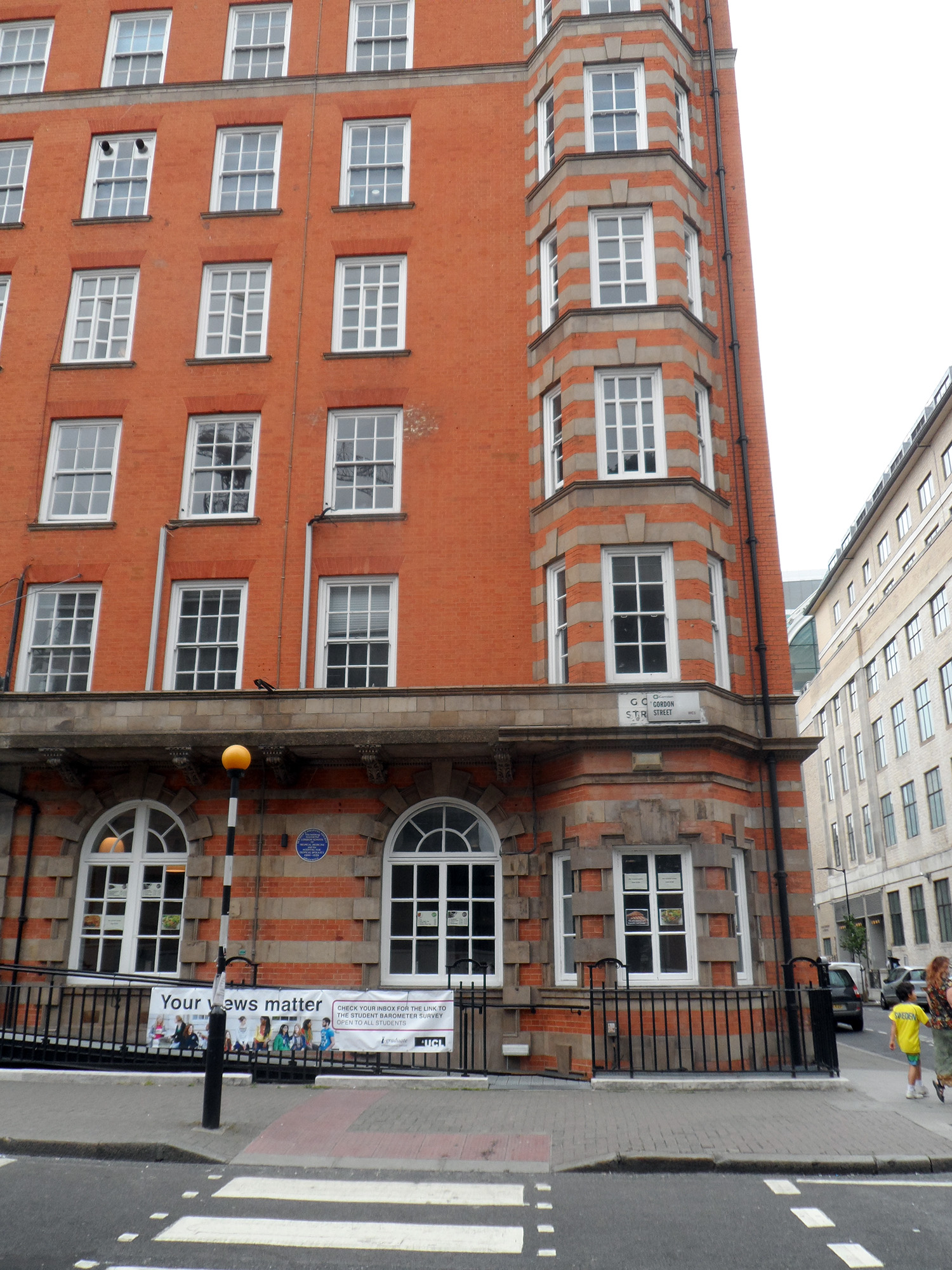
- The original site at 25 Gordon Street in London

- Shown in Camden

Geography
- Location: London, WC1, United Kingdom

Organisation
- Care system: NHS England
- Type: Teaching
- Affiliated university: University College London; London School of Hygiene & Tropical Medicine

History
- Founded: 1821

Links
- Website: University College London Hospitals NHS Foundation Trust, The Hospital for Tropical Diseases
- Lists: Hospitals in the United Kingdom

The Hospital for Tropical Diseases (HTD) is a specialist tropical disease hospital located in London, United Kingdom. It is part of the University College London Hospitals NHS Foundation Trust and is closely associated with University College London and the London School of Hygiene & Tropical Medicine. It is the only NHS hospital dedicated to the prevention, diagnosis and treatment of tropical diseases and travel-related infections. It employs specialists in major tropical diseases including malaria, leprosy and tuberculosis. It also provides an infectious disease treatment service for University College Hospital.

== History ==
The hospital's origins lie in a meeting of the Seaman's Hospital Society on 8 March 1821 at which it was decided to establish a floating hospital for injured seamen. The hospital moved onto dry land as the Dreadnought Seamen's Hospital in 1870 under the management of the Greenwich Hospital. Patrick Manson became physician to the Society in 1892 and promoted an interest in tropical diseases; he has been called the "father of tropical medicine".

In 1920, the Dreadnought Seaman's Society provided funds to allow the establishment of a Hospital for Tropical Diseases, initially based at 25 Gordon Street in London, but evacuated to Greenwich in 1939.

After the Second World War the hospital moved to temporary premises in Devonshire Street in 1947 and, after joining the National Health Service in 1948, it moved to more permanent premises at St Pancras Hospital which were opened by the Duchess of Kent in May 1951. The hospital moved to new facilities at Capper Street which were opened by Anne, Princess Royal in June 1999, and to the new University College Hospital Tower in Euston Road in July 2004.

== See also ==
- Healthcare in London
- List of hospitals in England
- Liverpool School of Tropical Medicine
- Royal Society of Tropical Medicine and Hygiene
