= Michael T. Wright (curator) =

English museum curator (born 1948)

- Gearing layout proposed by Michael Wright for planetary indication on the Antikythera mechanism.
- Born: 16 June 1948 (age 78); London, England
- Education: University of Oxford; University of London
- Scientific career
- Fields: Mechanical engineering, history of science
- Workplaces: Science Museum, London; Imperial College, London
- Website: www.mtwright.co.uk at the Wayback Machine (archived August 14, 2018)

Michael T. Wright, FSA (born 16 June 1948) is a former curator of mechanical engineering at the Science Museum and later at Imperial College in London, England. He is known for his analysis of the original fragments of the Antikythera mechanism and for the reconstruction of this Ancient Greek brass mechanism.

== Overview ==
Wright studied physics at the University of Oxford and history of technology at the University of London. He was a schoolmaster until 1971 when he joined the Science Museum in London, working there until 2004. For most of his career, Wright was the curator of mechanical engineering at the Science Museum. He then became an honorary research associate at the Centre for the History of Science, Technology and Medicine at Imperial College London. He is also a fellow at the Society of Antiquaries of London.

== Antikythera mechanism ==
Wright made a study of the original fragments of the Antikythera mechanism, an Ancient Greek brass mechanism, together with Allan George Bromley. They used a technique called linear X-ray tomography which was suggested by retired consultant radiologist, Alan Partridge. For this, Wright designed and made an apparatus for linear tomography, allowing the generation of sectional 2D radiographicimages. Early results of this survey were presented in 1997, which showed that Price's reconstruction was fundamentally flawed.

Further study of the new imagery allowed Wright to advance a number of proposals. Firstly he developed the idea, suggested by Price in "Gears from the Greeks", that the mechanism could have served as a planetarium. Wright's planetarium not only modelled the motion of the Sun and Moon, but also the Inferior Planets (Mercury and Venus), and the Superior Planets (Mars, Jupiter and Saturn).

He proposed that the Sun and Moon could have moved in accordance with the theories of Hipparchus and the five known planets moved according to the simple epicyclic theory suggested by the theorem of Apollonius. In order to prove that this was possible using the level of technology apparent in the mechanism, Wright produced a working model of such a planetarium.

Wright also increased upon Price's gear count of 27 to 31 including 1 in Fragment C that was eventually identified as part of a Moon phase display. He suggested that this is a mechanism that shows the phase of the Moon by means of a rotating semi-silvered ball, realized by the differential rotation of the sidereal cycle of the Moon and the Sun's yearly cycle. This precedes previously known mechanisms of this sort by a millennium and a half.

More accurate tooth counts were also obtained, allowing a new gearing scheme to be advanced. This more accurate information allowed Wright to confirm Price's perceptive suggestion that the upper back dial displays the Metonic cycle with 235 lunar months divisions over a five-turn scale. In addition to this Wright proposed the remarkable idea that the main back dials are in the form of spirals, with the upper back dial out as a five-turn spiral containing 47 divisions in each turn. It therefore presented a visual display of the 235 months of the Metonic cycle (19 years ≈ 235 Synodic Months). Wright also observed that fragmentary inscriptions suggested that the pointer on the subsidiary dial showed a count of four cycles of the 19-year period, equal to the 76-year Callippic cycle.

Based on more tentative observations, Wright also came to the conclusion that the lower back dial counted Draconic Months and could perhaps have been used for eclipse prediction.

All these findings have been incorporated into Wright's working model, demonstrating that a single mechanism with all these functions could be built, and would work.

Despite the improved imagery provided by the linear tomography, Wright could not reconcile all the known gears into a single coherent mechanism, and this led him to advance the theory that the mechanism had been altered, with some astronomical functions removed and others added.

Finally, as an outcome of his research, Wright also conclusively demonstrated that Price's suggestion of the existence of a differential gearing arrangement was incorrect.

In 2006, Wright completed what he believed to be an almost exact replica of the mechanism. With that came a paper dated 2007 entitled "The Antikythera mechanism reconsidered", recapitulating most of the points made above. In a footnote to that paper dated 29 November 2006, Wright acknowledges details explained by the Antikythera Mechanism Research Program since his publication:

Note added 29 November 2006: This paper was submitted on 2 September 2006 and accepted for publication on 26 October 2006. Since then the Antikythera Mechanism Research Project Group has published interesting findings [citation:]. Their independent survey has included study of the newly discovered fragment F, a part of the lower back dial which was not available to me. Their reading of the inscriptions on this dial reveals that the function displayed on it was the eclipse cycle of 223 synodic months, distributed around the four-turn spiral scale. (As eclipses of the Sun are rare events, the engraved sequence may, in principle, afford means for dating the Mechanism.) One revolution of the pointer thus represented (223÷4) synodic months, not one draconitic month as I have suggested. The Group offers a modification of my gear train which achieves this function and also incorporates exactly those mechanical features that I characterised as having probably been made redundant by alteration of the instrument. The satisfactory way in which the Group’s suggestions for these parts fall in with my own observations of the artefact itself, and remove residual difficulties with my reconstruction, lead me to believe that they are correct. I have no hesitation either in adopting the Group’s revisions of the function of the lower back dial and of the internal mechanism or in withdrawing statements concerning these features that conflict with them. The changes, though important, are physically quite slight, and do not affect my arguments for other significant features of my reconstruction. I stand by the conclusions of my paper.

Wright's research on the mechanism has continued in parallel with the efforts of the Antikythera Mechanism Research Project (AMRP). On 6 March 2007, he presented his model in the National Hellenic Research Foundation in Athens, Greece.

== See also ==
- Antikythera mechanism: Michael Wright
