= London Centre =

London Centre may refer to:

- London Centre (federal electoral district)
- London Centre (provincial electoral district)
- London Centre for the History of Science, Medicine, and Technology

== See also ==
- London, Ontario
