= Spyridon Stais =

Greek politician

Spyridon Stais (Greek: Σπυρίδων Στάης, 1859–1932) was a Greek politician from the island of Kythera.

He studied physics and mathematics and served as a teacher in gymnasia (secondary schools) of Greece. He became active in politics in 1892, joining first the party of Charilaos Trikoupis and later (after Trikoupis’ death) the Modernist Party of Georgios Theotokis. He served as a member of parliament, as Minister for Education under prime minister Theotokis (in 1900 and again in 1903), as Minister of the Interior (1921–1922) under Dimitrios Gounaris and finally as general governor of Thessaloniki (1922) under Petros Protopapadakis.

In 1902 Stais first noticed the Antikythera mechanism among other unidentified scraps of bronze, during a visit to the National Archaeological Museum in Athens.
