= Halieia =

Ancient Rhodian festival in honor of Helios

The Halieia (Ancient Greek: Ἁλίεια, Halíeia) or Halia was one of the principal festivals celebrated on the island of Rhodes in honour of their patron god Helios, the Sun. It was held every year in summer, with gymnic and musical contests and a great procession.

== Name ==
The name of the festival derives from Halios, the Doric spelling of Helios' name.

== Description ==
The festival included games of horse-racing and chariot-racing, gymnastic contests for men and boys, as well as music contests, and a sacrifice. The prize offered for the victors was a wreath of white poplar, a tree which was sacred to the god, due to the brilliance of its shining leaves. According to Festus (s. v. October Equus), the Halieia also included a ritual, that took place on the 24th day of the summer month of Gorpiaeus, where the Rhodians sacrificed to the god a team of four white horses, by driving a four-horse chariot, representing the chariot of the sun, into the sea.

This ritual symbolised the setting of the sun as it sinks into the sea, and in that way the Rhodians honoured his role as the celestial charioteer. The Halieia drew athletes and musicians from all over the Greek world, and when the Colossus of Rhodes was erected in the harbour, the cult gained even more fame; the festival attracted great athletes from abroad, and victors of games such as the Pythia, the Isthmia and the Nemea found it worthwhile to compete in the Halieia. In the glory days of Rhodes, the neighbouring kingdoms, such as Pergamon in Anatolia, would send envoys to the festival, and it was still flourishing even centuries after that.

In the fictional work Ephesian Tale by Xenophon of Ephesus, the protagonists find themselves at Rhodes during a festival in honour of Helios, described thus:

[T]he next Day was a Festival dedicated to the Sun, and celebrated by the Rhodians, with the utmost publick Magnificence, the Pomp, the Sacrifices, and the Concourse of the Citizens, being exceeding great.

The protagonist of the story, Anthia, cuts and dedicates some of her hair in Helios' temple with the inscription Anthia dedicated this hair to the god on behalf of Habrokomes.

The Games dial on the Antikythera mechanism, an Ancient Greek hand-powered orrery, is divided into four sectors, one of which is inscribed with the word Halieia, as it was possibly used to track the cycle of various athletic games in antiquity.

== Connections ==
Rituals involving the sacrifice of horses in a similar manner to the sea-god Poseidon Hippios are also attested, and might have influenced the horse-sacrificing rituals to Helios. The Argives drowned horses in Poseidon's honour, in Illyria horses were offered to him every four years in the same manner as during the Halieia, while he was worshipped as Hippios, god of horses, in Lindos, one of the principal Rhodian cities. Scholars have associated these rites, along with those of another Rhodian festival, the Hippokathesia.

== See also ==
- Ecdysia
- Pandia
- Isthmian games
