= Centre for the History of Science, Technology and Medicine =

The Centre for the History of Science, Technology and Medicine (CHoSTM) is an academic department of King's College London which teaches and researches the History of Science.

== History ==
Originally, it was one of Imperial College London's three departments forming the London Centre for the History of Science, Medicine, and Technology. CHoSTM's offices were located in the Central Library at Imperial College's South Kensington Campus in London, United Kingdom.

CHoSTM was formed in 1992 and subsequently merged with the Humanities Programme in 2007, although the subject had been taught by the college since 1963. It was the highest rated UK history department in the 2008 Research Assessment Exercise.

== Move to King's College London ==
At the end of 2012 King's College London announced that the Centre would become part of their campus.

== See also ==
- Imperial College London
- London Centre for the History of Science, Medicine, and Technology
  - Department of Science and Technology Studies, University College London
