= Ioannis Theofanidis =

Greek Navy officer and scholar

Ioannis Theofanidis (Greek: Ιωάννης Θεοφανίδης) was a Greek Navy officer and scholar.

After studies in the Hellenic Navy Academy, Theofanidis served during the Greco-Turkish War of 1897 and the Balkan Wars (where he was adjutant to the Greek fleet commander, Pavlos Kountouriotis), finally retiring as a Rear Admiral in 1923.

Theofanidis was a hero during the evacuation of Smyrna in 1922, working with Asa K. Jennings and Admiral Halsey Powell, saving hundreds-of-thousands of lives.

Having taught history in the Navy Academy, Theofanidis dedicated himself to historical research thereafter, editing publishing the archives of his wife's great-great-grandfather, the hero of the Greek Revolution Theodoros Kolokotronis, studies on the history of the Greek Navy in the periods 1824–26 (Ο Αγών της Ανεξαρτησίας, Ιστορία του ελληνικού ναυτικού. Σεπτέμβριος 1824 - Απρίλιος 1826: Νεόκαστρον-Καφηρεύς-Αλεξάνδρεια-Μεσολόγγιον, 1932) and 1909–13 (Ιστορία του Ελληνικού Ναυτικού 1909-1913: μετ'εικόνων και χαρτών, 1923), on the downfall of Napoleon after the Battle of Waterloo (Η Πτώσις του Ναπολέοντος: η γαλλική Βουλή μετά το Βατερλώ-"Βελερεφόντης"-"Νορθούμπερλαντ"-Αγία Ελένη, 1933) and on his campaign in Syria against Sir Sidney Smith (Ναπολέων - Σερ Σίδνεϋ Σμιθ, 1929).

In the 1920s he came across and became obsessed with the study of the Antikythera mechanism, selling off family property to finance his research into reconstructing a model of the device. He published a first set of his findings in 1934, but most of his work remained unpublished and unknown after his death.

With his wife, Aikaterini Ioannidou, he had two children, a daughter Elli and a son, Iason, who also became a naval officer.
