= Antikythera mechanism =

Ancient Greek analogue astronomical computer

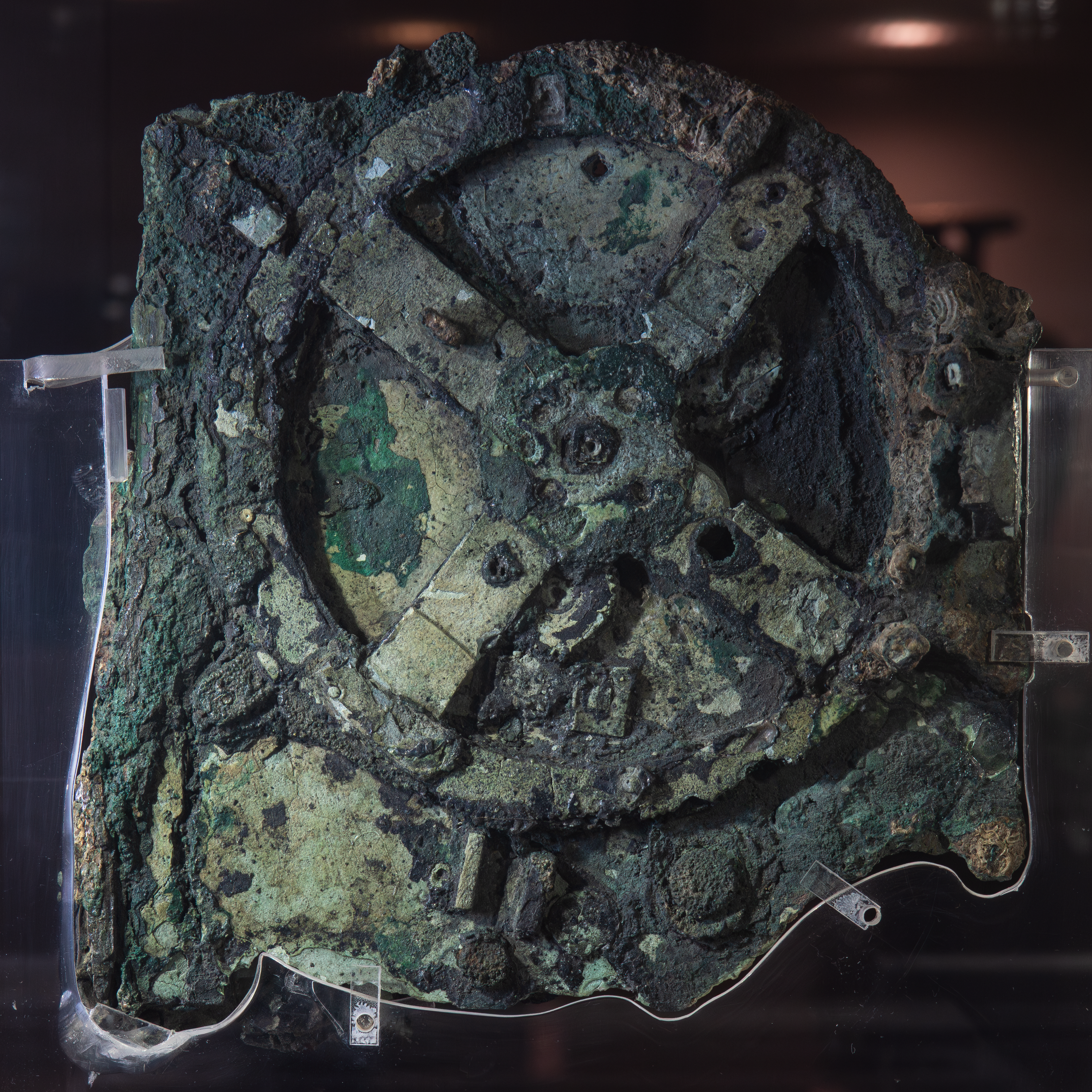
- The Antikythera mechanism (fragment A – front and rear); visible is the largest gear in the mechanism, about 13 cm (5 in) in diameter.

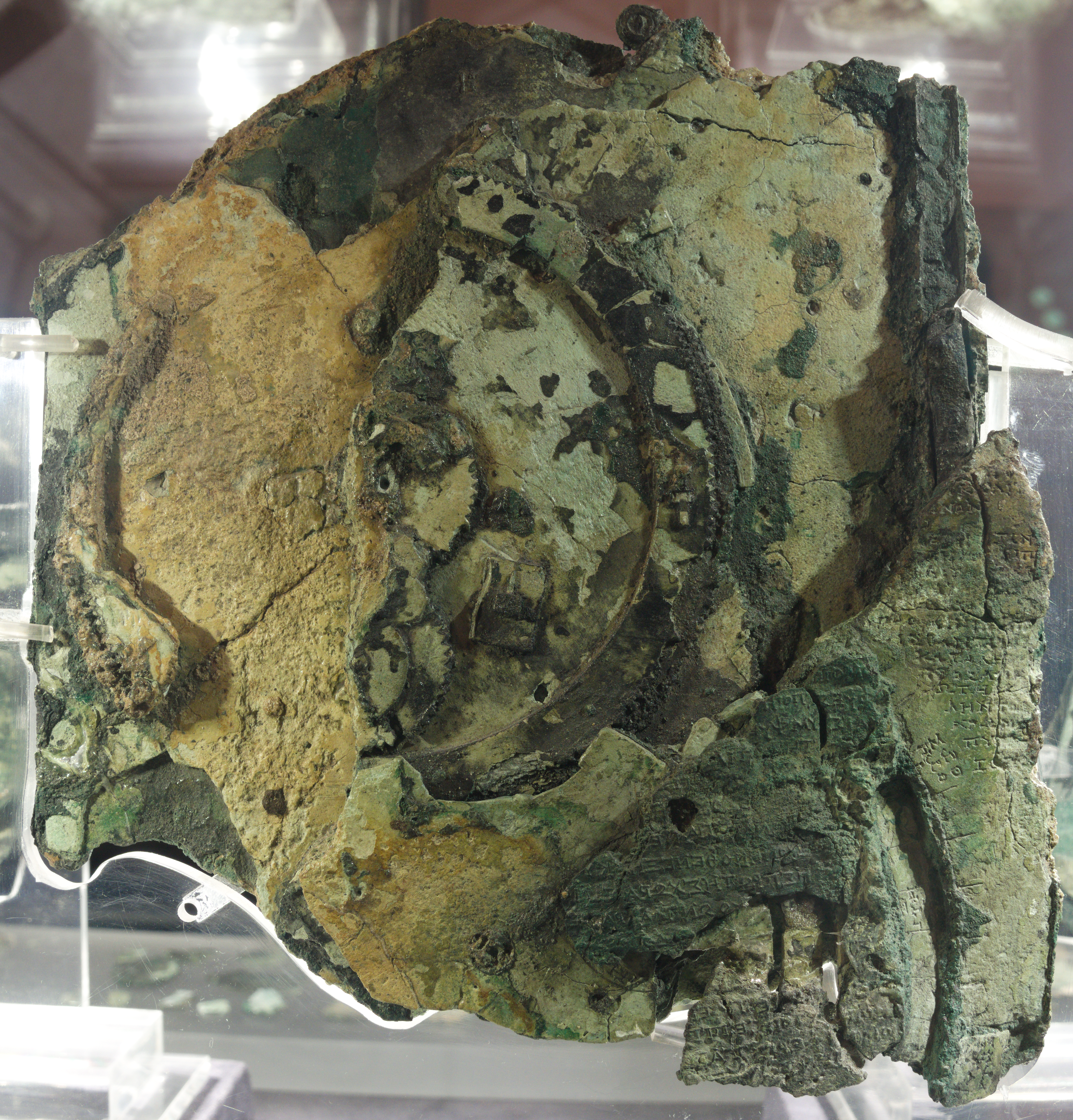
- Type: Analogue computer
- Writing: Ancient Greek
- Created: 2nd century BC
- Period/culture: Hellenistic
- Discovered: 1901; Antikythera, Greece
- Present location: National Archaeological Museum, Athens

The Antikythera mechanism (/ˌæntɪkɪˈθɪərə/ AN-tik-ih-THEER-ə, US also /ˌæntaɪkɪˈ-/ AN-ty-kih-) is an ancient Greek hand-powered orrery (model of the Solar System) built in the 2nd century BC and discovered in 1901. It is the oldest known example of an analogue computer. It could be used to predict astronomical positions and eclipses decades in advance. It could also be used to track the four-year cycle of athletic games similar to an olympiad, the cycle of the ancient Olympic Games.

The artefact was among wreckage retrieved from a shipwreck off the coast of the Greek island Antikythera in 1901. In 1902, during a visit to the National Archaeological Museum in Athens, it was noticed by Greek politician Spyridon Stais as containing a gear, prompting the first study of the fragment by his cousin, Valerios Stais, the museum director. The device, housed in the remains of a wooden-framed case of (uncertain) overall size 34 cm × 18 cm × 9 cm (13.4 in × 7.1 in × 3.5 in), was found as one lump, later separated into three main fragments which are now divided into 82 separate fragments after conservation efforts. Four of these fragments contain gears, while inscriptions are found on many others. The largest gear is about 13 cm (5 in) in diameter and originally had 223 teeth. All these fragments of the mechanism are kept at the National Archaeological Museum, along with reconstructions and replicas, to demonstrate how it may have looked and worked.

In 2005, a team from Cardiff University led by Mike Edmunds used computer X-ray tomography and high resolution scanning to image inside fragments of the crust-encased mechanism and read faint inscriptions that once covered the outer casing. These scans suggest that the mechanism had 35 meshing bronze gears, 30 of which are still visible, enabling it to follow the movements of the Moon and the Sun through the zodiac, to predict eclipses and to model the irregular orbit of the Moon, where the Moon's speed is higher in its perigee than in its apogee. This motion was studied in the 2nd century BC by astronomer Hipparchus of Rhodes, and he may have been consulted in the machine's construction. There is speculation that a portion of the mechanism is missing and it calculated the positions of the five classical planets. The inscriptions were further deciphered in 2016, revealing numbers connected with the synodic cycles of Venus and Saturn.

The instrument is believed to have been designed and constructed by Hellenistic scientists and been variously dated to about 87 BC, between 150 and 100 BC, or 205 BC. It must have been constructed before the shipwreck, which has been dated by multiple lines of evidence to approximately 70–60 BC. In 2022, researchers proposed its initial calibration date, not construction date, could have been 23 December 178 BC. Other experts propose 204 BC as a more likely calibration date. Machines with similar complexity did not appear again until the 14th century in western Europe.

== History ==
=== Discovery ===
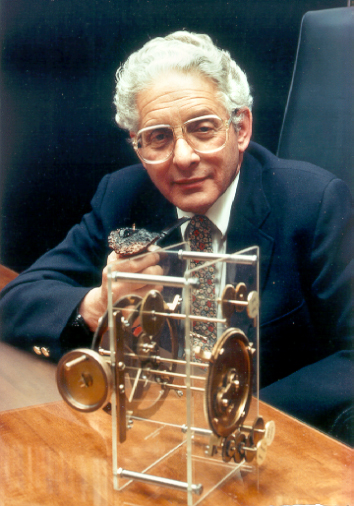
Derek J. de Solla Price (1922–1983) with a model of the Antikythera mechanism

Captain Dimitrios Kontos (Δημήτριος Κοντός) and a crew of sponge divers from Symi island discovered the Antikythera wreck in early 1900, and recovered artefacts during the first expedition with the Hellenic Royal Navy, in 1900–1901. This wreck of a Roman cargo ship was found at a depth of 45 metres (148 ft) off Point Glyphadia on the Greek island of Antikythera. The team retrieved numerous large objects, including bronze and marble statues, pottery, unique glassware, jewellery, coins, and the mechanism. The mechanism was retrieved from the wreckage in 1901, probably July. It is unknown how the mechanism came to be on the cargo ship.

All of the items retrieved from the wreckage were transferred to the National Museum of Archaeology in Athens for storage and analysis. The mechanism appeared to be a lump of corroded bronze and wood. The bronze had turned into atacamite which cracked and shrank when it was brought up from the shipwreck, changing the dimensions of the pieces. It went unnoticed for two years, while museum staff worked on piecing together more obvious treasures, such as the statues. Upon removal from seawater, the mechanism was not treated, resulting in deformational changes.

On 17 May 1902, archaeologist Valerios Stais, together with his cousin, the Greek politician Spyridon Stais, found one of the pieces of rock had a gear wheel embedded in it. He initially believed that it was an astronomical clock, but most scholars considered the device to be prochronistic, too complex to have been constructed during the same period as the other pieces that had been discovered.

The German philologist Albert Rehm became interested in the device and was the first to propose that it was an astronomical calculator.

Investigations into the object lapsed until British science historian and Yale University professor Derek J. de Solla Price became interested in 1951. In 1971, Price and Greek nuclear physicist Charalampos Karakalos made X-ray and gamma-ray images of the 82 fragments. Price published a paper on their findings in 1974.

Two other searches for items at the Antikythera wreck site in 2012 and 2015 yielded art objects and a second ship which may be connected with the treasure ship on which the mechanism was found. Also found was a bronze disc, embellished with the image of a bull. The disc has four "ears" which have holes in them, and it was thought it may have been part of the Antikythera mechanism, as a cog wheel. There appears to be little evidence that it was part of the mechanism; it is more likely the disc was a bronze decoration on a piece of furniture.

=== Origin ===
The Antikythera mechanism is generally referred to as the first known analogue computer. The quality and complexity of the mechanism's manufacture suggests it must have had undiscovered predecessors during the Hellenistic period. Its construction relied on theories of astronomy and mathematics developed by Greek astronomers during the second century BC, and it is estimated to have been built in the late second century BC or the early first century BC.

In 2008, research by the Antikythera Mechanism Research Project suggested the concept for the mechanism may have originated in the colonies of Corinth, since they identified the calendar on the Metonic Spiral as coming from Corinth, or one of its colonies in northwest Greece or Sicily. Syracuse was a colony of Corinth and the home of Archimedes, and the Antikythera Mechanism Research Project argued in 2008 that it might imply a connection with the school of Archimedes. It was demonstrated in 2017 that the calendar on the Metonic Spiral is of the Corinthian type, but cannot be that of Syracuse. Another theory suggests that coins found by Jacques Cousteau at the wreck site in the 1970s date to the time of the device's construction, and posits that its origin may have been from the ancient Greek city of Pergamon, home of the Library of Pergamum. With its many scrolls of art and science, it was second in importance only to the Library of Alexandria during the Hellenistic period.

The ship carrying the device contained vases in the Rhodian style, leading to a hypothesis that it was constructed at an academy founded by Stoic philosopher Posidonius on that Greek island. Rhodes was a busy trading port and centre of astronomy and mechanical engineering, home to astronomer Hipparchus, who was active from about 140–120 BC. The mechanism uses Hipparchus' theory for the motion of the Moon, which suggests he may have designed or at least worked on it. It has been argued the astronomical events on the Parapegma of the mechanism work best for latitudes in the range of 33.3–37.0 degrees north; the island of Rhodes is located between the latitudes of 35.85 and 36.50 degrees north.

In 2014, a study argued for a new dating of approximately 200 BC, based on identifying the start-up date on the Saros Dial, as the astronomical lunar month that began shortly after the new moon of 28 April 205 BC. According to this theory the Babylonian arithmetic style of prediction fits much better with the device's predictive models than the traditional Greek trigonometric style. A study by Iversen in 2017 reasons that the prototype for the device was from Rhodes, but that this particular model was modified for a client from Epirus in northwestern Greece; Iversen argues it was probably constructed no earlier than a generation before the shipwreck, a date supported by Jones in 2017.

Further dives were undertaken in 2014 and 2015, in the hope of discovering more of the mechanism. A five-year programme of investigations began in 2014 and ended in October 2019, with a new five-year session starting in May 2020.

In 2022, researchers proposed the mechanism's initial calibration date, not construction date, could have been 23 December 178 BC. Other experts propose 204 BC as a more likely calibration date. Machines with similar complexity did not appear again for around 1,500 years, with early examples being the fourteenth century astronomical clocks of Richard of Wallingford and Giovanni de' Dondi.

== Design ==
The original mechanism apparently came out of the Mediterranean as a single encrusted piece. Soon afterwards it fractured into three major pieces. Other small pieces have broken off in the interim from cleaning and handling, and others were found on the sea floor by the Cousteau expedition. Other fragments may still be in storage, undiscovered since their initial recovery; Fragment F was discovered in that way in 2005. Of the 82 known fragments, seven are mechanically significant and contain the majority of the mechanism and inscriptions. Another 16 smaller parts contain fractional and incomplete inscriptions.

Major fragments
Fragment	Size [mm]	Weight [g]	Gears	Inscriptions	Notes
Fragment A	180 × 150	369.1	27	Yes	The main fragment contains the majority of the known mechanism. Clearly visible on the front is the large b1 gear, and under closer inspection further gears behind it (parts of the l, m, c, and d trains are visible as gears to the naked eye). The crank mechanism socket and the side-mounted gear that meshes with b1 is on Fragment A. The back of the fragment contains the rearmost e and k gears for synthesis of the moon anomaly, noticeable also is the pin and slot mechanism of the k train. It is noticed from detailed scans of the fragment that all gears are very closely packed and have sustained damage and displacement due to their years in the sea. The fragment is approximately 30 mm thick at its thickest point. Fragment A also contains divisions of the upper left quarter of the Saros spiral and 14 inscriptions from said spiral. The fragment also contains inscriptions for the exeligmos dial and visible on the back surface the remnants of the dial face. Finally, this fragment contains some back door inscriptions.
Fragment B	125 × 60	99.4	1	Yes	Contains approximately the bottom right third of the Metonic spiral and inscriptions of both the spiral and back door of the mechanism. The Metonic scale would have consisted of 235 cells of which 49 have been deciphered from fragment B either in whole or partially. The rest so far are assumed from knowledge of the Metonic cycle. This fragment also contains a single gear (o1) used in the Olympic train.
Fragment C	120 × 110	63.8	1	Yes	Contains parts of the upper right of the front dial face showing calendar and zodiac inscriptions. This fragment also contains the Moon indicator dial assembly including the Moon phase sphere in its housing and a single bevel gear (ma1) used in the Moon phase indication system.
Fragment D	45 × 35	15.0	1		Contains at least one unknown gear; according to Michael T. Wright it contains possibly two, and according to Xenophon Moussas it contains one gear (numbered 45 "ME") inside a hollow gear giving the position of Jupiter reproducing it with epicyclic motion. Their purpose and position has not been ascertained to any accuracy or consensus, but lends to the debate for the possible planet displays on the face of the mechanism.
Fragment E	60 × 35	22.1		Yes	Found in 1976 and contains six inscriptions from the upper right of the Saros spiral.
Fragment F	90 × 80	86.2		Yes	Found in 2005 and contains 16 inscriptions from the lower right of the Saros spiral. It also contains remnants of the mechanism's wooden housing.
Fragment G	125 × 110	31.7		Yes	A combination of fragments taken from fragment C while cleaning.

Many of the smaller fragments that have been found contain nothing of apparent value, but a few have inscriptions on them. Fragment 19 contains significant back door inscriptions including one reading "... 76 years ..." which refers to the Callippic cycle. Other inscriptions seem to describe the function of the back dials. In addition to this important minor fragment, 15 further minor fragments have remnants of inscriptions on them.

== Mechanics ==
Animation of the Antikythera mechanism

Information on the specific data obtained from the fragments is detailed in the supplement to the 2006 Nature article from Freeth et al.

=== Operation ===
On the front face of the mechanism, there is a fixed ring dial representing the ecliptic, the twelve zodiacal signs marked off with equal 30-degree sectors. This matched with the Babylonian custom of assigning one twelfth of the ecliptic to each zodiac sign equally, even though the constellation boundaries were variable. Outside that dial is another ring which is rotatable, marked off with the months and days of the Sothic Egyptian calendar, twelve months of 30 days plus five intercalary days. The months are marked with the Egyptian names for the months transcribed into the Greek alphabet. The first task is to rotate the Egyptian calendar ring to match the current zodiac points. The Egyptian calendar ignored leap days, so it advanced through a full zodiac sign in about 120 years.

The mechanism was operated by turning a small hand crank (now lost) which was linked via a crown gear to the largest gear, the four-spoked gear visible on the front of fragment A, gear b1. This moved the date pointer on the front dial, which would be set to the correct Egyptian calendar day. The year is not selectable, so it is necessary to know the year currently set, or by looking up the cycles indicated by the various calendar cycle indicators on the back in the Babylonian ephemeris tables for the day of the year currently set, since most of the calendar cycles are not synchronous with the year. The crank moves the date pointer about 78 days per full rotation, so hitting a particular day on the dial would be easily possible if the mechanism were in good working condition. The action of turning the hand crank would also cause all interlocked gears within the mechanism to rotate, resulting in the simultaneous calculation of the position of the Sun and Moon, the moon phase, eclipse, and calendar cycles, and perhaps the locations of planets.

The operator also had to be aware of the position of the spiral dial pointers on the two large dials on the back. The pointer had a "follower" that tracked the spiral incisions in the metal as the dials incorporated four and five full rotations of the pointers. When a pointer reached the terminal month location at either end of the spiral, the pointer's follower had to be manually moved to the other end of the spiral before proceeding further.

=== Faces ===
Computer-generated front panel of the Freeth model

==== Front face ====
The front dial has two concentric circular scales. The inner scale marks the Greek signs of the zodiac, with division in degrees. The outer scale, which is a movable ring that sits flush with the surface and runs in a channel, is marked off with what appear to be days and has a series of corresponding holes beneath the ring in the channel.

Since the discovery of the mechanism more than a century ago, this outer ring has been presumed to represent a 365-day Egyptian solar calendar, but research (Budiselic, et al., 2020) challenged this presumption and provided direct statistical evidence there are 354 intervals, suggesting a lunar calendar. Since this initial discovery, two research teams, using different methods, independently calculated the interval count. Woan and Bayley calculate 354–355 intervals using two different methods, confirming with higher accuracy the Budiselic et al. findings and noting that "365 holes is not plausible". Malin and Dickens' best estimate is 352.3±1.5 and concluded that the number of holes (N) "has to be integral and the SE (standard error) of 1.5 indicates that there is less than a 5% probability that N is not one of the six values in the range 350 to 355. The chances of N being as high as 365 are less than 1 in 10,000. While other contenders cannot be ruled out, of the two values that have been proposed for N on astronomical grounds, that of Budiselic et al. (354) is by far the more likely."

If one supports the 365 day presumption, it is recognized the mechanism predates the Julian calendar reform, but the Sothic and Callippic cycles had already pointed to a 365 1/4 day solar year, as seen in Ptolemy III's attempted calendar reform of 238 BC. The dials are not believed to reflect his proposed leap day (Epag. 6), but the outer calendar dial may be moved against the inner dial to compensate for the effect of the extra quarter-day in the solar year by turning the scale backward one day every four years.

If one is in favour of the 354 day evidence, the most likely interpretation is that the ring is a manifestation of a 354-day lunar calendar. Given the era of the mechanism's presumed construction and the presence of Egyptian month names, it is possibly the first example of the Egyptian civil-based lunar calendar proposed by Richard Anthony Parker in 1950. The lunar calendar's purpose was to serve as a day-to-day indicator of successive lunations, and would also have assisted with the interpretation of the lunar phase pointer, and the Metonic and Saros dials. Undiscovered gearing, synchronous with the rest of the Metonic gearing of the mechanism, is implied to drive a pointer around this scale. Movement and registration of the ring relative to the underlying holes served to facilitate both a 1-in-76-year Callippic cycle correction, as well as convenient lunisolar intercalation.

The dial also marks the position of the Sun on the ecliptic, corresponding to the current date in the year. The orbits of the Moon and the five planets known to the Greeks are close enough to the ecliptic to make it a convenient reference for defining their positions as well.

The following three Egyptian months are inscribed in Greek letters on the surviving pieces of the outer ring:

- ΠΑΧΩΝ (Pashons)
- ΠΑΥΝΙ (Payni)
- ΕΠΙΦΙ (Epiphi)

The other months have been reconstructed; some reconstructions of the mechanism omit the five days of the Egyptian intercalary month. The Zodiac dial contains Greek inscriptions of the members of the zodiac, which is believed to be adapted to the tropical month version rather than the sidereal:

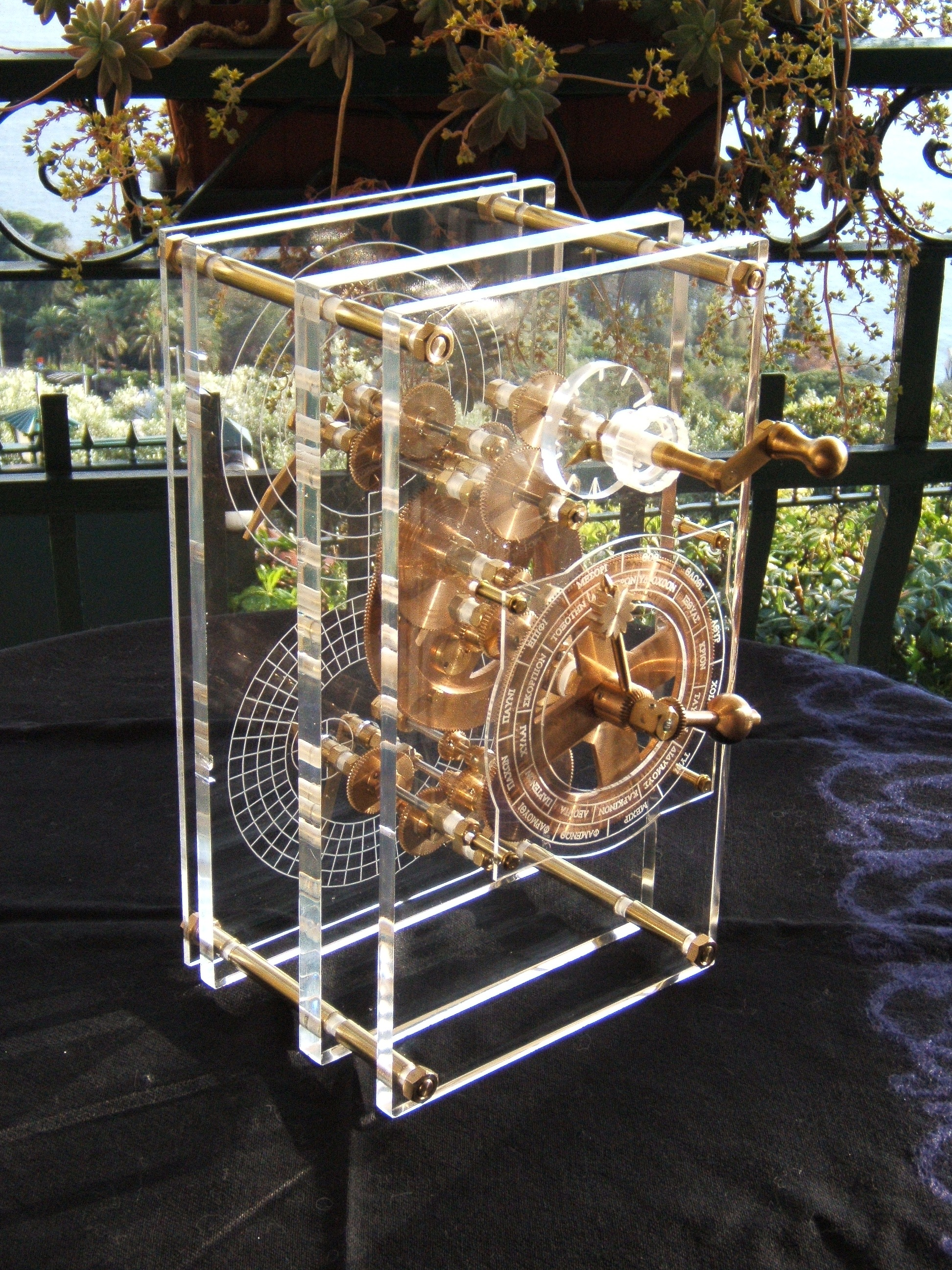
Front panel of a 2007 re-creation

- ΚΡΙΟΣ (Krios [Ram], Aries)
- ΤΑΥΡΟΣ (Tauros [Bull], Taurus)
- ΔΙΔΥΜΟΙ (Didymoi [Twins], Gemini)
- ΚΑΡΚΙΝΟΣ (Karkinos [Crab], Cancer)
- ΛΕΩΝ (Leon [Lion], Leo)
- ΠΑΡΘΕΝΟΣ (Parthenos [Maiden], Virgo)
- ΧΗΛΑΙ (Chelai [Scorpio's Claw or Zygos], Libra)
- ΣΚΟΡΠΙΟΣ (Skorpios [Scorpion], Scorpio)
- ΤΟΞΟΤΗΣ (Toxotes [Archer], Sagittarius)
- ΑΙΓΟΚΕΡΩΣ (Aigokeros [Goat-horned], Capricorn)
- ΥΔΡΟΧΟΟΣ (Hydrokhoos [Water carrier], Aquarius)
- ΙΧΘΥΕΣ (Ichthyes [Fish], Pisces)

Also on the zodiac dial are single characters at specific points (see reconstruction at ref). They are keyed to a parapegma, a precursor of the modern day almanac inscribed on the front face above and beneath the dials. They mark the locations of longitudes on the ecliptic for specific stars. The parapegma above the dials reads (square brackets indicate inferred text):

Α	ΑΙΓΟΚΕΡΩΣ ΑΡΧΕΤΑΙ; ΑΝΑΤΕΛΛΕΙΝ [...] Α	Capricorn begins to rise	Ι	ΚΡΙΟΣ ΑΡΧΕΤΑΙ ΕΠΙΤΕΛΛΕΙΝ [...] Α	Aries begins to rise
	ΤΡΟΠΑΙ ΧΕΙΜΕΡΙΝΑΙ [...] Α	Winter solstice		ΙΣΗΜΕΡΙΑ ΕΑΡΙΝΗ [...] Α	Vernal equinox
Β	[...] ΕΙ ΕΣΠΕΡΙ	... evening	Κ	[...] ΕΣΠΕΡΙΑ [...] ΙΑ	... evening
Γ	[...] ΙΕΣΠΕΡΙ	... evening	Λ	ΥΑΔΕΣ ΔΥΝΟΥΣΙΝ; ΕΣΠΕΡΙΑΙ [...] ΚΑ	The Hyades set in the evening
Δ	[...] ΥΔΡΟΧΟΟΣ ΑΡΧΕΤΑΙ; ΕΠΙΤΕΛΛΕΙΝΑ	Aquarius begins to rise	Μ	ΤΑΥΡΟΣ ΑΡΧΕΤΑΙ; Ε{Π}ΙΤΕΛΛΕΙΝΑ	Taurus begins to rise
Ε	[...] ΕΣΠΕΡΙΟΣ [...] Ι{Ο}	... evening	Ν	ΛΥΡΑ ΕΠΙΤΕΛΛΕΙ; ΕΣΠΕΡΙΛ [...] Δ	Lyra rises in the evening
Ζ	[...] ΡΙΑΙ [...] Κ	... {evening}	Ξ	ΠΛΕΙΑΣ ΕΠΙΤΕΛΛΕΙ; ΕΩΙΑ [...] Ι	The Pleiades rise in the morning
Η	ΙΧΘΥΕΣ ΑΡΧΟΝΤΑΙ; ΕΠΙΤΕΛΛΕΙΝ [...] Α	Pisces begins to rise	Ο	ΥΑΣ ΕΠΙΤΕΛΛΕΙ ΕΩΙΑ [...] Δ	The Hyades rise in the morning
Θ	[...] {Ι}Α		Π	ΔΙΔΥΜΟΙ ΑΡΧΟΝΤΑ; ΕΠΙΤΕΛΛΕΙΝ [...] Α	Gemini begins to rise
			Ρ	ΑΕΤΟΣ ΕΠΙΤΕΛΛΕΙ ΕΣΠΕΡΙΟΣ	Altair rises in the evening
			Σ	ΑΡΚΤΟΥΡΟΣ ΔΥΝΕΙ Ε{Ω}{Ι}ΟΣ	Arcturus sets in the morning

The parapegma beneath the dials reads:

Α	ΧΗΛΑΙ ΑΡΧΟΝΤΑ; ΕΠΙΤΕΛΛΕΙΝ [...] Α	Libra begins to rise	Μ	ΚΑΡΚΙΝΟΣ ΑΡΧΕΤΑΙ [...] Α	Cancer begins {to rise}
	{Ι}ΣΗΜΕΡΙΑ ΦΘΙΝΟΠΩΡΙΝΗ [...] Α	Autumnal equinox		ΤΡΟΠΑΙ ΘΕΡΙΝΑΙ [...] Α	Summer solstice
Β	[...] ΑΝΑΤΕΛΛΟΥΣΙΝ; ΕΣΠΕΡΙΟΙΙΑ	... rise in the evening	Ν	ΩΡΙΩΝ ΑΝΤΕΛΛΕΙ ΕΩΙΟΣ	Orion precedes the morning
Γ	[...] ΑΝΑΤΕΛΛΕΙ ΕΣΠΕΡΙΑΙΔ	... rise in the evening	Ξ	{Κ}ΥΩΝ ΑΝΤΕΛΛΕΙ ΕΩΙΟΣ	Canis Major precedes the morning
Δ	[...] ΤΕΛΛΕΙΙ{Ο}	... rise	Ο	ΑΕΤΟΣ ΔΥΝΕΙ ΕΩΙΟΣ	Altair sets in the morning
Ε	ΣΚΟΡΠΙΟΣ ΑΡΧΕΤΑΙ; ΑΝΑΤΕΛΛΕΙΝΑ	Scorpio begins to rise	Π	ΛΕΩΝ ΑΡΧΕΤΑΙ; ΕΠΙΤΕΛΛΕΙΝ [...] Α	Leo begins to rise
Ζ	[...]		Ρ	[...]	
Η	[...]		Σ	[...]	
Θ	[...]		Τ	[...]	
Ι	ΤΟΞΟΤΗΣ ΑΡΧΕΤΑΙ; ΕΠΙΤΕΛΛΕΙΝ [...] Α	Sagittarius begins to rise	Υ	[...]	
Κ	[...]		Φ	[...]	
Λ	[...]		Χ	[...]	

At least two pointers indicated positions of bodies upon the ecliptic. A lunar pointer indicated the position of the Moon, and a mean Sun pointer was shown, perhaps doubling as the current date pointer. The Moon position was not a simple mean Moon indicator which would indicate movement uniformly around a circular orbit; rather, it approximated the acceleration and deceleration of the Moon's elliptical orbit, through the earliest extant use of epicyclic gearing.

It also tracked the precession of the Moon's elliptical orbit around the ecliptic in an 8.88 year cycle. The mean Sun position is, by definition, the current date. It is speculated that since significant effort was taken to ensure the position of the Moon was correct, there was likely to have also been a "true sun" pointer in addition to the mean Sun pointer, to track the elliptical anomaly of the Sun (the orbit of Earth around the Sun), but there is no evidence of it among the fragments found. Similarly, neither is there the evidence of planetary orbit pointers for the five planets known to the Greeks among the fragments. But see Proposed gear schemes below.

Mechanical engineer Michael Wright demonstrated there was a mechanism to supply the lunar phase in addition to the position. The indicator was a small ball embedded in the lunar pointer, half-white and half-black, which rotated to show the phase (new, first quarter, half, third quarter, full, and back). The data to support this function is available given the Sun and Moon positions as angular rotations; essentially, it is the angle between the two, translated into the rotation of the ball. It requires a differential gear, a gearing arrangement that sums or differences two angular inputs.

==== Rear face ====
Computer-generated back panel

In 2008, scientists reported new findings in Nature showing the mechanism not only tracked the Metonic calendar and predicted solar eclipses, but also calculated the timing of panhellenic athletic games, such as the ancient Olympic Games. Inscriptions on the instrument closely match the names of the months that are used on calendars from Epirus in northwestern Greece and with the island of Corfu, which in antiquity was known as Corcyra.

On the back of the mechanism, there are five dials: the two large displays, the Metonic and the Saros, and three smaller indicators, the so-called Olympiad Dial, which has been renamed the Games dial as it did not track Olympiad years (the four-year cycle it tracks most closely is the Halieiad), the Callippic, and the exeligmos.

The Metonic dial is the main upper dial on the rear of the mechanism. The Metonic cycle, defined in several physical units, is 235 synodic months, which is very close (to within less than 13 one-millionths) to 19 tropical years. It is therefore a convenient interval over which to convert between lunar and solar calendars. The Metonic dial covers 235 months in five rotations of the dial, following a spiral track with a follower on the pointer that keeps track of the layer of the spiral. The pointer points to the synodic month, counted from new moon to new moon, and the cell contains the Corinthian month names.

1. ΦΟΙΝΙΚΑΙΟΣ (Phoinikaios)
2. ΚΡΑΝΕΙΟΣ (Kraneios)
3. ΛΑΝΟΤΡΟΠΙΟΣ (Lanotropios)
4. ΜΑΧΑΝΕΥΣ (Machaneus, "mechanic", referring to Zeus the inventor)
5. ΔΩΔΕΚΑΤΕΥΣ (Dodekateus)
6. ΕΥΚΛΕΙΟΣ (Eukleios)
7. ΑΡΤΕΜΙΣΙΟΣ (Artemisios)
8. ΨΥΔΡΕΥΣ (Psydreus)
9. ΓΑΜΕΙΛΙΟΣ (Gameilios)
10. ΑΓΡΙΑΝΙΟΣ (Agrianios)
11. ΠΑΝΑΜΟΣ (Panamos)
12. ΑΠΕΛΛΑΙΟΣ (Apellaios)

Thus, setting the correct solar time (in days) on the front panel indicates the current lunar month on the back panel, with resolution to within a week or so.

Based on the fact that the calendar month names are consistent with all the evidence of the Epirote calendar and that the Games dial mentions the very minor Naa games of Dodona (in Epirus), it has been argued that the calendar on the mechanism is likely to be the Epirote calendar, and that this calendar was probably adopted from a Corinthian colony in Epirus, possibly Ambracia. It has been argued that the first month of the calendar, Phoinikaios, was ideally the month in which the autumn equinox fell, and that the start-up date of the calendar began shortly after the astronomical new moon of 23 August 205 BC.

The Games dial is the upper-right secondary dial. Its pointer is the only one on the instrument that moves anticlockwise as time advances. The dial is divided into four sectors, each of which is inscribed with a year indicator and the name of two Panhellenic Games: the "crown" games of Isthmia, Olympia, Nemea, and Pythia; and two lesser games: Naa (held at Dodona) and the Halieia of Rhodes. The inscriptions on each one of the four divisions are:

Olympic dial
Year of the cycle	Inside the dial inscription	Outside the dial inscription
1	LΑ	ΙΣΘΜΙΑ (Isthmia); ΟΛΥΜΠΙΑ (Olympia)
2	LΒ	ΝΕΜΕΑ (Nemea); NAA (Naa)
3	LΓ	ΙΣΘΜΙΑ (Isthmia); ΠΥΘΙΑ (Pythia)
4	LΔ	ΝΕΜΕΑ (Nemea); ΑΛΙΕΙΑ (Halieia)

The Saros dial is the main lower spiral dial on the rear of the mechanism. The Saros cycle is 18 years and 11 1/3 days long (6585.333... days), which is very close to 223 synodic months (6585.3211 days). It is defined as the cycle of repetition of the positions required to cause solar and lunar eclipses, and therefore, it could be used to predict them—not only the month, but the day and time of day. The cycle is approximately 8 hours longer than an integer number of days. Translated into global spin, that means an eclipse occurs not only eight hours later, but one-third of a rotation farther to the west. Glyphs in 51 of the 223 synodic month cells of the dial specify the occurrence of 38 lunar and 27 solar eclipses. Some of the abbreviations in the glyphs read:

- Σ = ΣΕΛΗΝΗ ("Selene", Moon)
- Η = ΗΛΙΟΣ ("Helios", Sun)
- H\M = ΗΜΕΡΑΣ ("Hemeras", of the day)
- ω\ρ = ωρα ("hora", hour)
- N\Y = ΝΥΚΤΟΣ ("Nuktos", of the night)

The glyphs show whether the designated eclipse is solar or lunar, and give the day of the month and hour. Solar eclipses may not be visible at any given point, and lunar eclipses are visible only if the Moon is above the horizon at the appointed hour. In addition, the inner lines at the cardinal points of the Saros dial indicate the start of a new full moon cycle. Based on the distribution of the times of the eclipses, it has been argued the start-up date of the Saros dial was shortly after the astronomical new moon of 28 April 205 BC.

The Exeligmos dial is the secondary lower dial on the rear of the mechanism. The exeligmos cycle is a 54-year triple Saros cycle that is 19,756 days long. Since the length of the Saros cycle is to a third of a day (namely, 6,585 days plus 8 hours), a full exeligmos cycle returns the counting to an integral number of days, as reflected in the inscriptions. The labels on its three divisions are:

- Blank or o ? (representing the number zero, assumed, not yet observed)
- H (number 8) means add 8 hours to the time mentioned in the display
- Iϛ (number 16) means add 16 hours to the time mentioned in the display

Thus the dial pointer indicates how many hours must be added to the glyph times of the Saros dial in order to calculate the exact eclipse times.

=== Doors ===
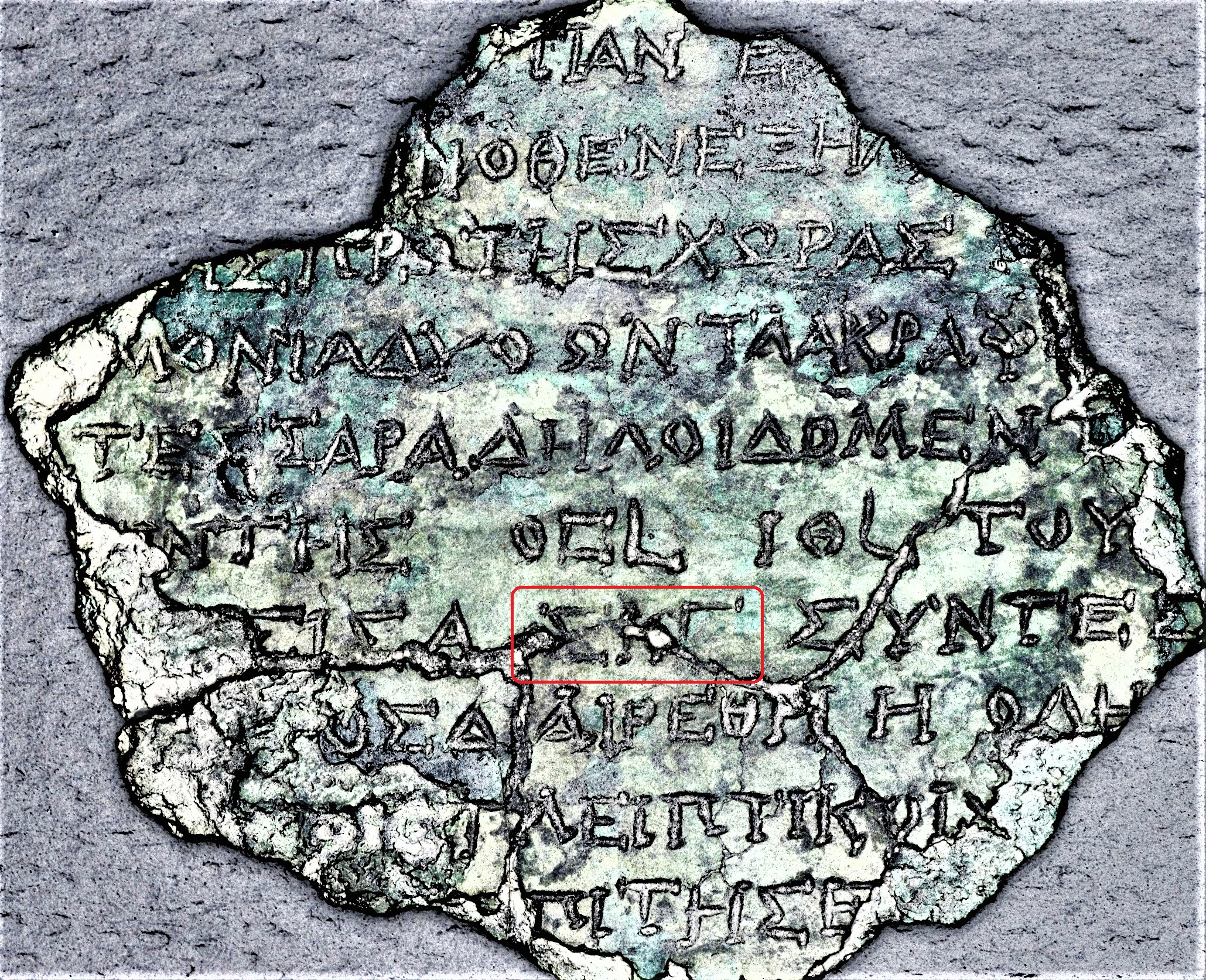
ΣΚΓ, indicating the Saros cycle of 223 months, present on fragment 19.

The mechanism has a wooden casing with a front and a back door, both containing inscriptions. The back door appears to be the 'instruction manual'. On fragment 19, it is written "76 years, 19 years" representing the Callippic and Metonic cycles. Also written is "223" for the Saros cycle. On fragment E, it is written "on the spiral subdivisions 235" referring to the Metonic dial.

=== Gearing ===
The mechanism is remarkable for the level of miniaturisation and the complexity of its parts, which is comparable to that of 14th-century astronomical clocks. It has at least 30 gears, although mechanism expert Michael Wright has suggested the Greeks of this period were capable of implementing a system with many more gears.

There is debate as to whether the mechanism had indicators for all five of the planets known to the ancient Greeks. No gearing for such a planetary display survives and all gears are accounted for—with the exception of one 63-toothed gear (r1) otherwise unaccounted for in fragment D.

Fragment D is a small quasi-circular constriction that, according to Xenophon Moussas, has a gear inside a somewhat larger hollow gear. The inner gear moves inside the outer gear reproducing an epicyclical motion that, with a pointer, gives the position of planet Jupiter. The inner gear is numbered 45, "ME" in Greek, and the same number is written on two surfaces of this small cylindrical box.

The purpose of the front face was to position astronomical bodies with respect to the celestial sphere along the ecliptic, in reference to the observer's position on the Earth. That is irrelevant to the question of whether that position was computed using a heliocentric or geocentric view of the Solar System; either computational method should, and does, result in the same position (ignoring ellipticity), within the error factors of the mechanism. The epicyclic Solar System of Ptolemy (c. 100 AD–c. 170 AD)—hundreds of years after the apparent construction date of the mechanism—carried forward with more epicycles, and was more accurate predicting the positions of planets than the view of Copernicus (1473–1543), until Kepler (1571–1630) introduced the possibility that orbits are ellipses.

Evans et al. suggest that to display the mean positions of the five classical planets would require only 17 further gears that could be positioned in front of the large driving gear and indicated using individual circular dials on the face.

Freeth and Jones modelled and published details of a version using gear trains mechanically similar to the lunar anomaly system, allowing for indication of the positions of the planets, as well as synthesis of the Sun anomaly. Their system, they claim, is more authentic than Wright's model, as it uses the known skills of the Greeks and does not add excessive complexity or internal stresses to the machine.

The gear teeth were in the form of equilateral triangles with an average circular pitch of 1.6 mm, an average wheel thickness of 1.4 mm and an average air gap between gears of 1.2 mm. The teeth were probably created from a blank bronze round using hand tools; this is evident because not all of them are even. Due to advances in imaging and X-ray technology, it is now possible to know the precise number of teeth and size of the gears within the located fragments. Thus the basic operation of the device is no longer a mystery and has been replicated accurately. The major unknown remains the question of the presence and nature of any planet indicators.

A table of the gears, their teeth, and the expected and computed rotations of important gears follows. The gear functions come from Freeth et al. (2008) and for the lower half of the table from Freeth et al. (2012). The computed values start with 1 year per revolution for the b1 gear, and the remainder are computed directly from gear teeth ratios. The gears marked with an asterisk (*) are missing, or have predecessors missing, from the known mechanism; these gears have been calculated with reasonable gear teeth counts. (Lengths in days are calculated assuming the year to be 365.2425 days.)

The Antikythera Mechanism: known and proposed gears and accuracy of computation
Gear name (Note: Change from traditional naming: X is the main year axis, turns once per year with gear B1. The B axis is the axis with gears B3 and B6, while the E axis is the axis with gears E3 and E4. Other axes on E (E1/E6 and E2/E5) are irrelevant to this table.)	Function of the gear/pointer	Length of time for a full circular revolution	Mechanism formula (Note: "Time" is the interval represented by one complete revolution of the gear.)	Computed interval	Gear direction (Note: As viewed from the front of the Mechanism. The "natural" view is viewing the side of the Mechanism the dial/pointer in question is actually displayed on.)
x	Year gear	1 tropical year	1 (by definition)	1 year (presumed)	clockwise (Note: The Greeks, being in the northern hemisphere, assumed proper daily motion of the stars was from east to west, anticlockwise when the ecliptic and zodiac is viewed to the south. As viewed on the front of the Mechanism.)
b	The Moon's orbit	1 sidereal month (27.321661 days)	Time(b) = Time(x) * (c1/b2) * (d1/c2) * (e2/d2) * (k1/e5) * (e6/k2) * (b3/e1)	27.321 days (Note: On average, due to epicyclic gearing causing accelerations and decelerations.)	clockwise
r	Lunar phase display	1 synodic month (29.530589 days)	Time(r) = 1 / (1 / Time(b2: mean sun or sun3: true sun)) – (1 / Time(b)))	29.530 days	
n*	Metonic pointer	Metonic cycle / 5 turns = 1387.94 days	Time(n) = Time(x) * (l1/b2) * (m1/l2) * (n1/m2)	1387.9 days	anticlockwise (Note: Being on the reverse side of the box, the "natural" rotation is the opposite)
o*	Games dial pointer	4 years (5551.8 days)	Time(o) = Time(n) * (o1/n2)	4.00 years	clockwise (Note: This was the only visual pointer naturally travelling in the anticlockwise direction.)
q*	Callippic pointer	27758.8 days	Time(q) = Time(n) * (p1/n3) * (q1/p2)	27758 days	anticlockwise
e*	Lunar orbit precession	8.88 years (3244.37 days)	Time(e) = Time(x) * (l1/b2) * (m1/l2) * (e3/m3)	8.8826 years	anticlockwise (Note: Internal and not visible.)
g*	Saros cycle	Saros time / 4 turns = 1646.33 days	Time(g) = Time(e) * (f1/e4) * (g1/f2)	1646.3 days	anticlockwise
i*	Exeligmos pointer	19755.8 days	Time(i) = Time(g) * (h1/g2) * (i1/h2)	19756 days	anticlockwise
The following are proposed gearing from the 2012 Freeth and Jones reconstruction:
sun3*	True sun pointer	1 mean year	Time(sun3) = Time(x) * (sun3/sun1) * (sun2/sun3)	1 mean year	clockwise (Note: Prograde motion; retrograde is obviously the opposite direction.)
mer2*	Mercury pointer	115.88 days (synodic period)	Time(mer2) = Time(x) * (mer2/mer1)	115.89 days	clockwise
ven2*	Venus pointer	583.93 days (synodic period)	Time(ven) = Time(x) * (ven1/sun1)	584.39 days	clockwise
mars4*	Mars pointer	779.96 days (synodic period)	Time(mars) = Time(x) * (mars2/mars1) * (mars4/mars3)	779.84 days	clockwise
jup4*	Jupiter pointer	398.88 days (synodic period)	Time(jup) = Time(x) * (jup2/jup1) * (jup4/jup3)	398.88 days	clockwise
sat4*	Saturn pointer	378.09 days (synodic period)	Time(sat) = Time(x) * (sat2/sat1) * (sat4/sat3)	378.06 days	clockwise

Table notes:

There are several gear ratios for each planet that result in close matches to the correct values for synodic periods of the planets and the Sun. Those chosen above seem accurate, with reasonable tooth counts, but the specific gears actually used are unknown.

==== Known gear scheme ====
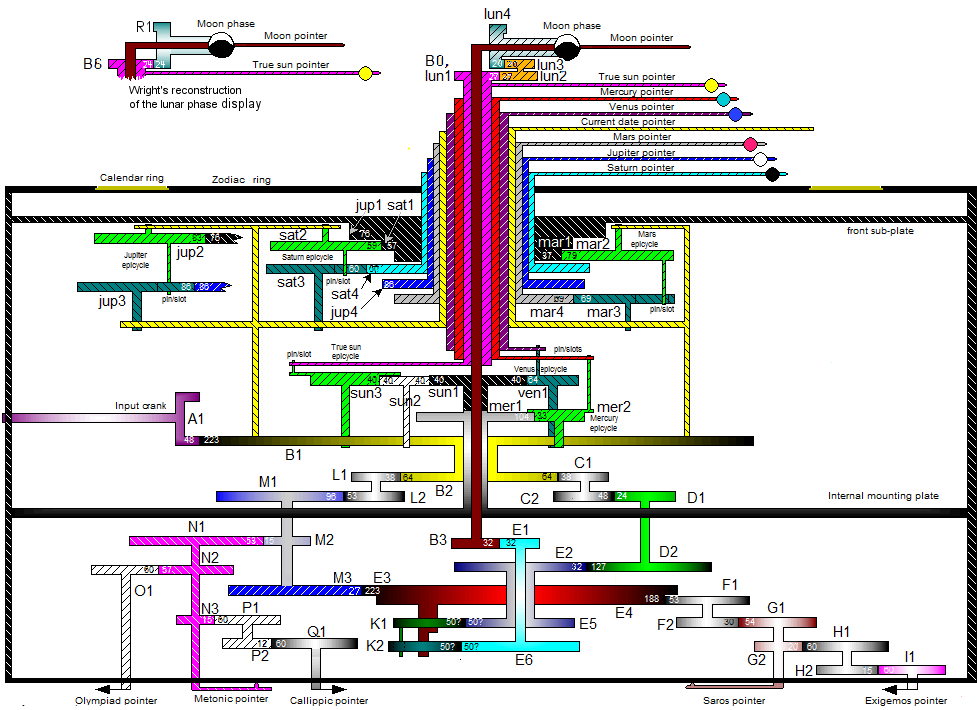
A hypothetical schematic representation of the gearing of the Antikythera Mechanism, including the 2012 published interpretation of existing gearing, gearing added to complete known functions, and proposed gearing to accomplish additional functions, namely true sun pointer and pointers for the five then-known planets, as proposed by Freeth and Jones, 2012. Based also upon similar drawing in the Freeth 2006 Supplement and Wright 2005, Epicycles Part 2. Proposed (as opposed to known from the artefact) gearing crosshatched.

It is very probable there were planetary dials, as the complicated motions and periodicities of all planets are mentioned in the manual of the mechanism. The exact position and mechanisms for the gears of the planets is unknown. There is no coaxial system except for the Moon. Fragment D that is an epicycloidal system, is considered as a planetary gear for Jupiter (Moussas, 2011, 2012, 2014) or a gear for the motion of the Sun (University of Thessaloniki group).

The Sun gear is operated from the hand-operated crank (connected to gear a1, driving the large four-spoked mean Sun gear, b1) and in turn drives the rest of the gear sets. The Sun gear is b1/b2 and b2 has 64 teeth. It directly drives the date/mean sun pointer (there may have been a second, "true sun" pointer that displayed the Sun's elliptical anomaly; it is discussed below in the Freeth reconstruction). In this discussion, reference is to modelled rotational period of various pointers and indicators; they all assume the input rotation of the b1 gear of 360 degrees, corresponding with one tropical year, and are computed solely on the basis of the gear ratios of the gears named.

The Moon train starts with gear b1 and proceeds through c1, c2, d1, d2, e2, e5, k1, k2, e6, e1, and b3 to the Moon pointer on the front face. The gears k1 and k2 form an epicyclic gear system; they are an identical pair of gears that do not mesh, but rather, they operate face-to-face, with a short pin on k1 inserted into a slot in k2. The two gears have different centres of rotation, so the pin must move back and forth in the slot. That increases and decreases the radius at which k2 is driven, also necessarily varying its angular velocity (presuming the velocity of k1 is even) faster in some parts of the rotation than others. Over an entire revolution the average velocities are the same, but the fast-slow variation models the effects of the elliptical orbit of the Moon, in consequence of Kepler's second and third laws. The modelled rotational period of the Moon pointer (averaged over a year) is 27.321 days, compared to the modern length of a lunar sidereal month of 27.321661 days. The pin/slot driving of the k1/k2 gears varies the displacement over a year's time, and the mounting of those two gears on the e3 gear supplies a precessional advancement to the ellipticity modelling with a period of 8.8826 years, compared with the current value of precession period of the moon of 8.85 years.

The system also models the phases of the Moon. The Moon pointer holds a shaft along its length, on which is mounted a small gear named r, which meshes to the Sun pointer at B0 (the connection between B0 and the rest of B is not visible in the original mechanism, so whether b0 is the current date/mean Sun pointer or a hypothetical true Sun pointer is unknown). The gear rides around the dial with the Moon, but is also geared to the Sun—the effect is to perform a differential gear operation, so the gear turns at the synodic month period, measuring in effect, the angle of the difference between the Sun and Moon pointers. The gear drives a small ball that appears through an opening in the Moon pointer's face, painted longitudinally half white and half black, displaying the phases pictorially. It turns with a modelled rotational period of 29.53 days; the modern value for the synodic month is 29.530589 days.

The Metonic train is driven by the drive train b1, b2, l1, l2, m1, m2, and n1, which is connected to the pointer. The modelled rotational period of the pointer is the length of the 6,939.5 days (over the whole five-rotation spiral), while the modern value for the Metonic cycle is 6,939.69 days.

The Olympiad train is driven by b1, b2, l1, l2, m1, m2, n1, n2, and o1, which mounts the pointer. It has a computed modelled rotational period of exactly four years, as expected. It is the only pointer on the mechanism that rotates anticlockwise; all of the others rotate clockwise.

The Callippic train is driven by b1, b2, l1, l2, m1, m2, n1, n3, p1, p2, and q1, which mounts the pointer. It has a computed modelled rotational period of 27,758 days, while the modern value is 27,758.8 days.

The Saros train is driven by b1, b2, l1, l2, m1, m3, e3, e4, f1, f2, and g1, which mounts the pointer. The modelled rotational period of the Saros pointer is 1,646.3 days (in four rotations along the spiral pointer track); the modern value is 1,646.33 days.

The Exeligmos train is driven by b1, b2, l1, l2, m1, m3, e3, e4, f1, f2, g1, g2, h1, h2, and i1, which mounts the pointer. The modelled rotational period of the exeligmos pointer is 19,756 days; the modern value is 19,755.96 days.

It appears gears m3, n1-3, p1-2, and q1 did not survive in the wreckage. The functions of the pointers were deduced from the remains of the dials on the back face, and reasonable, appropriate gearage to fulfill the functions was proposed and is generally accepted.

== Reconstruction efforts ==
=== Proposed gear schemes ===
Because of the large space between the mean Sun gear and the front of the case and the size of and mechanical features on the mean Sun gear, it is very likely that the mechanism contained further gearing that either has been lost in or subsequent to the shipwreck, or was removed before being loaded onto the ship. This lack of evidence and nature of the front part of the mechanism has led to attempts to emulate what the Ancient Greeks would have done and because of the lack of evidence, many solutions have been put forward over the years. But as progress has been made on analyzing the internal structures and deciphering the inscriptions, earlier models have been ruled out and better models developed.

Wright proposal

Evans et al. proposal

2012 Freeth et al. proposal

Derek J. de Solla Price built a simple model in the 1970s.

In 2002 Michael Wright designed and built the first workable model with the known mechanism and his emulation of a potential planetarium system. He suggested that along with the lunar anomaly, adjustments would have been made for the deeper, more basic solar anomaly (known as the "first anomaly"). He included pointers for this "true sun", Mercury, Venus, Mars, Jupiter, and Saturn, in addition to the known "mean sun" (current time) and lunar pointers.

Evans, Carman, and Thorndike published a solution in 2010 with significant differences from Wright's. Their proposal centred on what they observed as irregular spacing of the inscriptions on the front dial face, which to them seemed to indicate an off-centre sun indicator arrangement; this would simplify the mechanism by removing the need to simulate the solar anomaly. They suggested that rather than accurate planetary indication (rendered impossible by the offset inscriptions) there would be simple dials for each individual planet, showing information such as key events in the cycle of planet, initial and final appearances in the night sky, and apparent direction changes. This system would lead to a much simplified gear system, with much reduced forces and complexity, as compared to Wright's model.

Their proposal used simple meshed gear trains and accounted for the previously unexplained 63 toothed gear in fragment D. They proposed two face plate layouts, one with evenly spaced dials, and another with a gap in the top of the face, to account for criticism that they did not use the apparent fixtures on the b1 gear. They proposed that rather than bearings and pillars for gears and axles, they simply held weather and seasonal icons to be displayed through a window. In a paper published in 2012, Carman, Thorndike, and Evans also proposed a system of epicyclic gearing with pin and slot followers.

Freeth and Jones published a proposal in 2012. They proposed a compact and feasible solution to the question of planetary indication. They also propose indicating the solar anomaly (that is, the sun's apparent position in the zodiac dial) on a separate pointer from the date pointer, which indicates the mean position of the Sun, as well as the date on the month dial. If the two dials are synchronised correctly, their front panel display is essentially the same as Wright's. Unlike Wright's model however, this model has not been built physically, and is only a 3-D computer model.

Internal gearing relationships of the Antikythera Mechanism, based on the Freeth and Jones proposal

The system to synthesise the solar anomaly is very similar to that used in Wright's proposal: three gears, one fixed in the centre of the b1 gear and attached to the Sun spindle, the second fixed on one of the spokes (in their proposal the one on the bottom left) acting as an idle gear, and the final positioned next to that one; the final gear is fitted with an offset pin and, over said pin, an arm with a slot that in turn, is attached to the sun spindle, inducing anomaly as the mean Sun wheel turns.

The inferior planet mechanism includes the Sun (treated as a planet in this context), Mercury, and Venus. For each of the three systems, there is an epicyclic gear whose axis is mounted on b1, thus the basic frequency is the Earth year (as it is, in truth, for epicyclic motion in the Sun and all the planets—excepting only the Moon). Each meshes with a gear grounded to the mechanism frame. Each has a pin mounted, potentially on an extension of one side of the gear that enlarges the gear, but doesn't interfere with the teeth; in some cases, the needed distance between the gear's centre and the pin is farther than the radius of the gear itself. A bar with a slot along its length extends from the pin toward the appropriate coaxial tube, at whose other end is the object pointer, out in front of the front dials. The bars could have been full gears, although there is no need for the waste of metal, since the only working part is the slot. Also, using the bars avoids interference between the three mechanisms, each of which are set on one of the four spokes of b1. Thus there is one new grounded gear (one was identified in the wreckage, and the second is shared by two of the planets), one gear used to reverse the direction of the sun anomaly, three epicyclic gears and three bars/coaxial tubes/pointers, which would qualify as another gear each: five gears and three slotted bars in all.

The superior planet systems—Mars, Jupiter, and Saturn—all follow the same general principle of the lunar anomaly mechanism. Similar to the inferior systems, each has a gear whose centre pivot is on an extension of b1, and which meshes with a grounded gear. It presents a pin and a centre pivot for the epicyclic gear which has a slot for the pin, and which meshes with a gear fixed to a coaxial tube and thence to the pointer. Each of the three mechanisms can fit within a quadrant of the b1 extension, and they are thus all on a single plane parallel with the front dial plate. Each one uses a ground gear, a driving gear, a driven gear, and a gear/coaxial tube/pointer, thus, twelve gears additional in all.

In total, there are eight coaxial spindles of various nested sizes to transfer the rotations in the mechanism to the eight pointers. So in all, there are 30 original gears, seven gears added to complete calendar functionality, 17 gears and three slotted bars to support the six new pointers, for a grand total of 54 gears, three bars, and eight pointers in Freeth and Jones' design.

On the visual representation Freeth provides, the pointers on the front zodiac dial have small, round identifying stones. He refers to a quote from an ancient papyrus:

...a voice comes to you speaking. Let the stars be set upon the board in accordance with [their] nature except for the Sun and Moon. And let the Sun be golden, the Moon silver, Kronos [Saturn] of obsidian, Ares [Mars] of reddish onyx, Aphrodite [Venus] lapis lazuli veined with gold, Hermes [Mercury] turquoise; let Zeus [Jupiter] be of (whitish?) stone, crystalline (?)...

However, more recent discoveries and research have shown that the above models are not correct. In 2016, the numbers 462 and 442 were found in computed tomography scans of the inscriptions dealing with Venus and Saturn, respectively. These relate to the synodic cycles of these planets, and indicated that the mechanism was more accurate than previously thought. In 2018, based on the CT scans, the Antikythera Mechanism Research Project proposed changes in gearing and produced mechanical parts based on this.

In March 2021, the Antikythera Research Team at University College London, led by Freeth, published a new proposed reconstruction of the entire Antikythera Mechanism. They were able to find gears that could be shared among the gear-trains for the different planets, by using rational approximations for the synodic cycles which have small prime factors, with the factors 7 and 17 being used for more than one planet. They conclude that none of the previous models "are at all compatible with all the currently known data", but their model is compatible with it. Freeth has directed a video explaining the discovery of the synodic cycle periods and the conclusions about how the mechanism worked.

In 2025, one research team concluded that manufacture error in the original mechanism's gears is too great for the mechanism to have ever worked; they emphasized that the scans they used could be incorrect about the extent of imperfections.

=== Accuracy ===
Investigations by Freeth and Jones reveal their simulated mechanism is inaccurate. The Mars pointer is up to 38° wrong in some instances (these inaccuracies occur at the nodal points of Mars' retrograde motion, and the error recedes at other locations in the orbit). This is not due to inaccuracies in gearing ratios in the mechanism, but inadequacies in the Greek theory of planetary movements. The accuracy could not have been improved until c. 160 AD when Ptolemy published his Almagest (particularly by adding the concept of the equant to his theory), then much later by the introduction of Kepler's laws of planetary motion in 1609 and 1619.

In short, the Antikythera Mechanism was a machine designed to predict celestial phenomena according to the sophisticated astronomical theories current in its day, the sole witness to a lost history of brilliant engineering, a conception of pure genius, one of the great wonders of the ancient world—but it didn't really work very well!

In addition to theoretical accuracy, there is the issue of mechanical accuracy. Freeth and Jones note that the inevitable "looseness" in the mechanism due to the hand-built gears, with their triangular teeth and the frictions between gears, and in bearing surfaces, probably would have swamped the finer solar and lunar correction mechanisms built into it:

Though the engineering was remarkable for its era, recent research indicates that its design conception exceeded the engineering precision of its manufacture by a wide margin—with considerable cumulative inaccuracies in the gear trains, which would have cancelled out many of the subtle anomalies built into its design.

While the device may have struggled with inaccuracies, due to the triangular teeth being hand-made, the calculations used and technology implemented to create the elliptical paths of the planets and retrograde motion of the Moon and Mars, by using a clockwork-type gear train with the addition of a pin-and-slot epicyclic mechanism, predated that of the first known clocks found in antiquity in medieval Europe, by more than 1000 years. Archimedes' development of the approximate value of pi and his theory of centres of gravity, along with the steps he made towards developing the calculus, suggest the Greeks had enough mathematical knowledge beyond that of Babylonian algebra, to model the elliptical nature of planetary motion.

Of special delight to physicists, the Moon mechanism uses a special train of bronze gears, two of them linked with a slightly offset axis, to indicate the position and phase of the moon. As is known today from Kepler's laws of planetary motion, the moon travels at different speeds as it orbits the Earth, and this speed differential is modelled by the Antikythera Mechanism, even though the Ancient Greeks were not aware of the actual elliptical shape of the orbit.

== Similar devices in ancient literature ==
The level of refinement of the mechanism indicates that the device was not unique, and possibly required expertise built over several generations. However, such artefacts were commonly melted down for the value of the bronze and rarely survive to the present day.

=== Roman world ===
Cicero's De re publica (54–51 BC), a first century BC philosophical dialogue, mentions two machines that some modern authors consider as some kind of planetarium or orrery, predicting the movements of the Sun, the Moon, and the five planets known at that time. They were both built by Archimedes and brought to Rome by the Roman general Marcus Claudius Marcellus after the death of Archimedes at the siege of Syracuse in 212 BC. Marcellus had great respect for Archimedes and one of these machines was the only item he kept from the siege (the second was placed in the Temple of Virtue). The device was kept as a family heirloom, and Cicero has Philus (one of the participants in a conversation that Cicero imagined had taken place in a villa belonging to Scipio Aemilianus in the year 129 BC) saying that Gaius Sulpicius Gallus (consul with Marcellus's nephew in 166 BC, and credited by Pliny the Elder as the first Roman to have written a book explaining solar and lunar eclipses) gave both a "learned explanation" and a working demonstration of the device.

I had often heard this celestial globe or sphere mentioned on account of the great fame of Archimedes. Its appearance, however, did not seem to me particularly striking. There is another, more elegant in form, and more generally known, moulded by the same Archimedes, and deposited by the same Marcellus, in the Temple of Virtue at Rome. But as soon as Gallus had begun to explain, by his sublime science, the composition of this machine, I felt that the Sicilian geometrician must have possessed a genius superior to any thing we usually conceive to belong to our nature. Gallus assured us, that the solid and compact globe, was a very ancient invention, and that the first model of it had been presented by Thales of Miletus. That afterwards Eudoxus of Cnidus, a disciple of Plato, had traced on its surface the stars that appear in the sky, and that many years subsequent, borrowing from Eudoxus this beautiful design and representation, Aratus had illustrated them in his verses, not by any science of astronomy, but the ornament of poetic description. He added, that the figure of the sphere, which displayed the motions of the Sun and Moon, and the five planets, or wandering stars, could not be represented by the primitive solid globe. And that in this, the invention of Archimedes was admirable, because he had calculated how a single revolution should maintain unequal and diversified progressions in dissimilar motions. When Gallus moved this globe, it showed the relationship of the Moon with the Sun, and there were exactly the same number of turns on the bronze device as the number of days in the real globe of the sky. Thus it showed the same eclipse of the Sun as in the globe [of the sky], as well as showing the Moon entering the area of the Earth's shadow when the Sun is in line ... [missing text] [i.e. It showed both solar and lunar eclipses.]

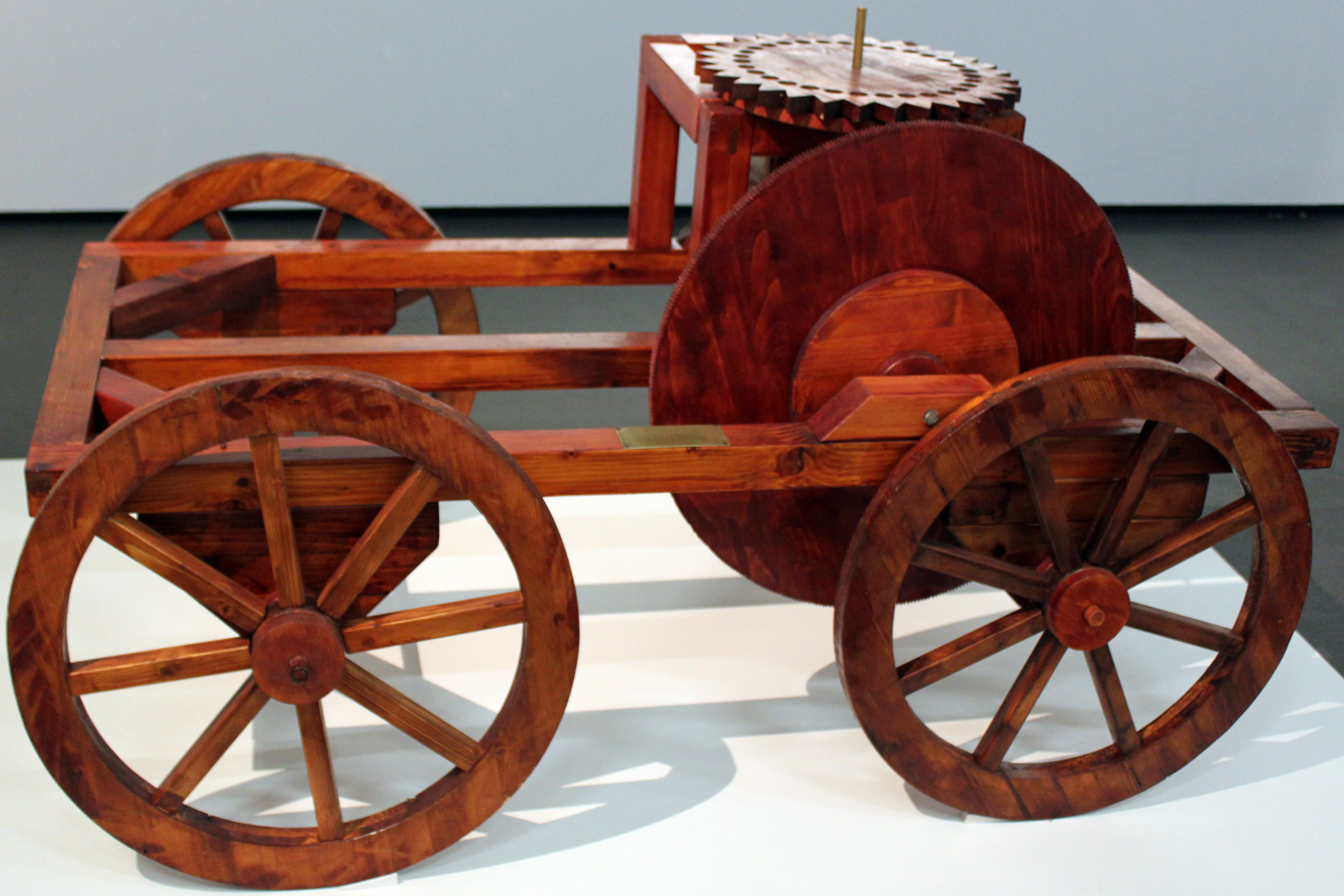
Replica of a Roman odometer. After each Roman mile, a ball drops from a gear wheel into a box with an audible signal. The total balls counted indicate the miles traveled.

Pappus of Alexandria (290 – c. 350 AD) stated that Archimedes had written a now lost manuscript on the construction of these devices titled On Sphere-Making. The surviving texts from ancient times describe many of his creations, some even containing simple drawings. One such device is his odometer, the exact model later used by the Romans to place their mile markers (described by Vitruvius, Heron of Alexandria and in the time of Emperor Commodus). The drawings in the text appeared functional, but attempts to build them as pictured had failed. When the gears pictured, which had square teeth, were replaced with gears of the type in the Antikythera mechanism, which were angled, the device was perfectly functional.

If Cicero's account is correct, then this technology existed as early as the third century BC. Archimedes' device is also mentioned by later Roman era writers such as Lactantius (Divinarum Institutionum Libri VII), Claudian (In sphaeram Archimedes), and Proclus (Commentary on the first book of Euclid's Elements of Geometry) in the fourth and fifth centuries.

Cicero also said that another such device was built "recently" by his friend Posidonius, "... each one of the revolutions of which brings about the same movement in the Sun and Moon and five wandering stars [planets] as is brought about each day and night in the heavens ..."

It is unlikely that any one of these machines was the particular Antikythera mechanism found in the shipwreck since both the devices fabricated by Archimedes and mentioned by Cicero were located in Rome at least 30 years later than the estimated date of the shipwreck, and the third device was almost certainly in the hands of Posidonius by that date. The scientists who have reconstructed the Antikythera mechanism also agree that it was too sophisticated to have been a unique device.

Other relatively complex metal devices are known from Roman Greece. For example, a bronze combination lock from the Augustan or Hadrianic period was unearthed in the Kerameikos. The device operated on a primitive form of mechanical logic: the central bolt was physically blocked from retracting until the notches of two independent rotary dials were correctly aligned. The device also included a simple concealed bypass mechanism.

=== Eastern Mediterranean and others ===
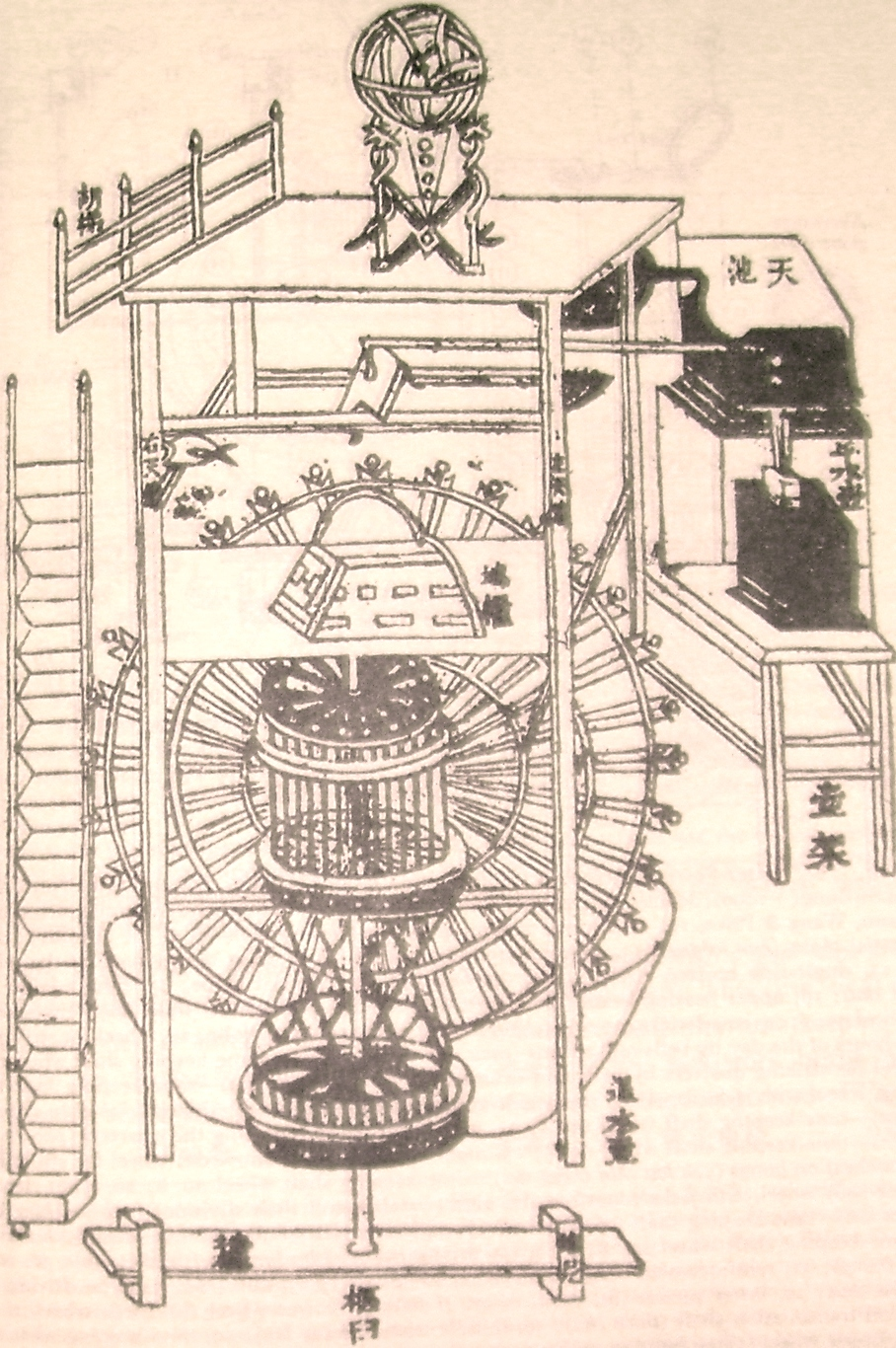
Su Song's Clock Tower

This evidence that the Antikythera mechanism was not unique adds support to the idea that there was an ancient Greek tradition of complex mechanical technology that was later, at least in part, transmitted to the Byzantine and Islamic worlds, where mechanical devices which were complex, albeit simpler than the Antikythera mechanism, were built during the Middle Ages. Fragments of a geared calendar attached to a sundial, from the fifth or sixth century Byzantine Empire, have been found; the calendar may have been used to assist in telling time. In the Islamic world, Banū Mūsā's Kitab al-Hiyal, or Book of Ingenious Devices, was commissioned by the Caliph of Baghdad in the early 9th century AD. This text described over a hundred mechanical devices, some of which may date back to ancient Greek texts preserved in monasteries. A geared calendar similar to the Byzantine device was described by the scientist al-Biruni around 1000, and a surviving 13th-century astrolabe also contains a similar clockwork device. It is possible that this medieval technology may have been transmitted to Europe and contributed to the development of mechanical clocks there.

In the 11th century, Chinese polymath Su Song constructed a mechanical clock tower that told (among other measurements) the position of some stars and planets, which were shown on a mechanically rotated armillary sphere.

== Popular culture and museum replicas ==
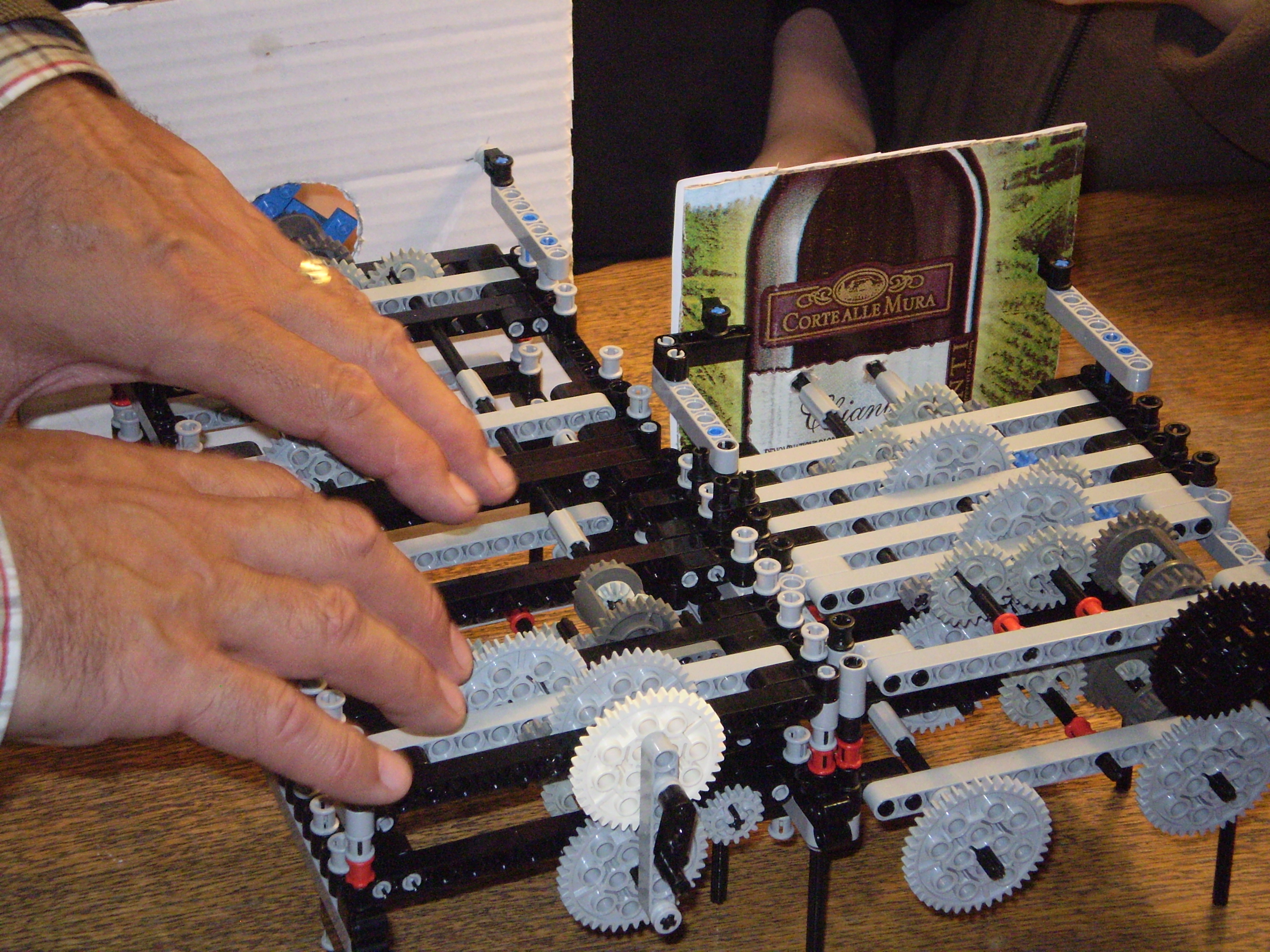
Lego Antikythera mechanism

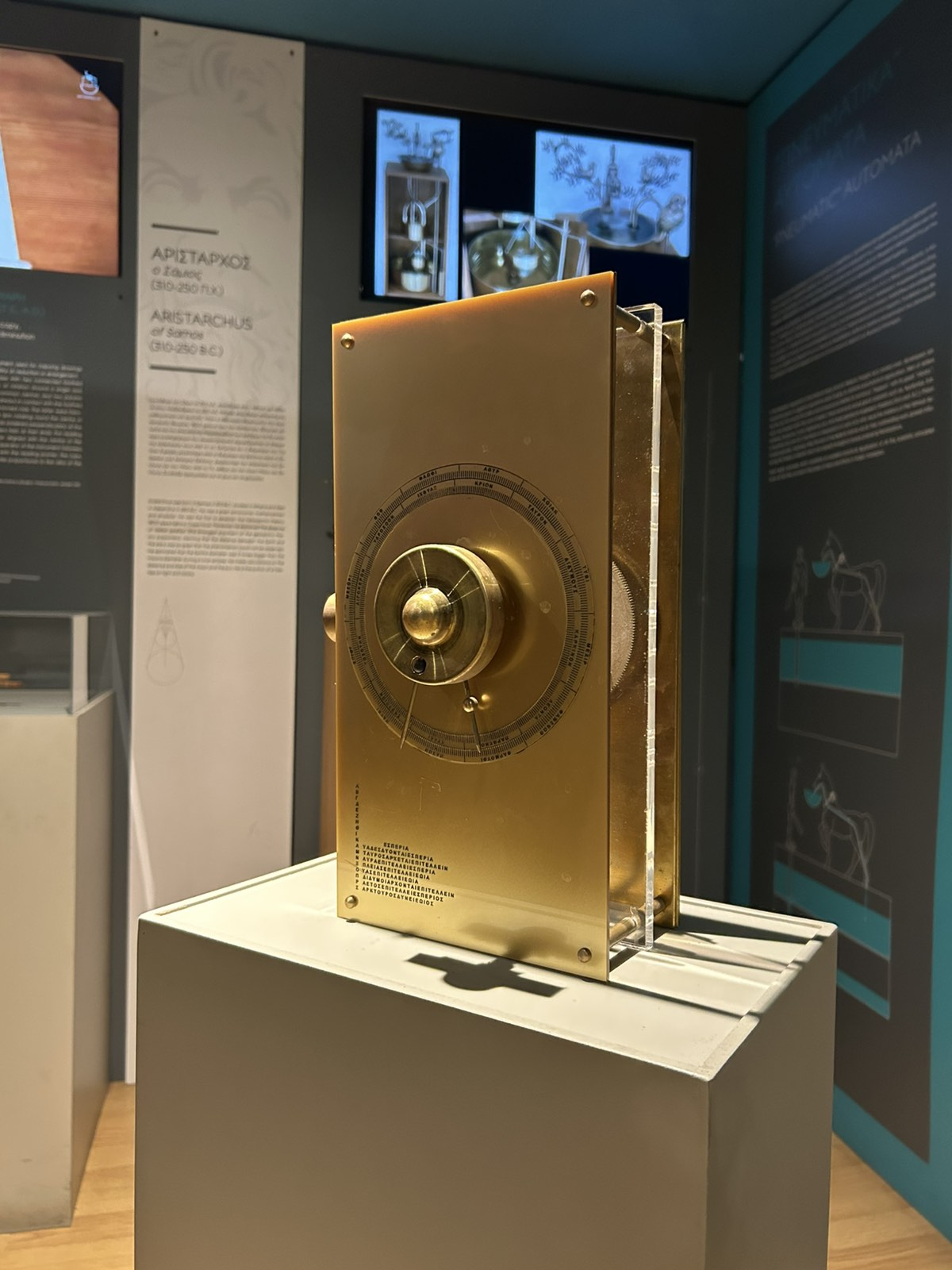
A hypothetical reconstruction of the mechanism of Antikythera at the Kotsanas Museum of Ancient Greek Technology, in Athens, Greece.

Several exhibitions have been staged worldwide, leading to the main "Antikythera shipwreck" exhibition at the National Archaeological Museum in Athens. As of 2012, the Antikythera mechanism was displayed as part of a temporary exhibition about the Antikythera shipwreck, accompanied by reconstructions made by Ioannis Theofanidis, Derek de Solla Price, Michael Wright, the Thessaloniki University and Dionysios Kriaris. Other reconstructions are on display at the American Computer Museum in Bozeman, Montana, at the Children's Museum of Manhattan in New York, at Astronomisch-Physikalisches Kabinett in Kassel, Germany, at the Archimedes Museum in Olympia, Greece, at the Kotsanas Museum of Ancient Greek Technology in Athens, at the Musée des Arts et Métiers in Paris and at the Western Australian Museum.

The National Geographic documentary series Naked Science dedicated an episode to the Antikythera Mechanism entitled "Star Clock BC" that aired on 20 January 2011. A documentary, The World's First Computer, was produced in 2012 by the Antikythera mechanism researcher and film-maker Tony Freeth. In 2012, BBC Four aired The Two-Thousand-Year-Old Computer; it was also aired on 3 April 2013 in the United States on NOVA, the PBS science series, under the name Ancient Computer. It documents the discovery and 2005 investigation of the mechanism by the Antikythera Mechanism Research Project.

A functioning Lego reconstruction of the Antikythera mechanism was built in 2010 by hobbyist Andy Carol, and featured in a short film produced by Small Mammal in 2011.

On 17 May 2017, Google marked the 115th anniversary of the discovery with a Google Doodle.

The YouTube channel Clickspring documents the creation of an Antikythera mechanism replica using the tools, techniques of machining and metallurgy, and materials that would have been available in ancient Greece, along with investigations into the possible technologies of the era.

The film Indiana Jones and the Dial of Destiny (2023) features a plot around a fictionalized version of the mechanism (also referred to as Archimedes' Dial, the titular Dial of Destiny). In the film, the device was built by Archimedes as a temporal mapping system, and sought by a former Nazi scientist as a way to detect time portals in order to travel back in time and help Germany win World War II. A major plot point revolves around the fact that the device did not take continental drift into account as the theory was unknown in Archimedes' time.

On 8 February 2024, a 10X scale replica of the mechanism was built, installed, and inaugurated at the University of Sonora in Hermosillo, Sonora, Mexico. With the name of Monumental Antikythera Mechanism for Hermosillo (MAMH), Dr. Alfonso performed the inauguration. Also attending were Durazo Montaño, Governor of Sonora and Dr. Maria Rita Plancarte Martinez, chancellor of the Universidad de Sonora, the ambassador of Greece, Nikolaos Koutrokois, and a delegation from the Embassy.

In 2024, Finnish band Nightwish's album Yesterwynde included the track "The Antikythera Mechanism". The band also partnered with Finnish watch manufacturer POOK Watches to release a limited edition watch, with elements referencing the Antikythera Mechanism.

== See also ==
- Ancient technology – Technological results from advances in engineering in ancient civilizations
- Archimedes Palimpsest – Greek parchment codex manuscript
- Astrarium – Timepiece and astronomical prediction device
- Automaton – Self-operating machine
- Ctesibius – 3rd-century BC Greek inventor and mathematician
- Out-of-place artifact – Artifacts purported to challenge historical chronology
- Reverse engineering – Process of extracting design information from anything artificial
