= London Centre for the History of Science, Medicine, and Technology =

The London Centre for the History of Science, Medicine and Technology was a partnership of two university departments in London, United Kingdom:

- Department of Science and Technology Studies, University College London
- Centre for the History of Science, Technology and Medicine, Imperial College London

Prior to 2010, it also included UCL Centre for the History of Medicine.

Its principal purpose was to deliver MSc programmes for these departments. These degrees included:

- MSc in History of Science, Medicine and Technology
- MSc in Science, Technology, Medicine and Society

The London Centre began in 1987. This partnership was dissolved and the London Centre closed in 2013 at the end of the 2012–13 academic session.
