= UCL Department of Science and Technology Studies =

Coordinates: 51.524372°N 0.131926°W

- Established: 1921
- Director: Professor Jean-Baptiste Gouyon
- Administrative staff: 21 academics 4 administrators
- Students: 80 undergraduates, 45 MScs, 30 MPhil/PhDs
- Address: 22 Gordon Square, London, WC1E 6BT, London, United Kingdom
- Website: STS UCL

The UCL Department of Science and Technology Studies (STS) is an academic department in University College London, London, England. It is part of UCL's Faculty of Mathematics and Physical Sciences. The department offers academic training at both undergraduate and graduate (MSc and MPhil/PhD) levels.

The department received its current name in 1995. It had been the "Department of History and Philosophy of Science" from 1938 to 1995, and the "Department of History and Method of Science" from 1921 to 1938.

University College London was the first UK university to offer single honours undergraduate degrees in this interdisciplinary subject, launching its BSc in history and philosophy of science in 1993. Two related BSc degrees followed shortly thereafter. At UCL, science and technology studies (abbreviated "STS") includes three specialist research clusters: "history of science," "philosophy of science," and "science, culture, and democracy". In 2022 STS accepted its first cohort for an MSc in Science Communication.

The department offices are located on UCL's campus in Gordon Square, Bloomsbury, London.
