= List of public art on Anglesey =

This is a list of public art in Anglesey, Wales. This list applies only to works of public art on permanent display in an outdoor public space and does not, for example, include artworks in museums.

Map of Wales with Anglesey highlighted

== Beaumaris ==
Image	Title / subject	Location and coordinates	Date	Artist / designer	Type	Material	Dimensions	Designation	Wikidata	Notes
	War memorial	St Mary & St Nicholas Parish Church, Beaumaris			Tapering cross	Stone		Grade II	Q29506544	

== Gwalchmai ==
Image	Title / subject	Location and coordinates	Date	Artist / designer	Type	Material	Dimensions	Designation	Wikidata	Notes
	War memorial clock tower	Gwalchmai	1926	John Griffiths, mason & TR Williams, sculptor	Clock tower	Stone		Grade II	Q29497848	

== Holyhead ==
Image	Title / subject	Location and coordinates	Date	Artist / designer	Type	Material	Dimensions	Designation	Wikidata	Notes
	Captain John Macgregor Skinner monument	Turkey Shore Road	c.1830s		Obelisk					
More images	Clock Tower	Holyhead Clock Tower	1878	Clock by Joyce of Whitchurch	Clock Tower			Grade II	Q29492555	Built to mark the completion of the harbour extension.
More images	War memorial	Victoria Square, Holyhead	1923	Louis Frederick Roslyn	Cenotaph	Granite with bronze reliefs & panels	4.8m high	Grade II	Q29492569	
	American aircrew memorial	Breakwater Country Park, Holyhead	1993		Plaque & aircraft propeller blade					
	Sculpture	Celtic Gateway approach, Holyhead	2006	Howard Boycott & Menna Elfyn	Two-part sculpture	Slate				
	Dutch navy memorial	Overlooking Newry Beach, Holyhead	2014		Sculpture group	Stone, bronze & wood				
	Market Cross	Market Square, Holyhead			Celtic cross	Stone				

== Llanddaniel Fab ==
Image	Title / subject	Location and coordinates	Date	Artist / designer	Type	Material	Dimensions	Designation	Wikidata	Notes
	War memorial	Llanddaniel Fab			Monolith	Stone	2m high			

== Llanfairpwll ==
Image	Title / subject	Location and coordinates	Date	Artist / designer	Type	Material	Dimensions	Designation	Wikidata	Notes
More images	Marquess of Anglesey's Column	Llanfairpwll	Column 1817; sculpture 1860.	Thomas Harrison, architect; Matthew Noble, sculptor.	Statue and column	Brass and marble	27m high	Grade II*	Q17742135	
	Britannia Bridge builders' memorial	Church of St Mary, Llanfairpwll	1850		Obelisk on octagonal plinth	Limestone		Grade II	Q29497041	
More images	Lord Nelson	Llanfairpwll	1873	Lord Clarence Paget	Statue on pedestal	Concrete		Grade II	Q29484923	
	War memorial	Llanfairpwll	1932	Robert Pierce	Clock tower	Granite	8m high	Grade II		

== Llanfechell ==
Image	Title / subject	Location and coordinates	Date	Artist / designer	Type	Material	Dimensions	Designation	Wikidata	Notes
More images	War memorial	Llanfechell	1920	John Griffiths	Clock tower with statue	Granite		Grade II	Q29502127	

== Llangefni ==
Image	Title / subject	Location and coordinates	Date	Artist / designer	Type	Material	Dimensions	Designation	Wikidata	Notes
More images	Rayner Memorial Clock Tower	Bulkeley Square, Llangefni	1902	John Douglas	Clock tower	Limestone		Grade II	Q7299325	
	Llangefni Grammar School 1914–18 war memorial	Former County School grounds, now Pencraig Technical College, Llangefni	1921	WF Brindle, HH Williams & John Griffiths	Statue on pedestal	Stone	5.5m high			
	Llangefni war memorial	The Shire Hall, Llangefni	1922	WF Brindle, HH Williams & John Griffiths	Obelisk on pedestal & plinth		6.5m high			

== Llanrhyddlad ==
Image	Title / subject	Location and coordinates	Date	Artist / designer	Type	Material	Dimensions	Designation	Wikidata	Notes
	War memorial	Llanrhyddlad	1921	Richard Hall, Mr Price, Mr H Williams	Statue on plinth	White marble statue with black marble panels on stone			Q59473481	Originally surmounted by an urn which was replaced by a statue after WWII.

== Marian-glas ==
Image	Title / subject	Location and coordinates	Date	Artist / designer	Type	Material	Dimensions	Designation	Wikidata	Notes
	War memorial	Marian-glas			Celtic cross on plinth	Stone			Q59772627	

== Menai Bridge ==
Image	Title / subject	Location and coordinates	Date	Artist / designer	Type	Material	Dimensions	Designation	Wikidata	Notes
	War memorial	St Tysillo's Church, Church Island	c.1921	Harold Hughes	Celtic cross on plinth	Granite	5.8m high	Grade II	Q29496047	

== Moelfre ==
Image	Title / subject	Location and coordinates	Date	Artist / designer	Type	Material	Dimensions	Designation	Wikidata	Notes
	Royal Charter memorial	St Gallgo's Church, Llanallgo			Obelisk on pedestal & plinth	Granite		Grade II	Q29503113	
	World War II memorial	Lifeboat Station, Moelfre			Headstone	Stone				
	Royal Charter memorial	Moelfre	1985		Monolith	Stone				
	Dic Evans memorial	Moelfre	2004	Sam Holland	Statue on plinth with surrounding wall	Bronze and granite	2.1m high			
	Royal Charter memorial	Seawatch Centre, Moelfre	2009	Sam Holland	Two deep relief panels	Bronze on stone				

== Myndd y Garn ==
Image	Title / subject	Location and coordinates	Date	Artist / designer	Type	Material	Dimensions	Designation	Wikidata	Notes
	Sir William Thomas monument	Mynydd y Garn	1897		Obelisk on pedestal & plinth	Stone				William Thomas was a High Sheriff of Anglesey.

== Rhosybol ==
Image	Title / subject	Location and coordinates	Date	Artist / designer	Type	Material	Dimensions	Designation	Wikidata	Notes
More images	War memorial	Rhosybol	1925		Clock tower	Stone			Q55332931	

== Valley ==
Image	Title / subject	Location and coordinates	Date	Artist / designer	Type	Material	Dimensions	Designation	Wikidata	Notes
	War memorial	Ynys Wen Cemetery, Valley	1997		Cairn	Stone	1.2m high		Q59473857	

== Ynys Llanddwyn ==
Image	Title / subject	Location and coordinates	Date	Artist / designer	Type	Material	Dimensions	Designation	Wikidata	Notes
	The White Cross	Ynys Llanddwyn	1903		Cross	Stone and cement				Marks the site of St Dwynwen's Church.
	Monument to Dwynwen	Ynys Llanddwyn	1904		Celtic cross	Stone				
