= The Uncommercial Traveller =

Collection by Charles Dickens

The Uncommercial Traveller is a collection of literary sketches and reminiscences written by Charles Dickens, published in 1860–1861.

In 1859 Dickens founded a new journal called All the Year Round, and the "Uncommercial Traveller" articles would be among his main contributions. He seems to have chosen the title and persona of the Uncommercial Traveller as a result of a speech he gave on 22 December 1859 to the Commercial Travellers' School in London, in his role as honorary chairman and treasurer. The persona sits well with a writer who liked to travel, not only as a tourist, but also to research and report what he found visiting Europe, America and giving book readings throughout Britain. He did not seem content to rest late in his career when he had attained wealth and comfort and continued travelling locally, walking the streets of London in the mould of the flâneur, a "gentleman stroller of city streets". He often suffered from insomnia and his night-time wanderings gave him an insight into some of the hidden aspects of Victorian London, details of which he also incorporated into his novels.

== Stories ==
The role of the explorer and investigator of interesting things was explained by Dickens in the introduction to the work:

Allow me to introduce myself – first negatively.

No landlord is my friend and brother, no chambermaid loves me, no waiter worships me, no boots admires and envies me. No round of beef or tongue or ham is expressly cooked for me, no pigeon-pie is especially made for me, no hotel-advertisement is personally addressed to me, no hotel-room tapestried with great-coats and railway wrappers is set apart for me, no house of public entertainment in the United Kingdom greatly cares for my opinion of its brandy or sherry. When I go upon my journeys, I am not usually rated at a low figure in the bill; when I come home from my journeys, I never get any commission. I know nothing about prices, and should have no idea, if I were put to it, how to wheedle a man into ordering something he doesn't want. As a town traveller, I am never to be seen driving a vehicle externally like a young and volatile pianoforte van, and internally like an oven in which a number of flat boxes are baking in layers. As a country traveller, I am rarely to be found in a gig, and am never to be encountered by a pleasure train, waiting on the platform of a branch station, quite a Druid in the midst of a light Stonehenge of samples.

And yet – proceeding now, to introduce myself positively – I am both a town traveller and a country traveller, and am always on the road. Figuratively speaking, I travel for the great house of Human Interest Brothers, and have rather a large connection in the fancy goods way. Literally speaking, I am always wandering here and there from my rooms in Covent-garden, London – now about the city streets: now, about the country by-roads – seeing many little things, and some great things, which, because they interest me, I think may interest others.

These are my chief credentials as the Uncommercial Traveller.

Dickens began by writing seventeen episodes, which were printed in All the Year Round between 28 January and 13 October 1860 and these were published in a single edition in 1861. He sporadically produced eleven more articles between 1863–65 and an expanded edition of the work was printed in 1866. Once more he returned to the persona with some more sketches written 1868–69 and a complete set of these articles was published posthumously in 1875.

The work is not markedly different from articles he contributed to Household Words, an earlier journal, or the contents of Sketches by Boz written near the start of his literary career. They display his wit, humour and occasionally his righteous indignation towards the things that he saw. There is simple reportage, such as an investigation into a shipload of members of the Church of Jesus Christ of Latter-day Saints ready to emigrate in "Bound for the Great Salt Lake", but more usually it is the inventive and embroidered descriptions of everyday London life: "The City of the Absent", "City of London Churches", "Shy Neighbourhoods". There are character sketches such as "Tramps", and excuses for Dickens to retell stories he has previously told, such as "The Italian Prisoner" and "Chambers". There is also Dickens's characteristic concern for the conditions of the poor and oppressed, as in "Wapping Workhouse", "A Small Star in the East" and "Titbull's Alms-Houses".

== Royal Charter storm ==
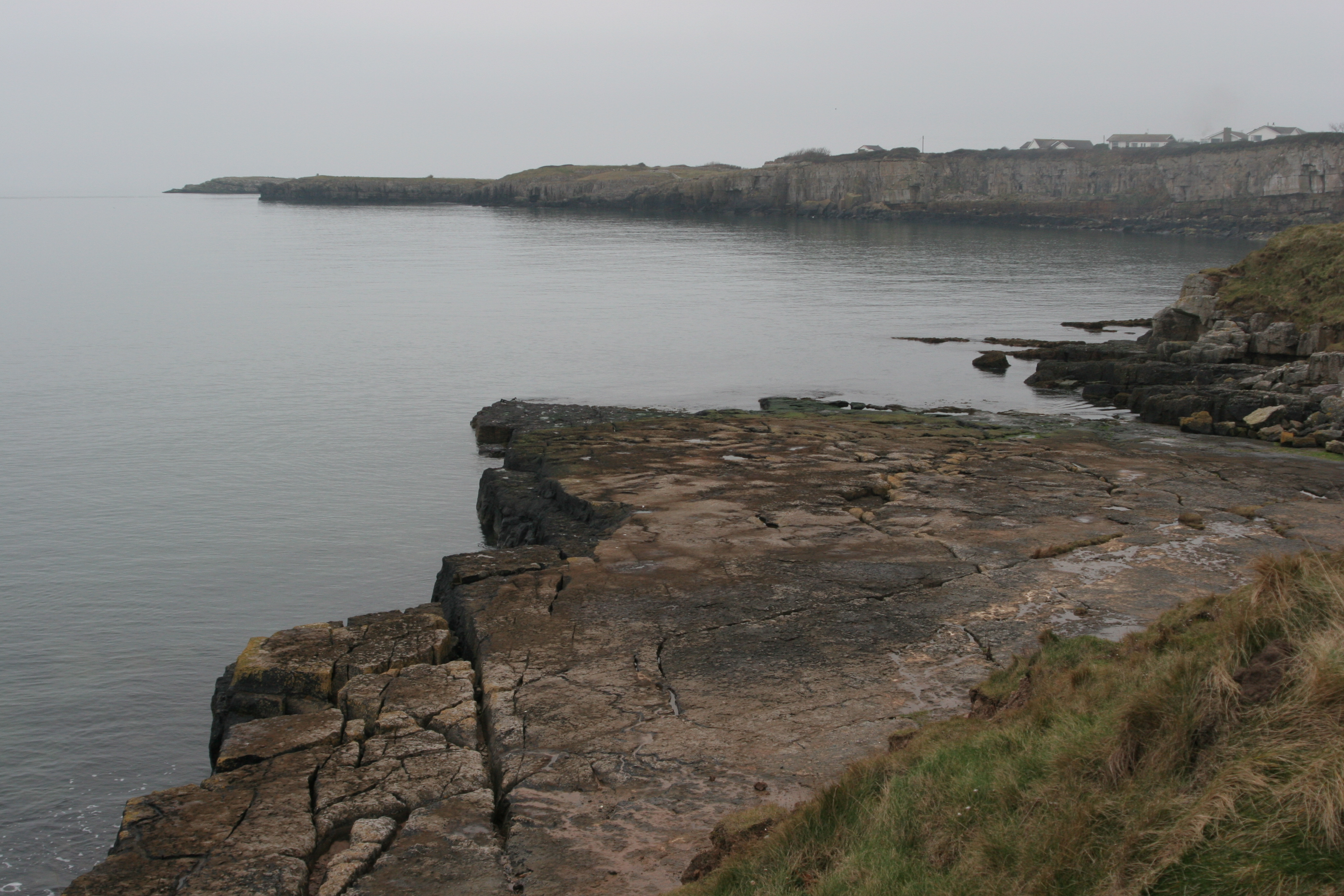
The Royal Charter broke up on these rocks near Moelfre

The second chapter describes the results of a visit he made to Anglesey in 1859 to investigate the wreck of the Royal Charter, a ship returning from Australia. It was forced onto the rocks in a severe storm in October 1859 – a storm which wrecked many other ships and has become known as the Royal Charter Storm. The Royal Charter was driven ashore on the east coast of Anglesey just north of the village of Moelfre in the early hours of the morning of the 26th, eventually being smashed to pieces against the rocks, with the loss of over 450 lives. Dickens visited the scene and talked to the rector of Llanallgo church, the Rev. Stephen Roose Hughes, whose exertions in finding and identifying the bodies probably led to his own premature death soon afterwards. Dickens gives a vivid illustration of the force of the gale:

So tremendous had the force of the sea been when it broke the ship, that it had beaten one great ingot of gold, deep into a strong and heavy piece of her solid iron-work: in which also several loose sovereigns that the ingot had swept in before it, had been found, as firmly embedded as though the iron had been liquid when they were forced there.

== Chatham ==
Of particular interest are the elements of autobiography Dickens includes such as his reminiscences and opinions on his childhood home town, Chatham, under the name Dullborough. He also describes the period of enforced inactivity – "A Fly-Leaf in Life" – he was forced to endure after a collapse due to a hectic schedule of public readings. In "Nurse's Stories"' he revealed that the stories told him by his nurse when he was a child were one of the sources of his story-telling talents and his love of ghost stories.
