= Royal Charter (ship) =

Steam clipper wrecked off Anglesey, UK

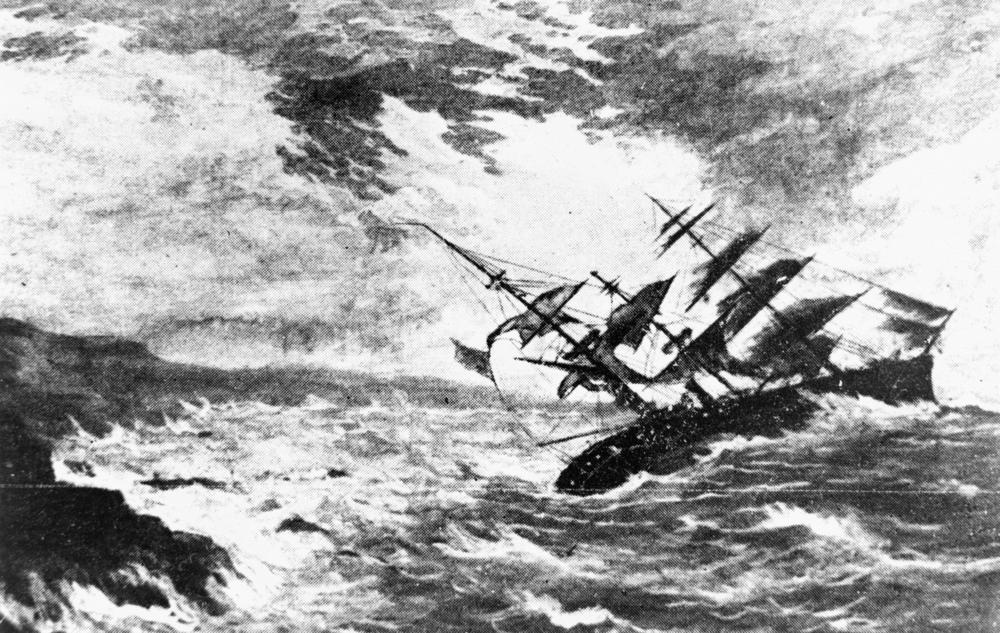
- The Royal Charter sank in an 1859 storm, stimulating the establishment of modern weather forecasting.

History

United Kingdom
- Name: Royal Charter
- Owner: Liverpool & Australian Steamship Navigation Company
- Builder: Sandycroft Ironworks, River Dee, Deeside, Wales, UK
- Launched: 1855
- Fate: Wrecked on 25 October 1859 at 53°22′17″N 4°15′20″W

General characteristics
- Class & type: Steam clipper
- Tonnage: 2,719 GRT
- Length: 326 ft (99 m)
- Beam: 39 ft (12 m)
- Depth of hold: 23 ft (7.0 m)
- Installed power: 200 nhp
- Propulsion: One boiler; Direct acting steam trunk engine; One propeller

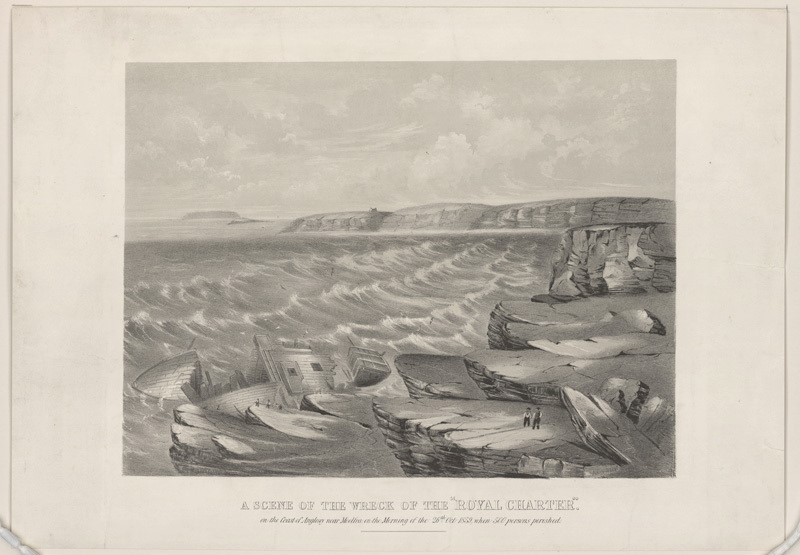
Scene of the shipwreck

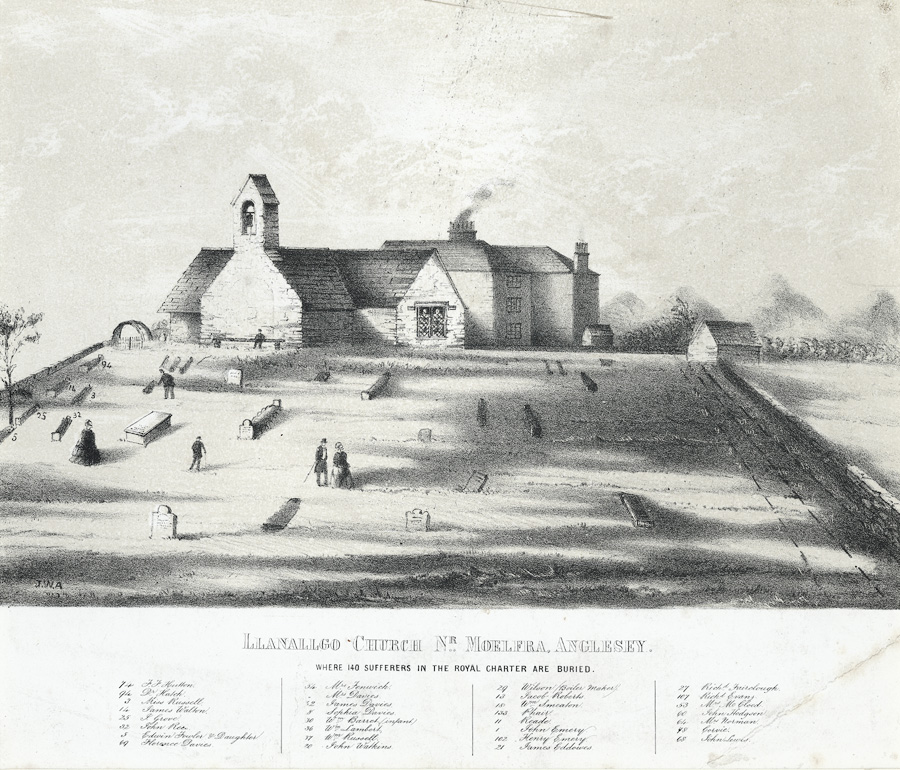
St Gallgo's Church, showing graves. Black and white print on lithograph c. 1860.

Royal Charter was a steam clipper which was wrecked off the beach of Porth Helaeth in Dulas Bay on the northeast coast of Anglesey, Wales on 26 October 1859. About 450 people died, the highest death toll of any shipwreck on the Welsh coast. The precise number of dead is uncertain as the complete passenger list was lost in the wreck, although an incomplete list (not including those who boarded just before departure) is retained in the Victorian Archives Centre in Victoria, Australia. The Royal Charter was the most prominent among about 200 ships wrecked by the Royal Charter Storm.

The Royal Charter was built at the Sandycroft Ironworks on the River Dee and was launched in 1855. She was a new type of ship, a 2,719-ton iron-hulled steam clipper, built in the same way as a clipper ship but with auxiliary coal-fired steam engines which could be used in the absence of suitable winds. The Royal Charter had three clipper masts and a single funnel.

The ship was used on the route from Liverpool to Australia, mainly as a passenger ship although there was room for some cargo. There was room for up to 600 passengers, with luxury accommodation in the first class.

== Wreck ==
The Royal Charter's maiden voyage was from Liverpool to Melbourne. The voyage was made in 52 days beating the previous record by 13 days.

In late October 1859 Royal Charter was returning to Liverpool from Melbourne. Her complement of about 371 passengers, with a crew of about 112 and some other company employees, included many gold miners, some of whom had struck it rich at the diggings in Australia and were carrying large sums of gold about their persons. A consignment of 79,000 ounces of gold bullion was loaded onto the ship. As she reached the north-western tip of Anglesey on 25 October the barometer reading was dropping and it was claimed later by some passengers, though not confirmed, that the master, Captain Thomas Taylor, was advised to put into Holyhead harbour for shelter. However, he decided to continue on to Liverpool.

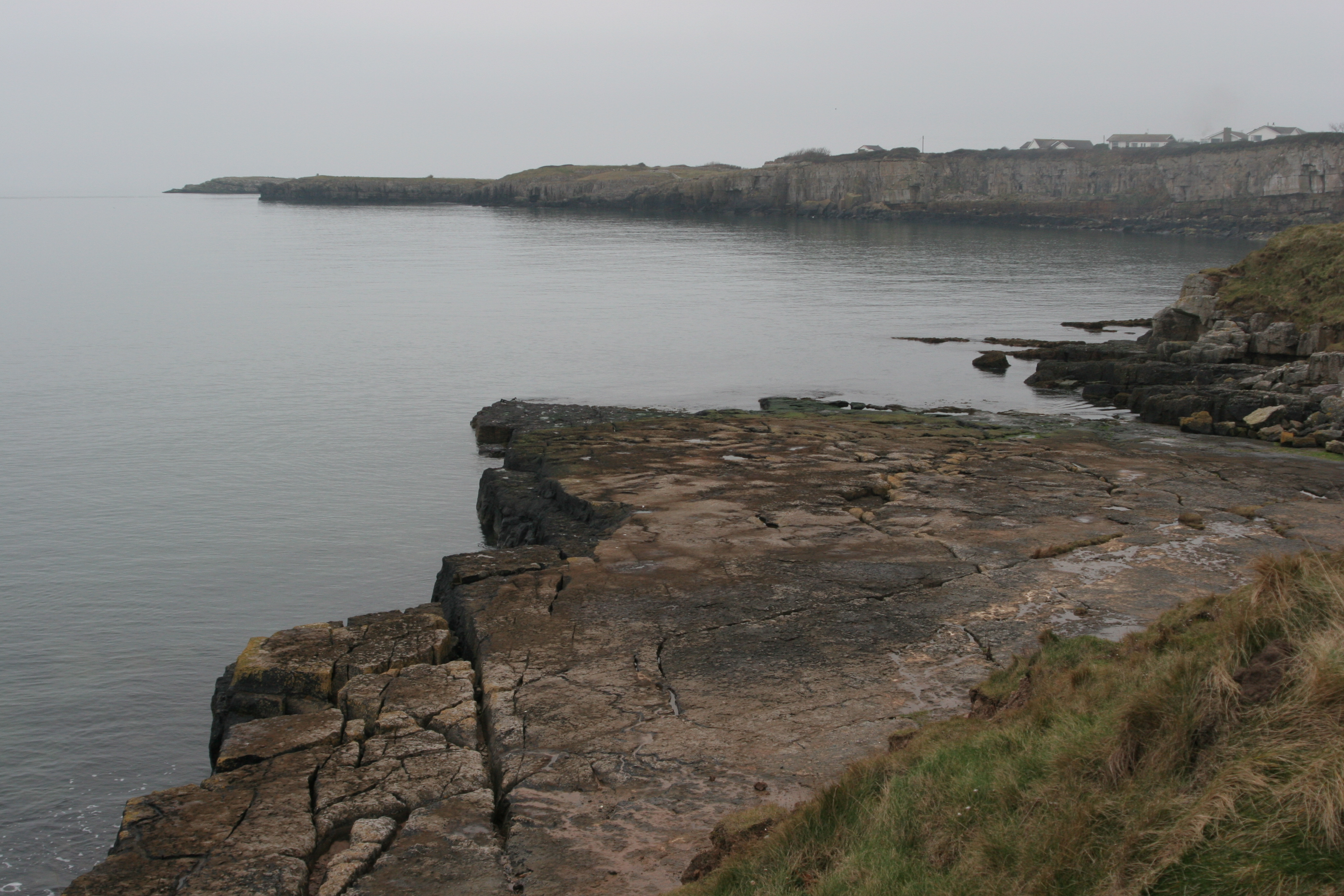
The Royal Charter broke up on these rocks near Moelfre

Off Point Lynas Royal Charter tried to pick up the Liverpool pilot, but the wind had now risen to Storm force 10 on the Beaufort scale and the rapidly rising sea made this impossible. During the night of 25/26 October the wind rose to Hurricane force 12 on the Beaufort Scale in what became known as the "Royal Charter Storm".

As the wind rose its direction changed from east to northeast and then north northeast, driving the ship towards the northeast coast of Anglesey. At 11 pm she anchored, but at 1.30 am on the 26th the port anchor chain snapped, followed by the starboard chain an hour later. Despite cutting the masts to reduce the drag of the wind, Royal Charter was driven inshore, with the steam engines unable to make headway against the gale.

The ship initially grounded on a sandbank, but in the early morning of the 26th the rising tide drove her on to the rocks at a point just north of Moelfre at Porth Helaeth on the north coast of Anglesey. Battered against the rocks by huge waves whipped up by winds of over 100 mph (160 km/h), she quickly broke up.

One member of the crew managed to swim ashore with a line, enabling a few people to be rescued, and a few others were able to struggle to shore through the surf. Most of the passengers and crew, a total of over 450 people, died. Many of them were killed by being dashed against the rocks by the waves rather than drowned. Others were said to have drowned, weighed down by the belts of gold they were wearing around their bodies. The survivors, 21 passengers and 18 crew members, were all men, with no women or children saved.

A list of 320 passenger names departing from Melbourne in August 1859 on the Royal Charter is available on-line from the Public Records Office, Victoria: "Index to Outward Passengers to Interstate, UK and Foreign Ports, 1852–1901".

A large quantity of gold was said to have been thrown up on the beach at Porth Helaeth, with some families becoming rich overnight. The gold bullion being carried as cargo was insured for £322,000, but the total value of the gold on the ship must have been much higher as many of the passengers had considerable sums in gold, either on their bodies or deposited in the ship's strongroom. Many of the bodies recovered from the sea were buried nearby at St Gallgo's Church, Llanallgo, where the graves and a memorial can still be seen. There is also a memorial on the cliff above the rocks where the ship struck, which is on the Anglesey Coastal Path.

At the time of the disaster there were allegations that local residents were becoming rich from the spoils of the wreck or exploiting grieving relatives of the victims, and the "Moelfre Twenty-Eight" who had been involved in the rescue attempts sent a letter to The Times trying to set the record straight and refute the accusations.

Exactly a century later (to the day) in October 1959 another ship, the Hindlea, struck the rocks in almost the same spot in another gale. This time there was a different outcome, with the Moelfre lifeboat under its coxswain, Richard Evans, succeeding in saving the crew.

== Aftermath ==
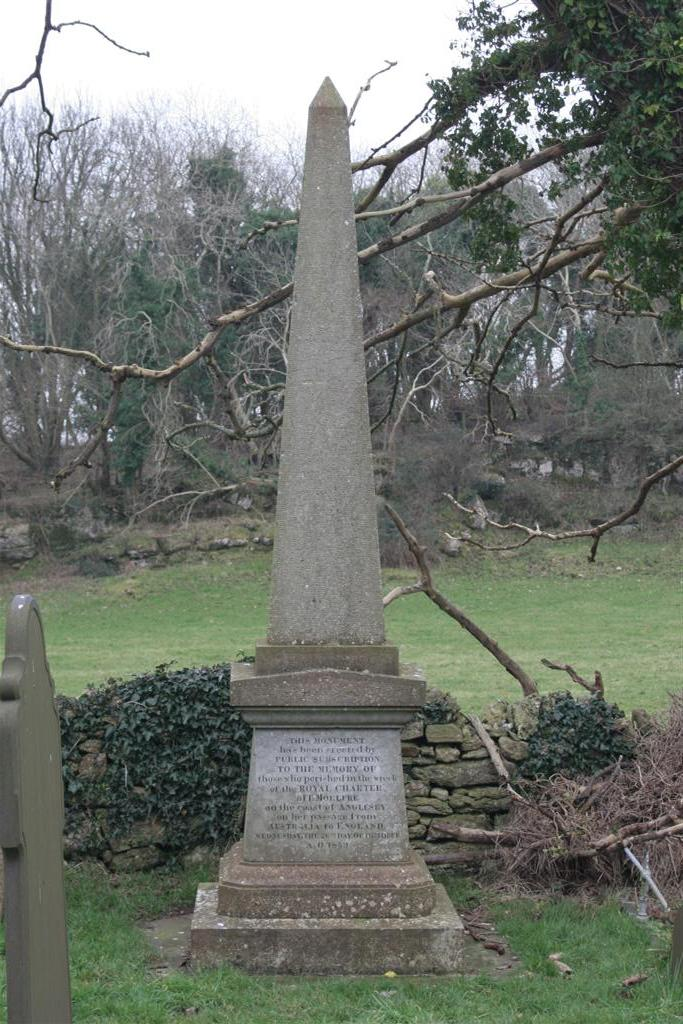
The Royal Charter Memorial in the churchyard of St Gallgo's Church, Llanallgo

The aftermath of the disaster is described by Charles Dickens in The Uncommercial Traveller. Dickens visited the scene and talked to the rector of Llanallgo, the Rev. Stephen Roose Hughes, whose exertions in finding and identifying the bodies probably led to his own premature death soon afterwards. Dickens gives a vivid illustration of the force of the gale:

"So tremendous had the force of the sea been when it broke the ship, that it had beaten one great ingot of gold, deep into a strong and heavy piece of her solid iron-work: in which also several loose sovereigns that the ingot had swept in before it, had been found, as firmly embedded as though the iron had been liquid when they were forced there."

A Volunteer by Henry Nelson O'Neil, 1860

Dickens's friend, the painter Henry O'Neil exhibited the picture A Volunteer in 1860, based on the incident, depicting Rogers about to leap into the sea with the rope around him.

The disaster had an effect on the development of the Meteorological Office as Captain Robert FitzRoy, who was in charge of the office at the time, brought in the first gale warning service to prevent similar tragedies. The intensity of the "Royal Charter storm" and winds were frequently used as a yardstick in other national disasters – when the Tay Bridge collapsed in 1879 the Astronomer Royal referred to the Royal Charter storm frequently in his report.

The wreck was extensively salvaged shortly after the disaster. The remains today lie close inshore in less than 5 metres (16 ft) of water as a series of iron bulkheads, plates and ribs which become covered and uncovered by the shifting sands from year to year. Gold sovereigns, pistols, spectacles and other personal items have been found by scuba divers by chance over the years. Teams have air-lifted, water-dredged and metal-detected for other treasure as late as 2012.

== Britain's largest gold nugget ==
Vincent Thurkettle, a prospector from Norfolk, found in 2012 what is Britain's biggest gold nugget while scouring the waters just off Anglesey. He kept his find secret until early May 2016 as he and friends continued to search for other debris from Royal Charter. He found the 97-gram (3.4 oz) nugget in water about five metres (16 ft) deep, about five metres (16 ft) from the shore. The nugget was about 40 metres (130 ft) from the site of Royal Charter's wreck, so Thurkettle had to notify the Receiver of Wreck, who took possession of it on behalf of the Crown. Recent storms had exposed seabed that had lain under two metres (6 ft 7 in) of sand.

== Cultural references ==
American folk singer Tom Russell recorded a song about the wreck of the Royal Charter, "Isaac Lewis" on the 2003 album Modern Art. American folksingers William Pint and Felicia Dale covered the song "Isaac Lewis" on their 2017 album Midnight on the Sea. Charles Dickens, in the first chapter (‘The Shipwreck’) of his collection of writings entitled ‘The Uncommercial Traveller’ recounts a visit he made, two months after the tragedy, to the coast of Wales off which the shipwreck occurred.

The Royal Charter public house in Shotton, Flintshire was named after the vessel.
