= Royal National Lifeboat Institution =

Rescue charity operating in Britain and Ireland

- Abbreviation: RNLI
- Formation: 4 March 1824; 202 years ago
- Type: Life savers
- Legal status: Registered charity
- Headquarters: Poole, Dorset, England
- Region served: United Kingdom; Ireland; Channel Islands; Isle of Man
- Patron: King Charles III
- President: Prince Edward, Duke of Kent
- Chief executive: Peter Sparkes
- Main organ: The Lifeboat
- Budget: £173.2 million (2024)
- Staff: 2,849 (2024)
- Volunteers: More than 8,800 (2024)
- Website: rnli.org

The Royal National Lifeboat Institution (RNLI) is the largest of the lifeboat services operating around the coasts of the United Kingdom, Ireland, the Channel Islands, and the Isle of Man, as well as on some inland waterways.

Founded in 1824 as the National Institution for the Preservation of Life from Shipwreck, it soon afterwards became the Royal National Institution for the Preservation of Life from Shipwreck because of the patronage of King George IV. Royal patronage has continued up to the present day with King Charles III. The organisation changed its name to the Royal National Lifeboat Institution on 5 October 1854 and was granted a royal charter in 1860.

The RNLI is a charity based in Poole, Dorset. It is principally funded by legacies (65%) and donations (30%). Most of its lifeboat crews are unpaid volunteers. They operate more than 400 lifeboats from 238 stations. Paid lifeguards provide services at nearly 250 beaches. The RNLI also provides free safety advice to many different groups of people, and has been involved in international cooperation since 1924.

== History ==
Shipwrecks on the coast of the Isle of Man in 1822 inspired local resident and philanthropist William Hillary to "appeal to the British nation" to establish "a national institution for the preservation of life and property from shipwreck". Initially he received little response from the Admiralty, however George Hibbert, a merchant, and Thomas Wilson, a Member of Parliament, helped to bring support from some influential people including King George IV and other royalty, leading politicians and merchants. A public meeting was convened at the London Tavern on 4 March 1824, chaired by the Archbishop of Canterbury. A resolution was passed to form the National Institution for the Preservation of Life from Shipwreck. King George IV gave approval for the word "Royal" to be added to the title on 20 March 1824, thus becoming the Royal National Institution for the Preservation of Life from Shipwreck. The Institution's first president was Prime Minister Robert Jenkinson, 2nd Earl of Liverpool.

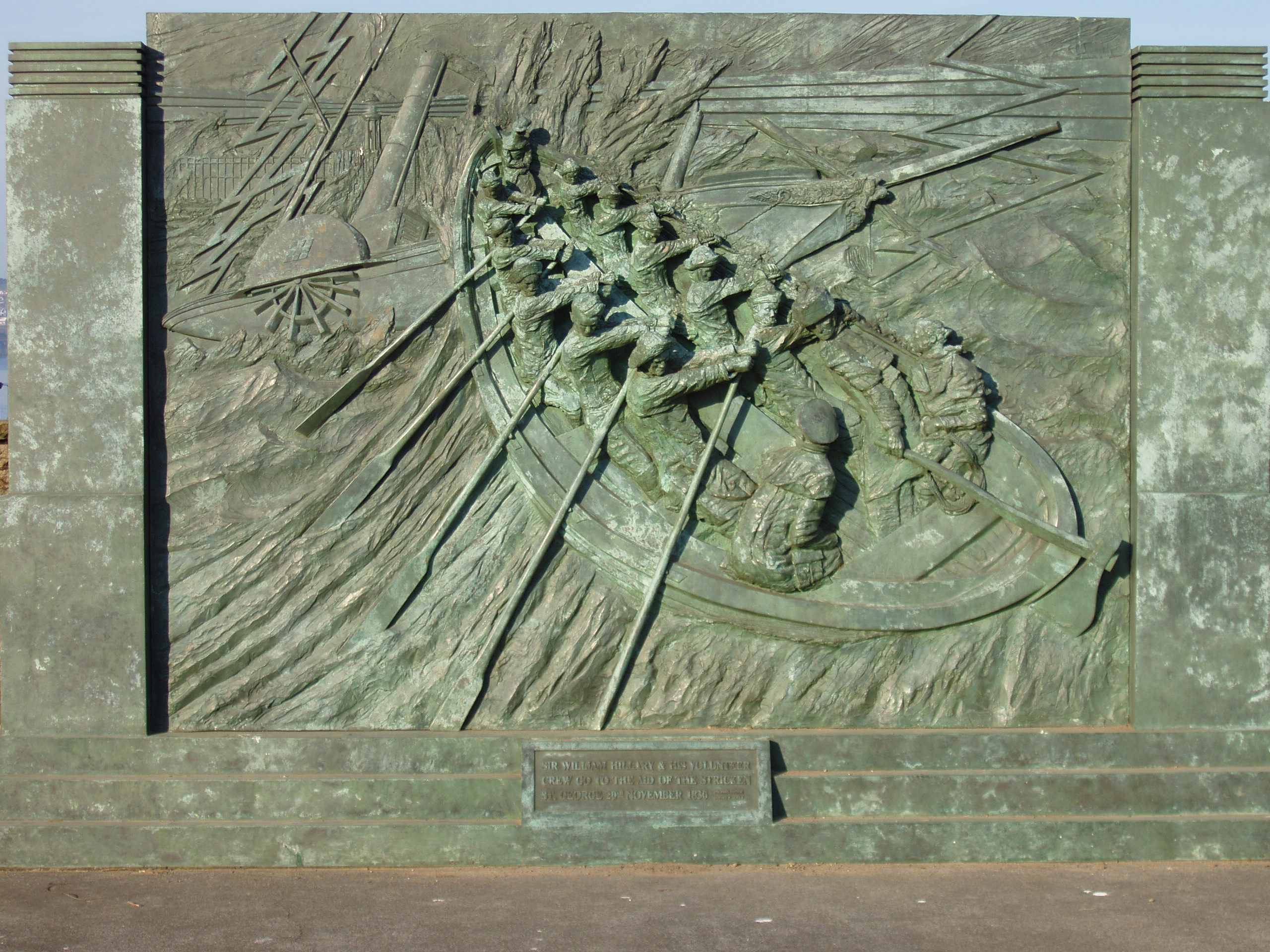
Memorial in Douglas, Isle of Man to the lifeboat rescue of the sailors from the St George in 1830

The institution's committee set itself three objectives:

1. To award medals and/or cash to those involved in rescuing people from shipwrecks.
2. To provide Captain Manby's line-throwing mortars to all coastguard and lifeboat stations.
3. To provide lifeboats to as many places on the coast as possible.

A committee was formed to examine different types of lifeboats. An 'unimmergible' based on a 1785 patent by Lionel Lukin continued to be built but was heavy and expensive. A lighter boat designed by George Palmer became the standard design until the 1850s.

In 1824, the year it was founded, the RNIPLS raised £9,706 but the funds soon dwindled. By 1835 annual income was down to just £806 and during the 1840s no appeals were made to the public for new funds.

=== Financial improvement ===
By 1850, annual income had dropped to £354, but a new committee then started to turn around the Institution and appointed Richard Lewis as Secretary. Over the next 33 years he travelled around the country and used his skills to increase the funds: by 1859 annual receipts had climbed to over £10,000 and by 1882 they reached £43,117.

Other changes saw 4th Duke of Northumberland's appointed the president in 1851 while well-meaning dukes and archbishops on the committee were replaced by experienced naval officers who brought more rigour to its operations. Captain John Ross Ward was appointed Inspector of Lifeboats and was responsible for the design and introduction of cork lifejackets for lifeboat volunteers.

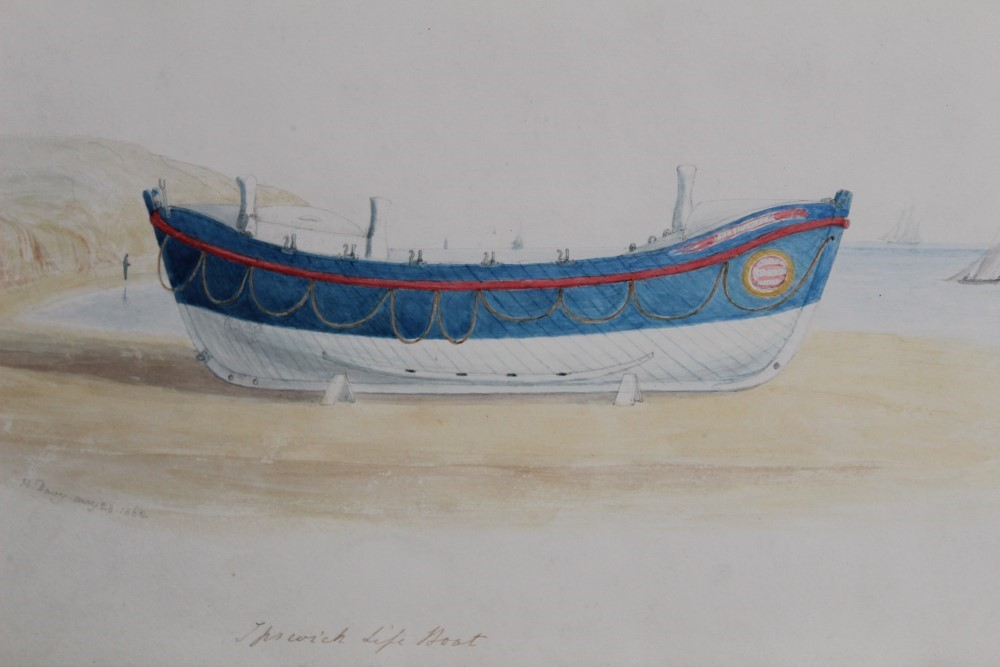
RNLB Ipswich, a standard Peake-class lifeboat built in 1862

The Duke of Northumberland instigated a competition to design a "pulling and sailing" lifeboat that could use both oars and sails so they operated further from their stations. 280 entries were received and the self-righter by James Beeching considered the best but James Peake, a master shipwright at the Royal Woolwich Dockyard, was asked by the RNLI to develop the design further in 1851. Peake-designed lifeboats and improved versions were the preferred choice for both new and replacement boats at most stations until the 1890s and beyond.

The lifeboats operated by other local committees under the Duke of Northumberland were transferred to the RNIPLS and in 1854 an arrangement was made with the Shipwrecked Fishermen and Mariners' Benevolent Society (SFMBS). The RNIPLS would concentrate on saving lives while the SFMBS would look after people who were rescued and brought ashore. This saw the RNIPLS drop the word 'shipwreck' from its name, and the SFMBS transfer its lifeboats to what would now be known as the RNLI. The RNLI was still underfunded so accepted an annual government subsidy of £2,000, but this resulted in the Board of Trade having say in the RNLI's operations. By 1869, they no longer needed to rely on the government subsidy so terminated the agreement.

Although the lifeboats were built by commercial boatbuilders, the RNLI had a need to supply stores and replace worn out or damaged equipment. This included reserve lifeboats and carriages. A depot for this was established at Poplar, London in 1882.

The loss of 27 lifeboat crew from Southport and St Annes in 1886 inspired local committee member Charles Macara to campaign for more funds to support the families of volunteers who were killed during rescues. As a result, in the summer of 1891 over £10,000 was raised through newspaper campaigns in Yorkshire. He then went on to organise the first 'Lifeboat Day'. This was held in Manchester on 1 October 1891. Two lifeboats were paraded through the streets as volunteers collected money from the public. The boats were then launched on a lake in a park to give demonstrations. More than £5,000 was raised on the day.

=== Mechanisation and two world wars ===
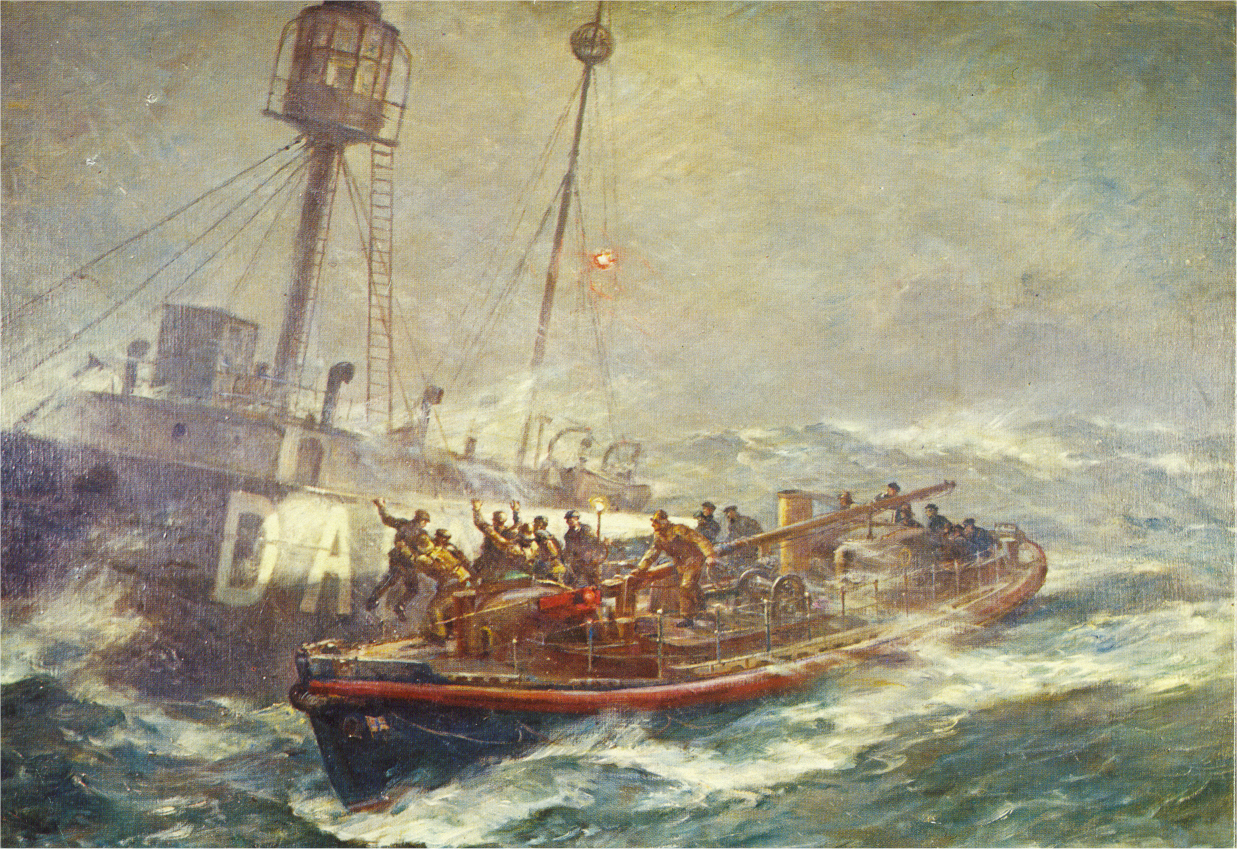
1974 commemorative postage stamp for the RNLI's 150th anniversary (Rescue of Daunt Lightship's crew by Ballycotton lifeboat RNLB Mary Stanford. Artist: B. F. Gribble)

Six steam-powered lifeboats were built between 1890 and 1901. A number of lifeboat stations used commercial steam tugs to tow lifeboats to where they were needed, but the only tug owned by the RNLI was the Helen Peele which operated at Padstow from 1901 to 1929. Petrol-engined lifeboats saw wider use. Initial examples were converted from 'pulling and sailing' lifeboats but purpose-built motor lifeboats started to appear from 1908. Production was severely restricted during the First World War.

During the First World War, lifeboat crews launched 1,808 times, rescuing 5,332 people. With many younger men on active service, the average age of a lifeboatman was over 50. Many launches were to ships that had been torpedoed or struck mines, including naval or merchant vessels on war duty; a notable example was the hospital ship SS Rohilla which foundered in 1914 and was attended by six lifeboats, saving 144 lives over a 50-hour rescue mission.

The creation of the Irish Free State in 1922 resulted in the RNLI operating in two countries, however the new Irish government was glad to see the lifeboat service continue as it was.

The first International Lifeboat Conference was held in London in 1924 on the 100th anniversary of the founding of the RNLI. Eight other countries sent delegations and it resulted in the establishment of the International Lifeboat Federation later that year. This is now known as the International Maritime Rescue Federation and has member organisations (including the RNLI) from more than 50 countries.

Construction of motor lifeboats, first petrol-engined but later with specialised diesel engines, resumed after the war. The switch to diesel power was because these used less fuel and could cover much larger distances. The Second World War again brought restrictions, but by now the fleet was largely motorised. In 1918 there had been 233 'pulling and sailing' lifeboats and 23 steam or petrol. In 1939, there were just 15 unpowered lifeboats, and the greater range of the motor lifeboats meant that only 145 were needed.

The RNLI's depot was moved from Poplar to Borehamwood in July 1939, a few months before the outbreak of the Second World War. The headquarters staff were also moved from London to Borehamwood during the war.

The war placed considerable extra demands on the RNLI, particularly in south and east England where the threat of invasion and enemy activity was ever-present, rescuing downed aircrew a frequent occurrence, and the constant danger of mines. During the war, 6,376 lives were saved.

Nineteen RNLI lifeboats sailed to Dunkirk between 27 May and 4 June 1940 to assist with the Dunkirk evacuation. Lifeboats from Ramsgate, (RNLB Prudential (ON 697)), and Margate, (RNLB Lord Southborough (ON 688)), went directly to France with their own crews, Ramsgate's crew collecting 2,800 troops. Both coxswains, Edward Parker from Margate and Howard Primrose Knight from Ramsgate were awarded the Distinguished Service Medal for their "gallantry and determination when ferrying troops from the beaches". Of the other lifeboats and crews summoned to Dover by the Admiralty, the first arrivals questioned the details of the service, in particular the impracticality of running heavy lifeboats on to the beach, loading them with soldiers, then floating them off. The dispute resulted in the first three crews being sent home. Subsequent lifeboats arriving were commandeered without discussion, much to the disappointment of many lifeboatmen. A later RNLI investigation resulted in the dismissal of two Hythe crew members, who were nevertheless vindicated in one aspect of their criticism, as Hythe's Viscountess Wakefield was run on to the beach at La Panne and unable to be refloated; she was the only lifeboat to be lost in the operation. Some RNLI crew members stayed in Dover for the emergency to provide repair and refuelling facilities, and after the end of the evacuation most lifeboats returned to their stations with varying levels of damage and continued their lifesaving services.

=== Developments after the war ===
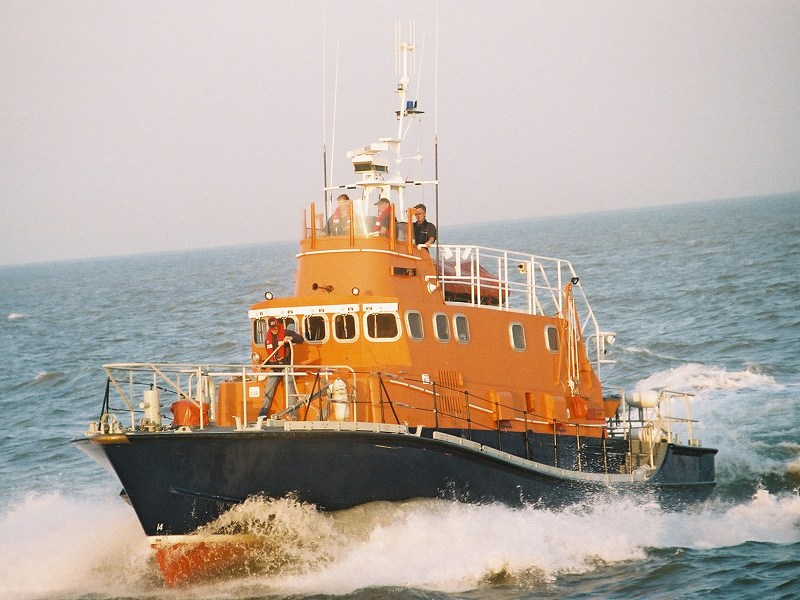
An Arun-class lifeboat

The diesel engines used in lifeboats continued to be developed after the war. A standard Gardner engine was found to work well in the marine environment and became the RNLI's standard from 1954. Using a commercial engine made maintenance and obtaining spare parts much easier than with the specialised engines used previously.

Faster lifeboats were developed from the 1960s by adopting new hull shapes. The first was the Waveney-class based on an American design, but the RNLI developed the concept with the Arun-class in the 1970s. Faster craft allowed the location of stations to be reviewed with the aim of being able to reach 95% of casualties within 30 minutes of launch. This meant that some stations could be closed as there were others nearby, but it also showed some gaps in coverage which required new stations to be opened.

For more than 100 years, most lifeboat launches had been to commercial vessels that were in distress. Improved engines and safety equipment, along with a reduction in coastal traffic, saw a reduction in these demands, however more leisure users were taking to the water. These people generally had less experience of the sea and were close to shore. The RNLI considered the use of small inflatable rescue boats. One was purchased for trials and the work of the lifesaving society in Brittany was studied. The first of these D-class lifeboats was deployed in 1963 and by 1969, there were 108 in service which had been launched 1,210 times and saved 541 lives. Larger inshore lifeboats were developed with the Atlantic 21 entering service in 1970.

The headquarters and depot were both moved to Poole in 1974. A new Lifeboat Support Centre and College were opened on the adjacent site 2004.

=== New services for the new century ===
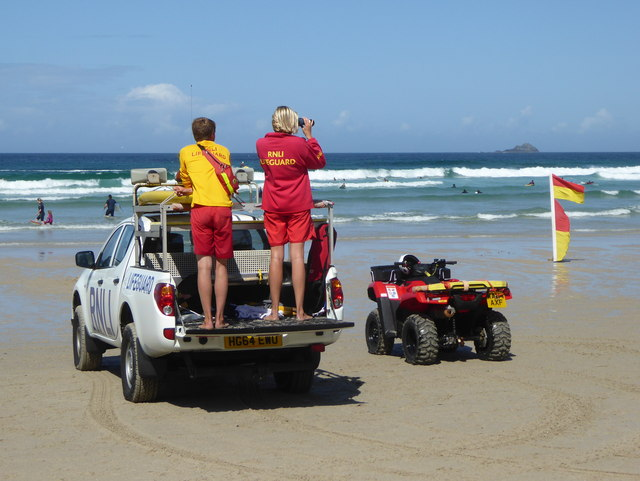
RNLI lifeguards on duty at Sennen in Cornwall

The RNLI made a study of its operations during the 1990s and concluded that little more could be done to save people after accidents at sea, but there was scope to reduce the number of accidents happening. This entailed establishing some new services that do not directly involve traditional lifeboats stationed around the coast. A 'Sea Safety' campaign produces various short guides with advice and safety information for different types of user such as divers, sailors and users of personal water craft. 'Sea Check' volunteers also provide inspections and advice for leisure boat owners.

Attention was also paid to people on beaches. The RNLI started to provide lifeguards on certain beaches in May 2001. By the end of the decade, the service was provided at 100 beaches and more than 10,000 people were being given aid each year. 2001 also saw the first lifeboat stations established on inland waters. Enniskillen Lifeboat Station on Lough Erne was opened in May 2001 and several stations were established on the River Thames in 2002.

==== Migrant crisis ====
From 2021, the RNLI was criticised for its actions during the English Channel migrant crisis as lifeboats were called upon by HM Coastguard (as are all lifeboat launches) to rescue migrants attempting to cross the English Channel in small boats. The British government praised the RNLI's 'vital work' but in 2021 politician Nigel Farage referred to the organisation as being used as a "taxi service for illegal trafficking gangs". The public response was a 3,000% rise in daily donations and a 270% increase in people viewing the RNLI website's volunteering opportunities page after the chief executive disclosed the verbal abuse received by volunteers from members of the public. In 2024, the RNLI launched 114 times to small boats, considering this as part of their compassionate service, but which represented just over 1% of their call-outs nationally and saved the lives of 58 migrants, children among them. In September 2026, with migrants launching from further west in France, they were assisted by the RNLI south of the Isle of Wight, but the RNLI was refused landing permission in Portsmouth or Southampton, and landed the migrants at Eastney instead. They were met by a large body of protestors and police.

== Rescues, losses and medals ==
=== Rescues and lives saved ===
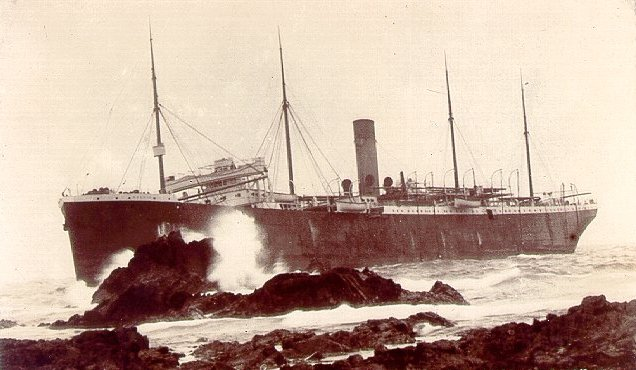
Suevic on the rocks, 1907

The RNLI's definition of a life saved is one where the person would have died if not for an intervention by the RNLI or other third party/emergency service.

The RNLI was formed in 1824 and in that year 124 lives were saved. By 1829 more than 1,000 people had been saved and by the end of the century the total had risen to 41,820. Between 1900 and 1999 there were 91,952 saved, the greatest number in a single year being 1,837 in 1973. Fewer people have needed to be saved in recent years; in 2024 352 lives were saved and another 8,259 people aided. However, 2024 was the RNLI's busiest year in the UK, with over 9,100 launches.

The biggest rescue in the RNLI's history was on 17 March 1907, when the 12,000 tonne liner SS Suevic hit the Maenheere Reef near Lizard Point in Cornwall. In a strong gale and dense fog, RNLI lifeboat volunteers rescued 456 passengers, including 70 babies. Crews from The Lizard, Cadgwith, Coverack and Porthleven rowed out repeatedly for 16 hours to rescue all of the people on board. Six silver RNLI medals were later awarded, two to Suevic crew members.

While the RNLI exists to 'save lives at sea', it does not salvage ships and cargoes. It will tow a boat to safety when that is appropriate but does not charge a salvage fee, however it does encourage voluntary contributions to their funds. This stance was demonstrated at Newquay in 2009, when the RNLI was criticised for not launching a lifeboat in order to aid an uncrewed fishing vessel that had run aground. A spokesperson for the RNLI declared that "We are not a salvage firm and our charity's aim is to provide immediate assistance for people in trouble at sea and lives are at risk." There have been a few isolated cases where individual lifeboat crew members have claimed salvage. There is no legal reason why crew members of the RNLI could not salvage a vessel, since they frequently tow small vessels to safety, often over long distances.

=== Lifeboat and crew losses ===
One of William Hillary's concerns in setting up the NIPLS in 1824 was that people were putting their lives in danger to rescue people from shipwrecks. Since then, more than 600 people have died in the service of the RNLI.

A memorial was unveiled outside the RNLI's Poole headquarters in 2009. It was designed by Sam Holland and bears William Hillary's motto: with courage, nothing is impossible. The names of all those who have lost their lives are inscribed around it. There is also an RNLI memorial at the National Memorial Arboretum at Alrewas.

=== Medals ===
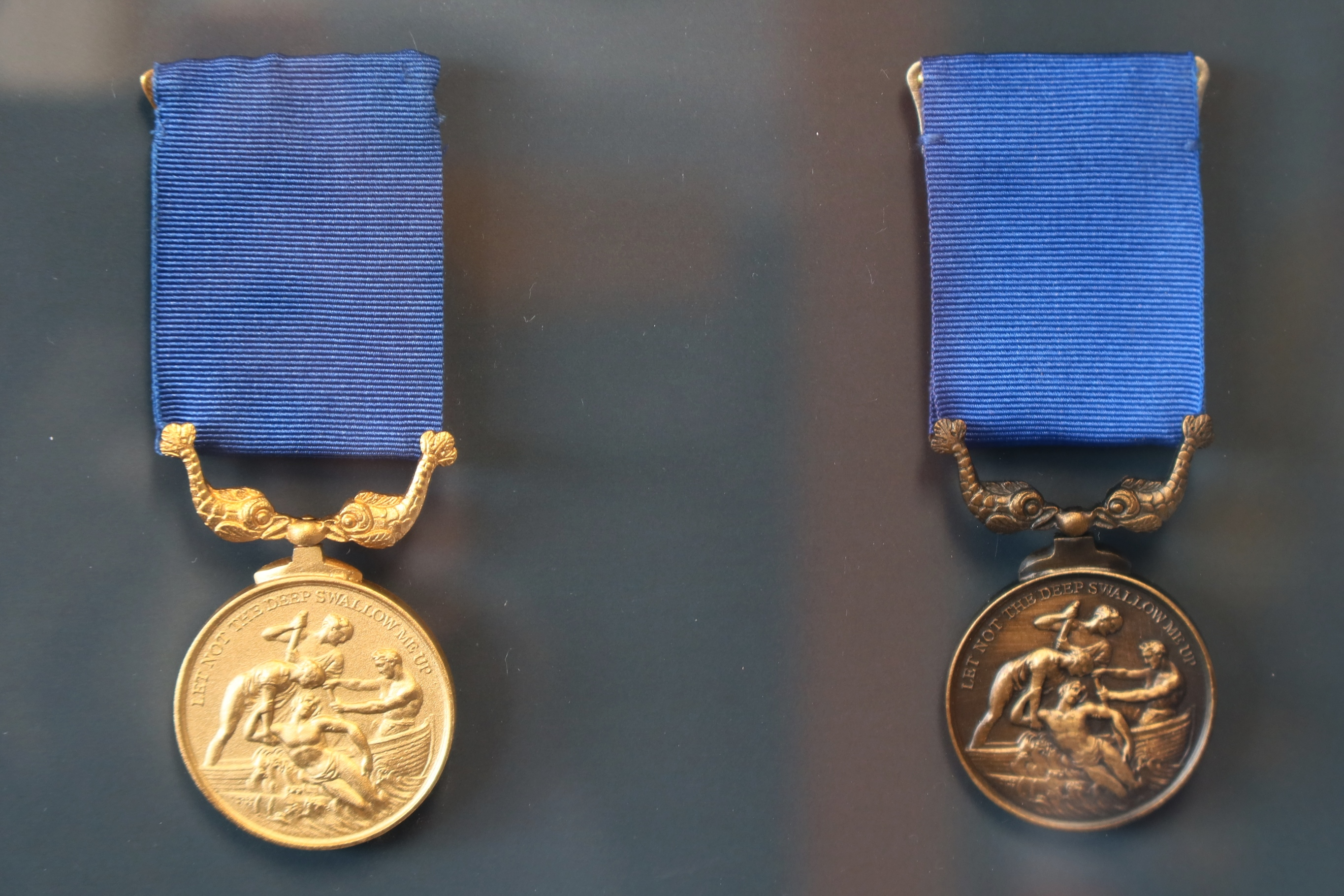
RNLI gold and bronze medals

The RNLI awards gold, silver and bronze medals to its crews for bravery. The 'Thanks of the Institution Inscribed on Vellum' may also be awarded for significant contributions. In the 180 years to 2004 some 150 gold, 1,563 silver and 791 bronze medals had been presented. Significant activities may also be recognised by a 'Framed letter of thanks' from the Chairman or a 'Letter of appreciation' from the Chief Executive or Operations Director.

The Ralph Glister Award was inaugurated in 1968 for the most meritorious inshore rescue boat service each year. The Walter Groombridge Award was established in 1986 in memory of Brighton Lifeboat Station's Administration Officer has been renamed the Walter and Elizabeth Groombridge Award in memory of his wife who died in 1989.

The most decorated lifeboatman was Henry Blogg, coxswain of Cromer for 37 years, with three gold medals and four silver. He was also awarded the Empire Gallantry Medal in 1924, converted to a George Cross in 1941, and the British Empire Medal, and is known as "The Greatest of all Lifeboatmen". Some other lifeboat crew who have received multiple medals include: (Note: When a second or third medal of the same colour is awarded, the recipient just receives a clasp to add to their first medal.)

- William Henry Tregidgo received silver medals in 1853, 1858 and 1860 for rescues at Bude, Boscastle and Newquay.
- Robert Hook, coxswain at Lowestoft from 1853 to 1883, was awarded a silver medal in 1859, and again in 1873.
- Daniel Shea, coxswain at Padstow, was awarded a silver medal for two services in 1859, another in 1860 and a third in 1866.
- Henry Freeman, the Whitby coxswain for 22 years, was awarded silver medals in 1861 and 1880.
- Sydney James Harris, Coxswain Superintendent of Great Yarmouth and Gorleston, was awarded the silver medal five times, for services in 1904, 1905, 1909, 1912 and 1916.
- Charles Ambrose Johnson, Coxswain of Great Yarmouth and Gorleston was awarded the silver medal in 1941, along with four bronze medals won in 1922, 1938, 1940 and 1941.
- Patrick Power, coxswain at Dunmore East, was awarded the bronze medal four times, in 1941, 1951, 1961 and 1964.
- Richard Evans of Moelfre was awarded a bronze medal in 1943 and two gold medals in 1959 and 1966, both for rescues in hurricanes.
- Daniel Kirkpatrick, coxswain of the Longhope lifeboat, was given silver medals for rescues in 1959, 1964 and 1968. This meant that he was the only person at that time with three silver medals. He would be one of 8 crew lost in the Longhope lifeboat disaster, when the lifeboat capsized in a storm on 17 March 1969.
- Coxswain Brian Bevan of the Humber lifeboat is the only crew member to be awarded with bronze, silver and gold medals for gallantry, and have them presented at the same awards ceremony. This was for three medal services carried out over just a 7-week period between December 1978 and February 1979.
- Coxswain Hewitt Clark of the Lerwick lifeboat was awarded the bronze medal on three occasions, 1983, 1989 and 1993, followed by a silver medal in 1995, all aboard the Arun-class lifeboat 52-10 Soldian (ON 1057). This would be followed by a gold medal for the service to the Green Lily in 1997.

One lifeboat has received an award: for the Daunt lightship rescue in 1936 the RNLB Mary Stanford and her entire crew were decorated.

In 2022, Trearddur Bay Helmsman Lee Duncan became the first crew member of an Atlantic 85 lifeboat to be awarded the RNLI silver medal for the rescue of a surfer in extreme weather conditions. His three other crew members, Dafydd Griffiths, Leigh McCann and Michael Doran, were each awarded the RNLI bronze medal.

== Organisation ==
The RNLI was granted a Royal Charter of incorporation 1860 which has been revised several times since then. It is governed by a Trustee Board which receives advice and assistance from a Council and specialist committees. Day-to-day operations are managed by an Executive Team of senior managers led by a chief executive.

The RNLI is split into six administrative regions:

Region	Lifeboat stations	Lifeguard beaches (Note: The RNLI's Annual Report for 2025 states there are 242 lifeguard units but only 238 were operated in 2024.)
North and East England	36	44
South East England	31	42
South West England	33	87
Wales, West and Isle of Man	46	49
Ireland	46	12
Scotland	46	8

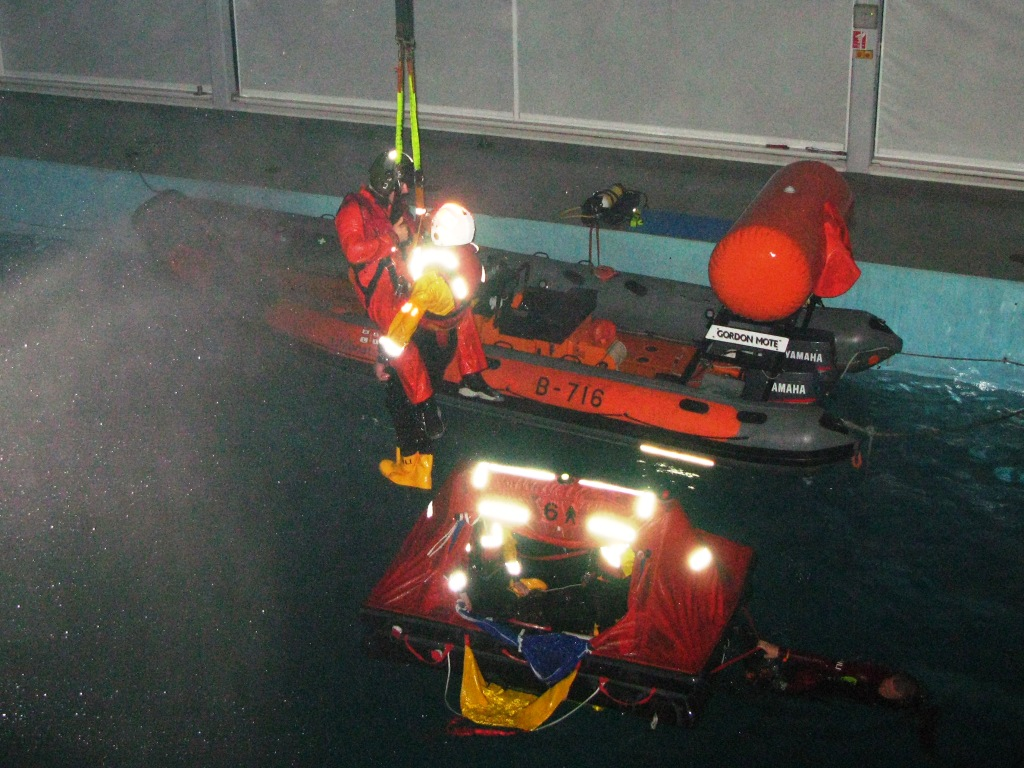
Practising helicopter winching in the college's survival pool

The RNLI's headquarters are in Poole, Dorset, adjacent to Holes Bay in Poole Harbour. The site includes the Lifeboat Support Centre and is opposite the RNLI College where crews and lifeguards are trained. The college also offers full-board hotel accommodation to the general public when not in use by RNLI crews and staff. The support centre and college were opened by Queen Elizabeth II in 2004. The college includes a survival pool and lifeboat simulators. Crews are trained here to operate their lifeboat in many situations including capsizes and working with helicopters. RNLI Ireland has a headquarters at Airside in Swords, County Dublin.

The institution has enjoyed royal patronage since its foundation. The patrons have been King George IV (1824–1830), King William IV (1830–1837), Queen Victoria (1837–1901), King Edward VII (1901–1910), King George V (1910–1936), Queen Mary (1911–1953), Queen Alexandra (1913–1925), King Edward VIII (1936), King George VI (1937–1952), Queen Elizabeth The Queen Mother (1937–2002), and Queen Elizabeth II (1952–2022) and, since 14 May 2024, King Charles III.

== Operations ==
The RNLI provides lifeboat services around the coasts and on certain inland waterways throughout the United Kingdom, Ireland and offshore islands. In 2023 this involved operations from 238 lifeboat stations with a fleet of 432 rescue craft (in 2023) that launched 9,192 times. There are also 245 beaches patrolled by lifeguard units who aided more than 17,000 people in 2024, which number doubled to more than 36,000 in 2025. These services are provided by nearly 9,000 lifeboat volunteers and about 2,850 paid staff including lifeguards.

=== Lifeboat stations ===
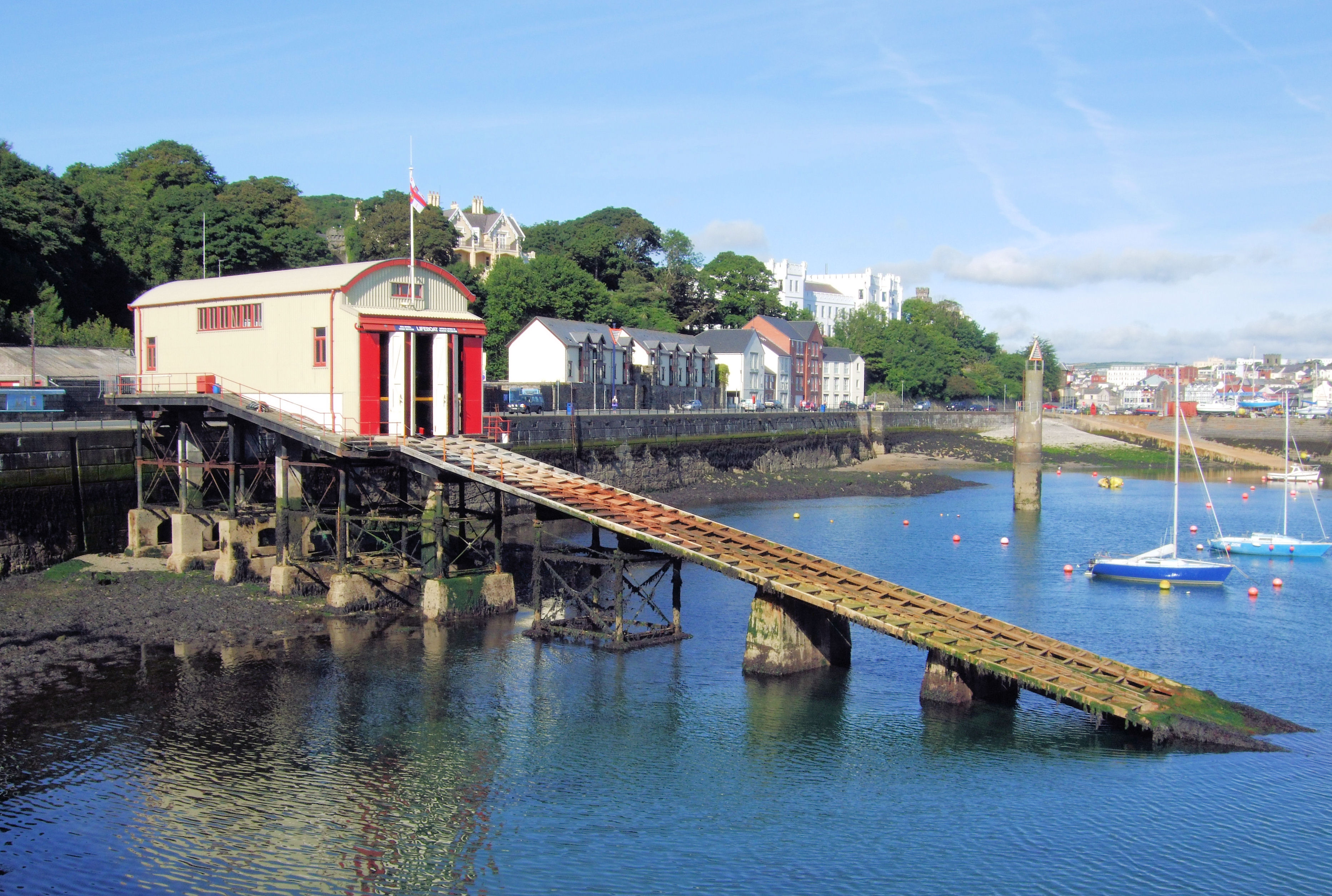
Lifeboat station and slipway at Douglas, Isle of Man

The RNLI operated 238 RNLI lifeboat stations in 2023 around the coasts of Great Britain, Ireland, the Isle of Man and the Channel Islands. Stations will be equipped with all-weather lifeboats and/or inshore lifeboats to suit their local needs. Launch methods vary too, generally having larger boats moored afloat or launched on a slipway while smaller boats are often put in the water on trolleys propelled by tractors.

Tower Lifeboat Station on the River Thames in London is the RNLI's busiest; in 2013 crews rescued 372 people and saved 25 lives.

Many other stations have been operated by the RNLI but have since closed as demands changed. Some of these locations now have an independent lifeboat service.

=== Lifeboats and other rescue craft ===
The RNLI operated 432 lifeboats and other rescue craft in 2023, although the number changes from time-to-time as older boats are retired and new ones provided, and the needs of the lifeboat stations change. The names of lifeboats are prefixed 'RNLB' (for Royal National Lifeboat). All display an Operation Number so that they can be easily identified; all-weather lifeboats are also allocated a sequential Official Number (ON) which is used in RNLI records.

There are two broad types of lifeboat:

- All-weather lifeboats (ALBs) are large boats with enclosed wheelhouses and survivor spaces below deck, which are self-righting and can go out in all weather conditions. Some ALBs carry an inflatable Y-class lifeboat or Y-boat for inshore work, launched by mechanical arm. There are five classes of ALBs with speeds ranging from 17 to 25 knots (31 to 46 km/h; 20 to 29 mph). They are classed as Mersey, Trent, Severn, Tamar and Shannon-class.
- Inshore lifeboats (ILBs) are inflatable and rigid-hulled inflatable boats (RIBs) that operate closer to the shore and in shallower waters than ALBs. The smaller ones are known as D-class and the larger as B-class. Special E-class boats work on the River Thames. All are built and maintained at the RNLI's Inshore Lifeboat Centre at Cowes, Isle of Wight.

Other craft include H-class hovercraft, small inflatable rescue boats, personal water craft and boarding boats

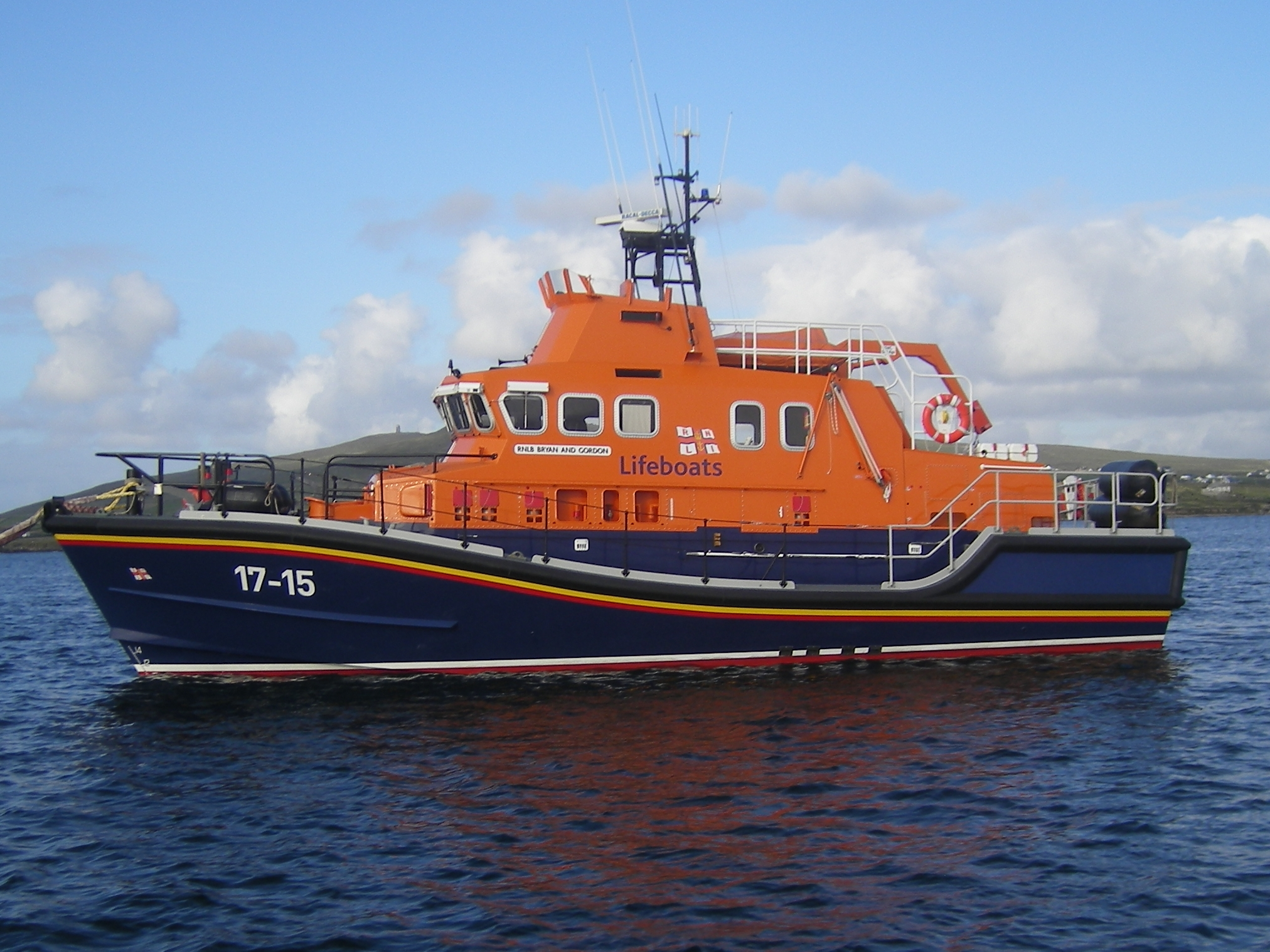
Severn-class ALB

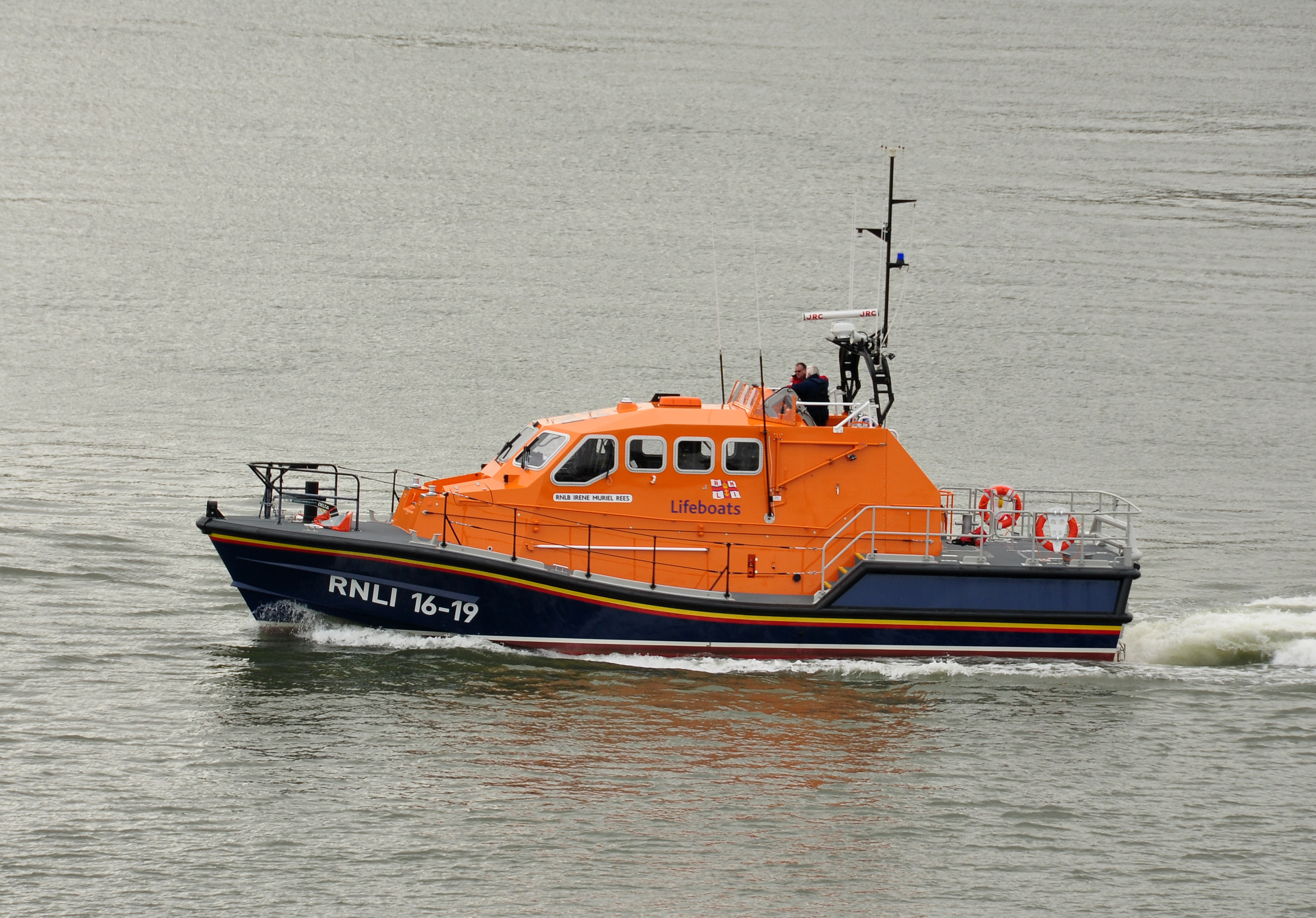
Tamar-class ALB

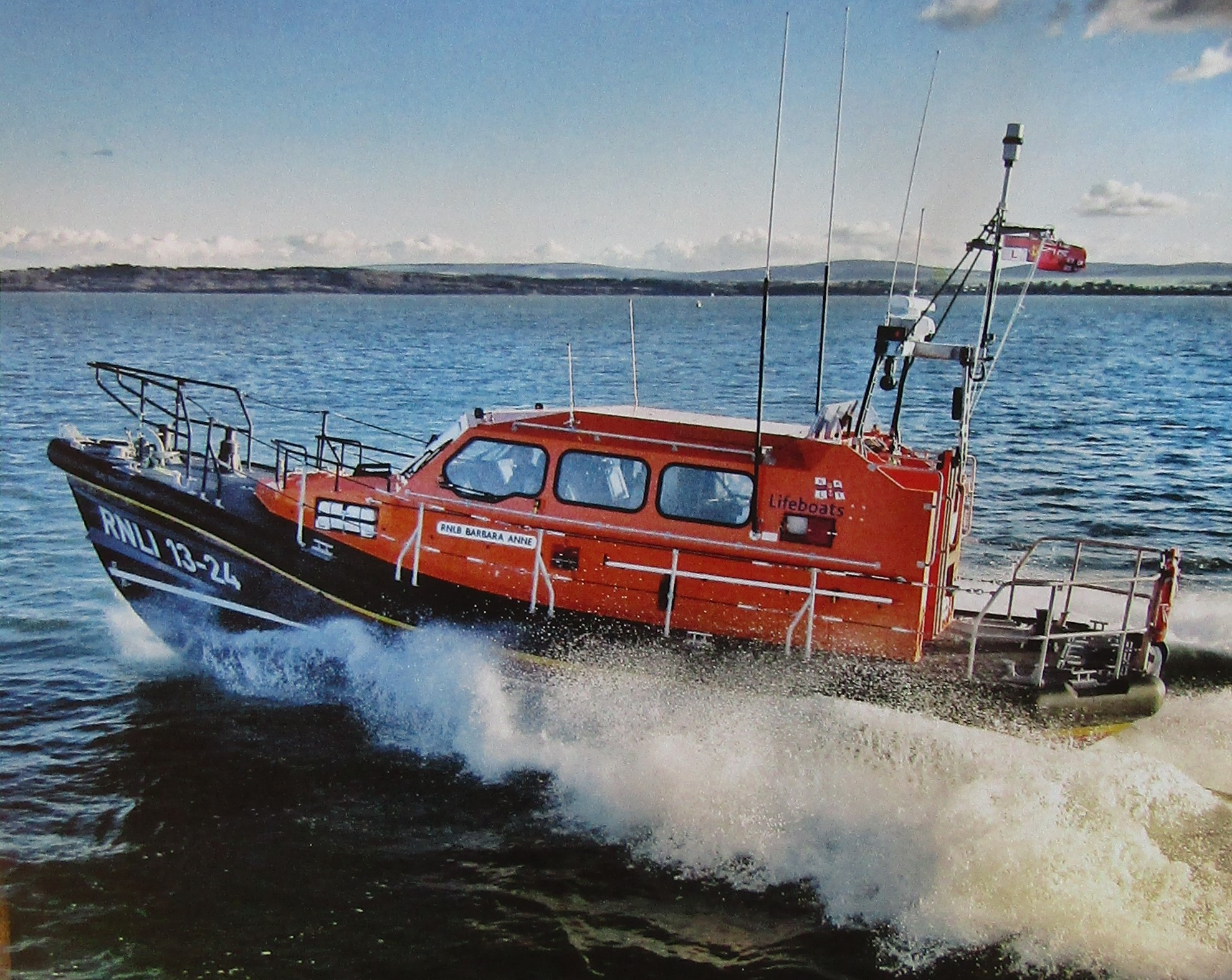
Shannon-class ALB

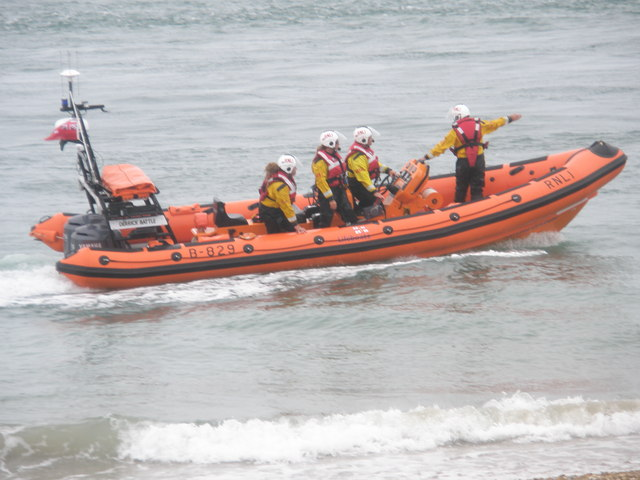
B-class ILB

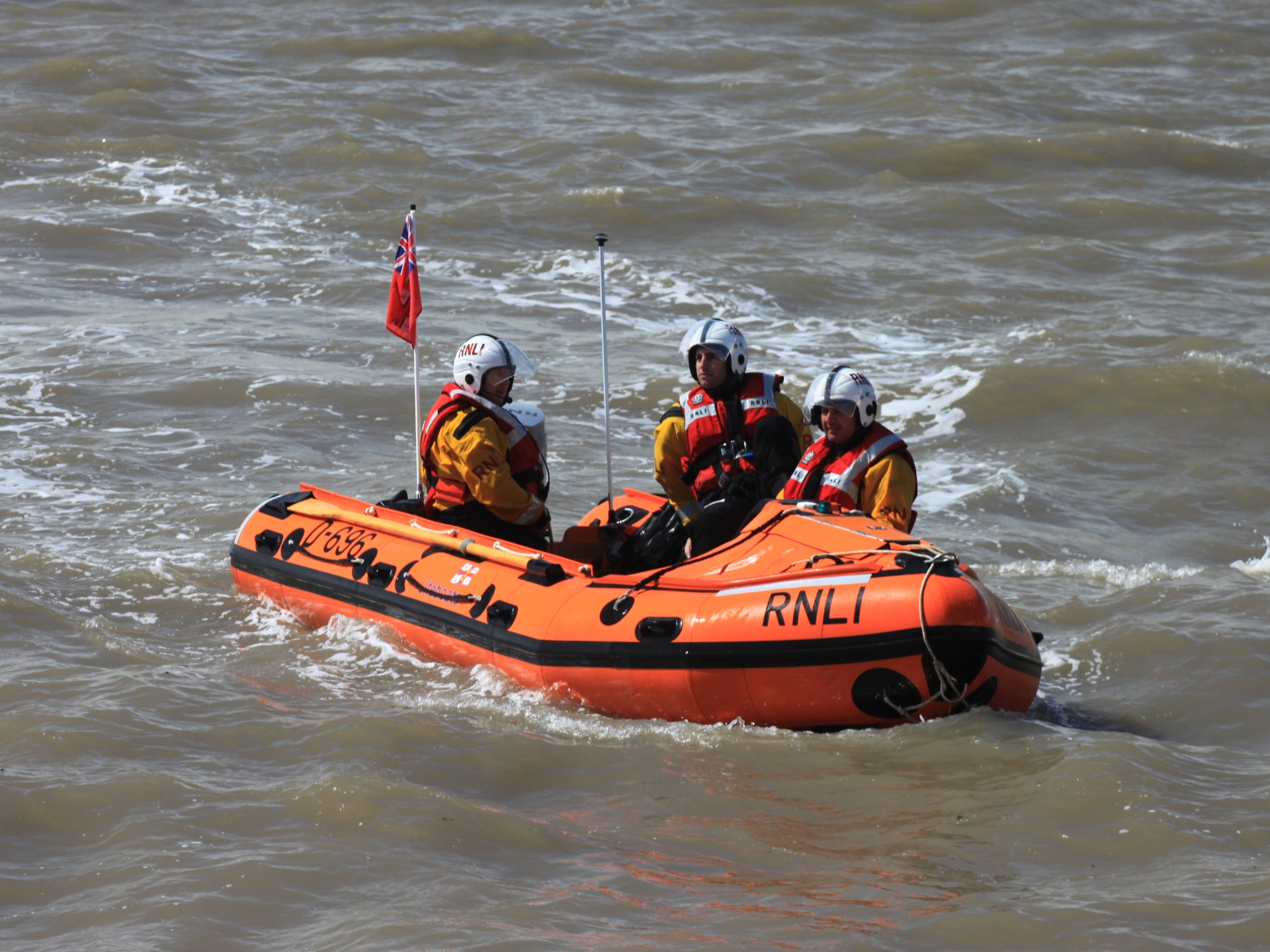
D-class ILB

=== Personnel and equipment ===
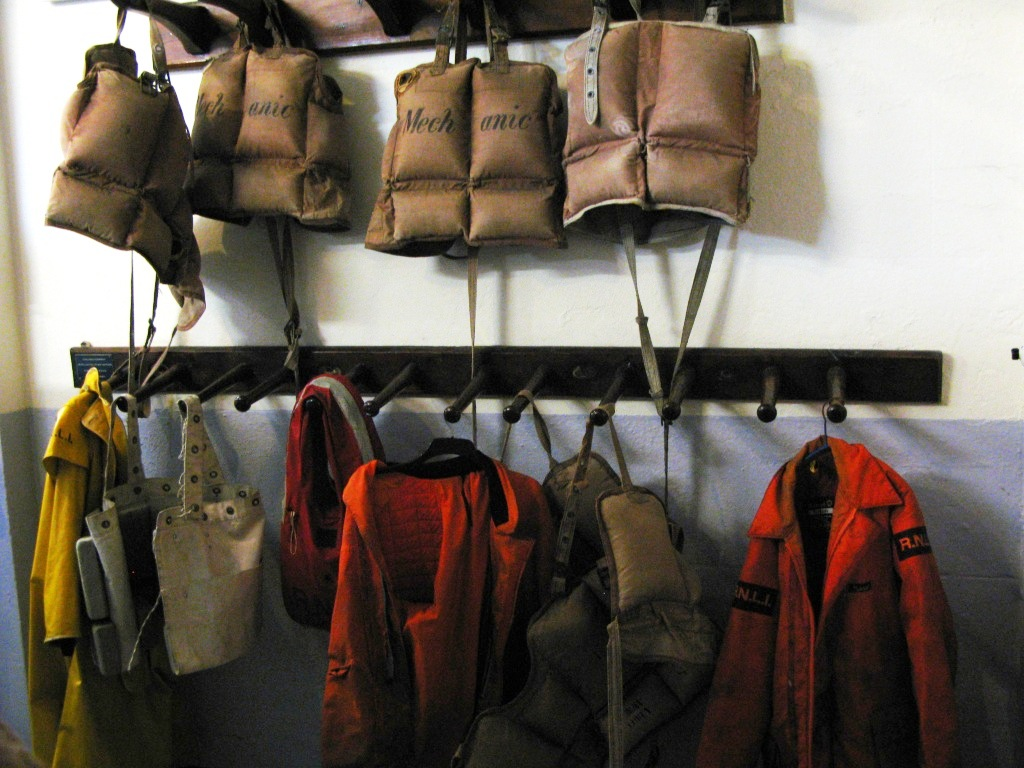
Lifejackets from different years at the Poole Lifeboat Museum

97% of lifeboat crews are volunteers.

In the early days of the service, lifeboat launch and recovery was usually undertaken by women. There were deeply-held views about women crewing the boats – it was considered extremely bad luck. Along all parts of the coastline, women supported their men on the lifeboat crews by working together to get the lifeboat afloat and then later recovering it from the water in readiness for when the next call came. Lifeboat crew are still predominantly male (92 per cent in 2013, falling to 90 per cent in 2022) but increasing numbers of women are now found in the lifeboat and shore crews.

The first female (inshore) crew member was Elizabeth Hostvedt at Atlantic College in 1969, and Frances Glody was the first woman member of an all-weather lifeboat crew at Dunmore East in 1981. Aileen Jones at Porthcawl was the first female lifeboat crew member to receive a medal for bravery. Lauren McGuire at Clovelly became the youngest station manager in 2011. In 2017, Di Bush at Harwich Lifeboat Station became the RNLI's first female full-time mechanic and four years later she was appointed as the first female full-time coxswain. Cardigan launched an all-female crew in 2011, believed to be a first in Wales. In 2022, Cullercoats RNLI station launched its first all-female lifeboat crew. Figures published in 2022 show lifeguards comprise 29 per cent women, and the RNLI total workforce to be 34 per cent women.

Lifeboat crews are trained at their stations and at the Lifeboat College in Poole. They are provided with safety clothing. The first cork lifejackets were introduced in the 1850s but lighter, less bulky, kapok lifejackets were introduced in 1904. Inflatable 'Beaufort' lifejackets were introduced in 1972 but 'Crewsaver' lifejackets are now used with different designs for inshore or all-weather lifeboat crews.

=== Water safety ===
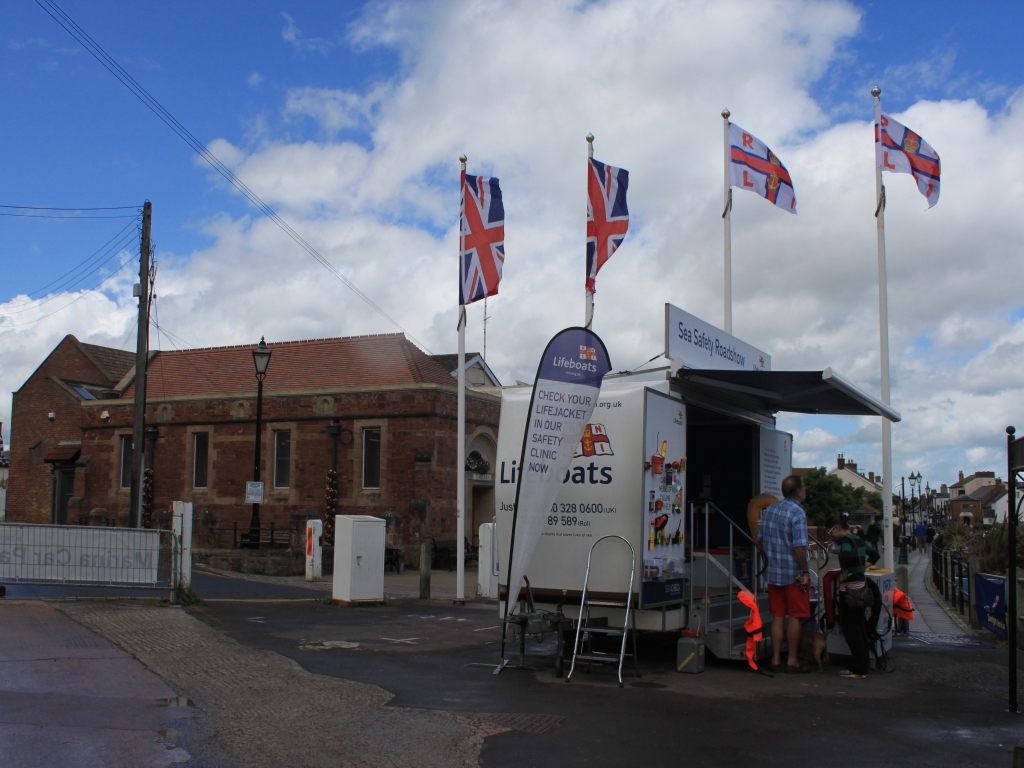
A Sea Safety event outside the former lifeboat station at Watchet

Volunteers (1,000 in 2023) provide water safety advice and training to various water users, ranging from schools to commercial boat users.

The RNLI offers safety advice in person and in publications to boat and beach users when the opportunity arises, and to at-risk groups such as anglers, divers and kayakers. The RNLI runs sea and beach safety sessions for young people, particularly those in at-risk communities. It extends practical or strategic safety advice to lifesaver organisations overseas.

=== International work ===
The RNLI was asked to help transport aid following floods in East Pakistan during 1970. 20 D-class craft and 57 crew were air lifted to the country. Similar operations happened in Bangladesh again in 1988, in Mozambique in 2000 and Guyana in 2005.

RNLI lifeboats that have been replaced by more modern boats are often sold to other countries including Iceland, Uruguay, Chile and China. Training and education support is also provided to many countries including Bangladesh and Tanzania.

== Finances ==
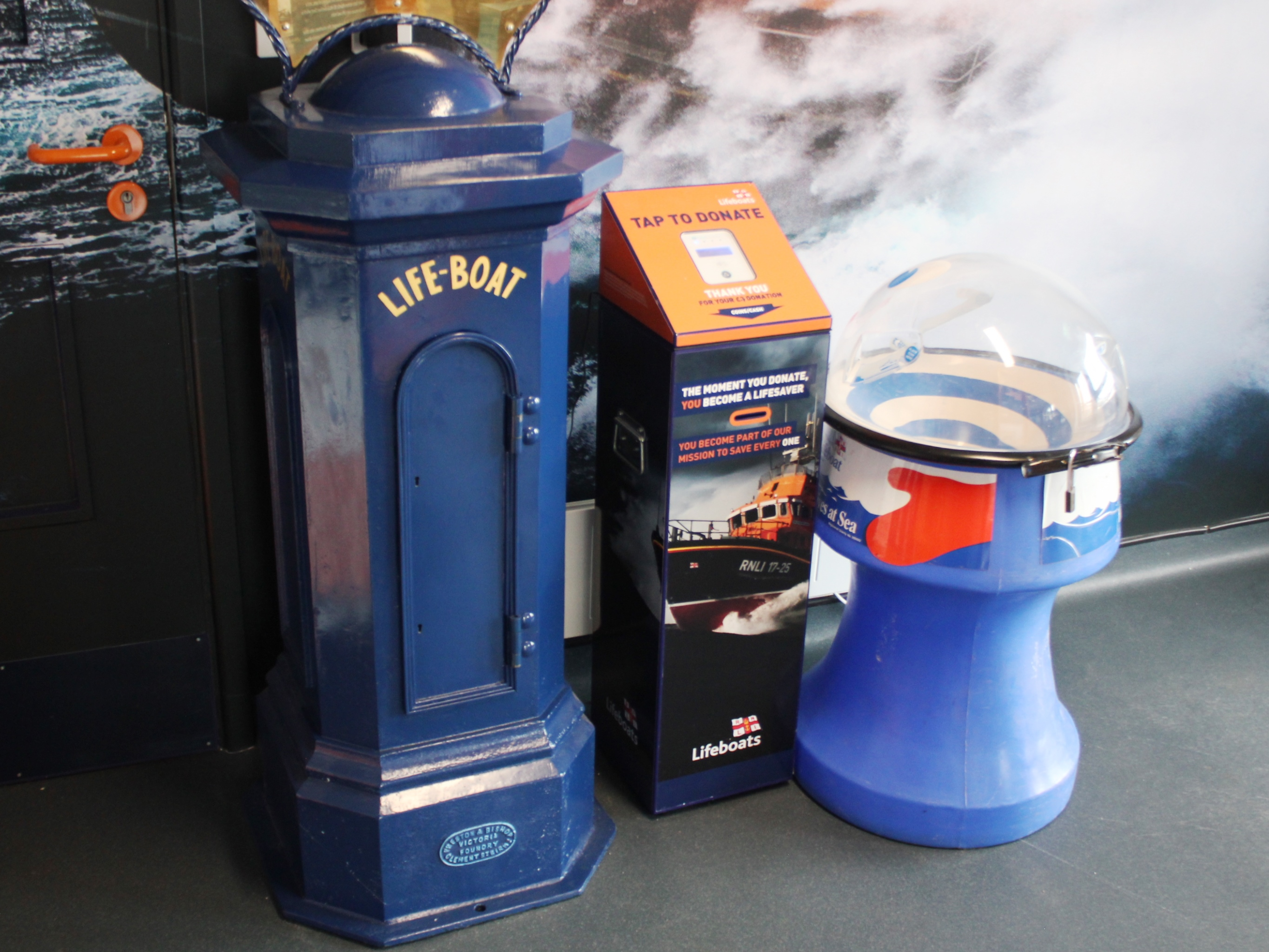
Examples of collection boxes from different eras

The RNLI is a registered charity that 'saves lives at sea'. Its income in 2024 was £207.8 million:

RNLI income 2024
Income source	£	%
Legacies	£120.7 million	58%
Voluntary donations	£60.9 million	29%
Trading activities	£18.2 million	9%
Investments	£2.2 million	1%
Other sources including government grants	£5.8 million	3%

Its charitable expenditure in 2024 was £119.8 million – 58% of its income. It also spent £53.4 million (19% of its income) on fundraising.

RNLI charitable expenditure 2024
Purpose	£	%
Lifeboat rescue	£89.0 million	74%
Lifeguard rescue	£21.5 million	18%
Water safety and education	£6.7 million	6%
International work	£2.6 million	2%
Total	£119.8 million.	

Much of the funding comes from legacies, trusts and institutional donors. One of the biggest is the Communications and Public Service Lifeboat Fund (known simply as 'The Lifeboat Fund'). This was established in 1886 for civil servants to collectively support the RNLI and has provided 53 lifeboats.

Volunteers operate shops in many towns and take part in street collections and open days. Many forms of collection boxes have been placed in lifeboat stations but are sometimes targeted by thieves. A typical cast iron collection box in Porthgwarra, Cornwall, is Grade II listed as is an unusual fish-shaped one in Robin Hood's Bay.

== Heritage and museums ==
The RNLI Heritage Collection Trust 2012 is responsible for the organisation's historic objects and archives. It runs a number of museums:

- RNLI Historic Lifeboat Collection, Chatham Historic Dockyard
- Grace Darling Museum, Bamburgh
- Henry Blogg Museum, Cromer
- Eastbourne Lifeboat Museum, Eastbourne
- Moelfre Sea Watch Centre, Moelfre, Anglesey
- Poole Old Lifeboat Museum, Poole
- Salcombe Lifeboat Museum, Salcombe
- Whitby Lifeboat Museum, Whitby

Other independent lifeboat museums can be found, many of which will have RNLI memorabilia:

- East Durham Heritage and Lifeboat Centre, Seaham
- Harwich Lifeboat Museum, Harwich
- Longhope Lifeboat Museum, Longhope, Orkney
- Sheringham Museum at The Mo.
- Zetland Lifeboat Museum and Redcar Heritage Centre, Redcar (the world's oldest intact lifeboat)

The RNLI 200th anniversary and Isle of Man's maritime heritage exhibition 'All at Sea' is at House of Manannan, Peel, Isle of Man, from 17 February 2024 to 26 January 2025. It is supported by the RNLI Heritage Collection Trust 2012.

The 'Women of the RNLI' exhibition to celebrate the RNLI 200th anniversary is at The National Maritime Museum, Greenwich, from 2 March 2024 to 1 December 2024. It features the work of photographer Jack Lowe, who uses the Victorian Collodion wet plate process to create the images.

Many old lifeboats have been preserved by enthusiasts. They often appear at events including historic lifeboat gatherings at Fowey which have been held most years since 2002. The Lifeboat Enthusiasts' Society was established in 1964 and supports the work of the RNLI Heritage Collection Trust and all aspects of lifeboat study including collecting ephemera and modelling.

== Media and image ==
Newspapers often include reports about lifeboats, their rescues and losses. Since the 1890s they have also played their part in fund raising.

The first appearance of an RNLI lifeboat on television was in 1947 when the New Quay pulling and sailing lifeboat was filmed as it was about to be replaced by a motor lifeboat. Since then many programmes have been made about lifeboats and their crews. Some were featured on This is Your Life and viewers of Blue Peter have raised funds to buy many lifeboats.

The Mumbles Lifeboat Station took centre stage in the BBC drama series Ennal's Point in 1982 which starred Philip Madoc as a lifeboat coxswain. The series was based on a book by Alun Richards who wanted to show lifeboat crews as "ordinary men who became extraordinary because of their very nature of their task, saving life in any weather".

Documentary series have been made about the lifeboat stations at Humber in 1984 and Salcombe in 1993. The long-running BBC series, Saving Lives at Sea first aired in 2016.

On 2 August 2024, a song commemorating the 200th anniversary of the service titled "Brave Volunteers" was released by Seth Lakeman and Fisherman's Friends.

=== Lifeboat journal ===
The RNLI published the first issue of The Life-Boat in March 1852. It was sold for 1½d for "laying before the public all the information respecting the construction and establishment of Life-Boats, the number of Shipwrecks, the exertions made to save Life and Property, and the prizes and medals awarded to those who have been most active in that noble service".

It was sub-titled Journal of the National Shipwreck Institution but from Volume 2 in 1855 this was changed to reflect the organisations new name which was adopted the previous year to be the Journal of the National Life-Boat Institution. The last issue under this name was volume 31, no. 341 in April 1940; Life-boat War Bulletins were published from No. 1 in September 1940; from 1945 to December 1946 simply entitled Life-boat Bulletin. From volume 32, no. 342 (June 1947), the journal has been called The Life-boat, more recently The Lifeboat and then Lifeboat.

=== RNLI flag ===
Flag of the RNLI with Tudor crown

The first design of the RNLI flag was created by Leonora Preston in 1884 after her brother was rescued by Ramsgate lifeboat volunteers. The design depicts Saint George's Cross bordered by a dark blue line and within the white cantons, initials of the charity name coloured red. The first design included the Tudor crown worn by George VI at the centre of the cross with a foul anchor below it, representing the charity's dedication to the royal charter and to the sea. The design was formally adopted in 1908 and was flown at every lifeboat station thereafter.

The design of the flag has changed twice to reflect changing royal patronage. In 1953, following Elizabeth II's coronation, the design was altered to exchange the Tudor crown with St Edward's crown to represent the newly appointed monarch. Following the accession of Charles III, the design re-adopted the Tudor crown.

In 1964 the RNLI had a red ensign approved, which is flown from lifeboats.

== See also ==
- Isle of Man Coastguard
- Independent lifeboats in Britain and Ireland
- Similar organisations of other nations
  - Royal Netherlands Sea Rescue Institution
  - Société Nationale de Sauvetage en Mer – France
  - German Sea Rescue Society
  - Norwegian Society for Sea Rescue
  - Swedish Sea Rescue Society
  - Royal Canadian Marine Search and Rescue – West Coast of Canada
  - National Sea Rescue Institute – South Africa
