= St Gallgo's Church, Llanallgo =

Coordinates: 53.341150°N 4.252410°W

St Gallgo's Church
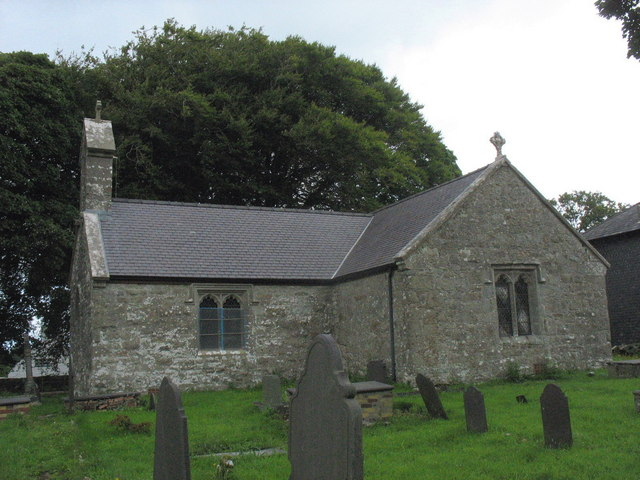
- The south side of the church

- Location in Anglesey
- Location: Llanallgo, Anglesey
- Country: Wales
- Denomination: Church in Wales
- Website: Church website

History
- Status: Church
- Founded: Early 6th century or 605 (sources disagree)
- Dedication: St Gallgo

Architecture
- Functional status: Active
- Heritage designation: Grade II
- Designated: 12 May 1970
- Style: Perpendicular architecture

Specifications
- Length: 24 ft (7.3 m) (nave)
- Width: 12 ft (3.7 m) (nave and chancel)
- Materials: Rubble masonry

Administration
- Province: Province of Wales
- Diocese: Diocese of Bangor
- Archdeaconry: Bangor
- Deanery: Twrcelyn
- Parish: Llaneugrad and Llanallgo with Penrhosllugwy with Llanfihangel Tre'r Beirdd

Clergy
- Rector: Vacant

St Gallgo's Church, Llanallgo (Welsh: [ɬanˈaɬgɔ]) is a small church near the village of Llanallgo, on the east coast of Anglesey, north Wales. The chancel and transepts, which are the oldest features of the present building, date from the late 15th century, but there has been a church on the site since the 6th or early 7th century, making it one of the oldest Christian sites in Anglesey. Some restoration and enlargement took place during the 19th century.

The church is associated with the 1859 wreck of the Royal Charter off Anglesey; it was used as a temporary mortuary, and 140 of the victims are buried in the churchyard. Charles Dickens, who wrote about the loss of the ship, noted the care taken by the rector, Stephen Roose Hughes, for the victims and their families. Hughes died a few years later following the strain of the events and is also buried in the churchyard.

The church is still used for worship by the Church in Wales, as one of four churches in a combined parish. There is a regular pattern of services in English and in Welsh. St Gallgo's is a Grade II listed building, a national designation given to "buildings of special interest, which warrant every effort being made to preserve them", as a "rural church with strong Perpendicular character", retaining some features from the late 15th century. The church contains a late 13th-century bell, with an impression of a coin of King Edward I, some memorials from the 17th to 19th centuries, and some church furniture from the early 20th century in an Arts and Craft style.

== History and location ==
St Gallgo's Church stands to the southwest of the village of Llanallgo, near the eastern coast of Anglesey, north Wales. It is about 6 miles (9.7 km) from Llangefni, the county town. According to the 19th-century writer Samuel Lewis, St Gallgo established the first church here in the early 7th century; Angharad Llwyd, a 19th-century historian of Anglesey, gives the foundation year as 605. Another writer, Geraint Jones, puts it earlier, and says in his 2006 guide to the churches of Anglesey that Gallgo established the church in the early 6th century; Jones says that it is "one of the oldest Christian sites in Anglesey." Gallgo was one of the sons of St Caw, a king from northern Britain, and a brother of St Gildas and St Eugrad (the latter establishing the nearby church of St Eugrad's in about 605 as well. Llwyd also recorded that there was a well near the church named after Gallgo, and said that "miraculous cures" had been ascribed to the waters, which were "strongly impregnated with sulphate of lime".

The village takes its name from the church; the Welsh word llan originally meant "enclosure" and then "church", and "-allgo" is a modified form of the saint's name. The presence of a church here was recorded in the Norwich Taxation of 1254, but the oldest parts of the structure of the present building (the chancel and transepts) date from the late 15th century. It was formerly used as a chapel of ease for St Eugrad's Church. Repair work was carried out in 1831, which included adding a west window, and extensive restoration in 1892 (under Henry Kennedy, the architect of the Diocese of Bangor) included rebuilding the west walls of the transepts and lengthening the nave. In 1934, the sanctuary was restored in memory of a former rector, Stephen Roose Hughes. The vestry was badly damaged by fire in 2004, but has since been repaired.

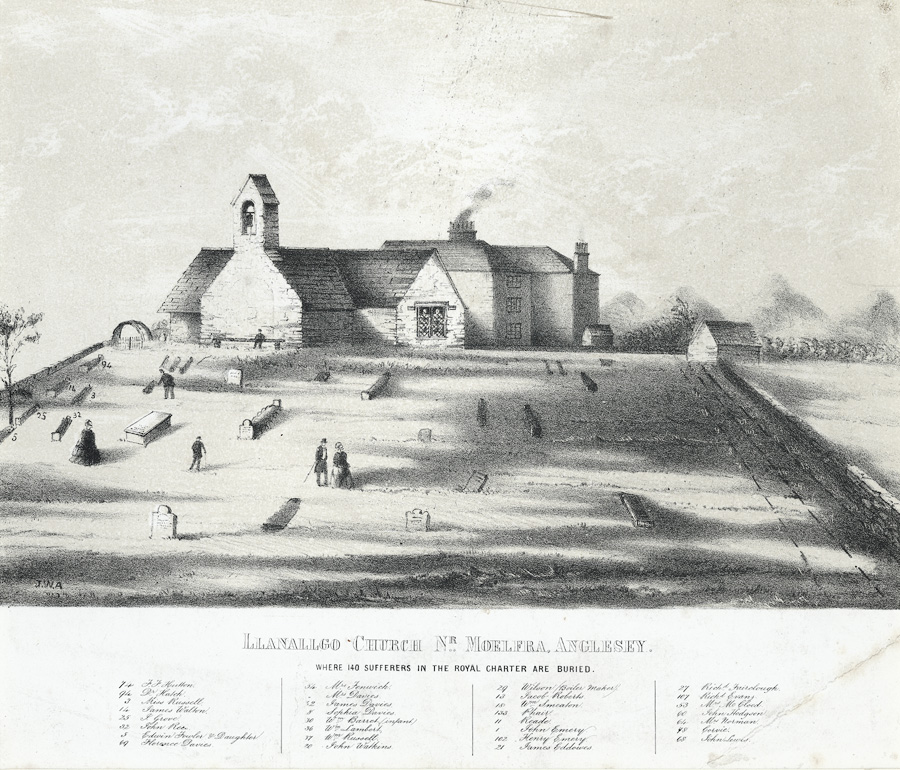
Black and white print on lithograph c. 1860.

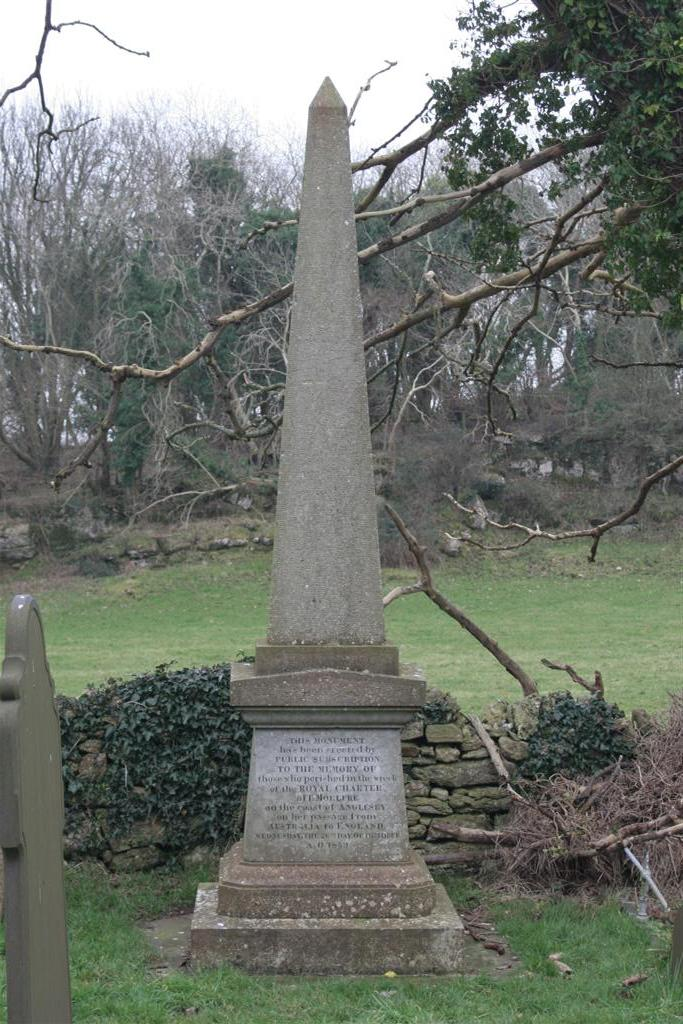
The memorial to victims of the wreck of the Royal Charter

The churchyard contains 140 victims of the sinking of the Royal Charter off Anglesey in October 1859, and an obelisk commemorates the loss. Over 440 passengers and crew died. Stephen Roose Hughes was the rector at the time of the accident. St Gallgo's was used as a temporary mortuary as bodies were recovered from the sea. Hughes and his brother Hugh, who was rector of an adjoining parish, conducted many of the funeral services. Hughes wrote over 1,000 letters to people enquiring for news of relatives and friends, and comforted many who visited Anglesey. Charles Dickens stayed with Hughes when he visited Anglesey to write about the sinking; his experiences were published in The Uncommercial Traveller. He recorded the care that Hughes took to try and identify victims from their possessions and physical characteristics. Hughes died three years later; the strain of the events was noted on his gravestone in the churchyard as one of the reasons for his early death. He is remembered in St Gallgo's on the anniversary of his death, 4 February. The churchyard also contains two Commonwealth war graves, of a Royal Engineers soldier of World War I and a Merchant Navy sailor of World War II.

The poet Dafydd Trefor is recorded in a list of clergy for the Bangor diocese of 1504 as being rector of St Gallgo's and St Eugrad's, and signed himself as such in a deed of 1524; he was buried in the churchyard. The poet and historian John Williams (better known by his bardic name "Glanmor") was rector of the two churches from 1883 until his death in 1891; he too is buried at Llanallgo.

St Gallgo's is still used for worship by the Church in Wales. It is one of four churches in the combined benefice of Llaneugrad and Llanallgo with Penrhosllugwy with Llanfihangel Tre'r Beirdd. It is within the deanery of Twrcelyn, the archdeaconry of Bangor and the Diocese of Bangor. As of 2012, the position of rector is vacant. The pattern of services in 2012 is for two services every Sunday morning, alternating between a communion service and morning prayer, in English at 8.30am and in Welsh at 10am. There is also a twice-monthly evening service (in English), and a midweek communion service in the church hall in Moelfre. Services are led by retired clergy and lay readers.

== Architecture and fittings ==
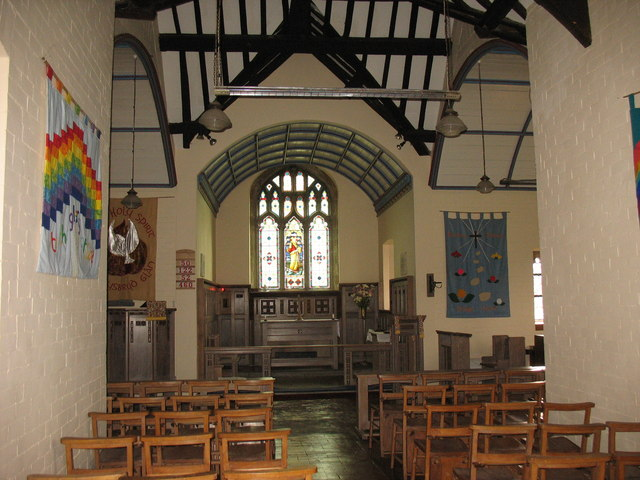
The interior, looking towards the east end

The church is built in the Perpendicular style from rubble masonry; the roof is made of slate with a stone bellcote at the west end and stone cross finials. The church is built in a cross shape, with transepts to the north and south of the chancel. Entrance is through a porch on the north side of the nave, where the doorway has been built reusing older stones. The interior walls of the nave and transepts are lined with painted bricks. The supporting timber braces of the nave roof can be seen from inside the church; the roof trusses in the chancel and transepts are covered by barrel-shaped boarded ceilings. The chancel floor is made from local limestone. The east window of the chancel dates from the 15th century, although the tracery is more recent. It has stained glass portraying Christ walking on the water giving a blessing and the word "It is I, be not afraid". The east windows in both the north and south transepts are each topped with a cinquefoil. The nave windows date from the late 19th century.

The bell is one of the oldest in the diocese, dating from the late 13th century. It bears the imprint of a penny from the reign of King Edward I (reigned 1272–1307) and the Latin inscription AVE MARIA GRACIA PLENA ("Hail Mary full of grace"). Restoration of the bell in 2000 cost £3,000. The reredos, altar, communion rail, pulpit and reading desk (all from the early 20th century) are made from limed oak in an Arts and Crafts style, with floral decorations. The north transept has a stone memorial on the north wall to a former rector, Lewis Owen, and his grandson, who both died in 1771. The font is modern. A 1937 survey by the Royal Commission on Ancient and Historical Monuments in Wales and Monmouthshire noted a 1726 communion table and a number of memorials from the 17th, 18th and early 19th centuries.

The chancel measures 12 by 12 feet 6 inches (3.65 by 3.8m); the north transept is 17 by 14 feet 6 inches (5.2 by 4.4m); the south transept is slightly smaller, at 17 by 14 feet (5.2 by 4.25m); and the nave after its 1892 extension is now twice as long as the chancel, at 24 by 12 feet (7.3 by 3.7 m).

== Assessment ==
The church has national recognition and statutory protection from alteration as it has been designated as a Grade II listed building – the lowest of the three grades of listing, designating "buildings of special interest, which warrant every effort being made to preserve them". It was given this status on 12 May 1970, and has been listed as "a rural church with strong Perpendicular character". Cadw (the Welsh Assembly Government body responsible for the built heritage of Wales and the inclusion of Welsh buildings on the statutory lists) also notes that it retains some features from the late 15th century.

Angharad Llwyd, writing shortly after the 1831 restoration, described the church as "a small and handsome structure", and she recorded the presence of some "ancient" stained glass in the east window. Writing in 1859, the clergyman and antiquarian Harry Longueville Jones said that the church, although small, was one of the "better kind" in Anglesey. He thought that the walls had been lowered after being built, because the top of the east window was too close to the roof, which in his view could not have been the original intention. At the time he wrote there were the remains of a screen between the nave and the chancel, but it is no longer present. Overall, he commented, "the workmanship of this church is more careful than usual, and shows that it was erected by some person of munificent disposition".

The Welsh politician and church historian Sir Stephen Glynne visited the church in 1868, and noted that the church had been altered less than most of the other churches in Anglesey. He thought that the west window was "modern and bad", but that the east window of the chancel was "very good". He added that the church needed repair, as the interior was "very rough".
