= Richard Evans (lifeboatman) =

Welsh lifeboatman

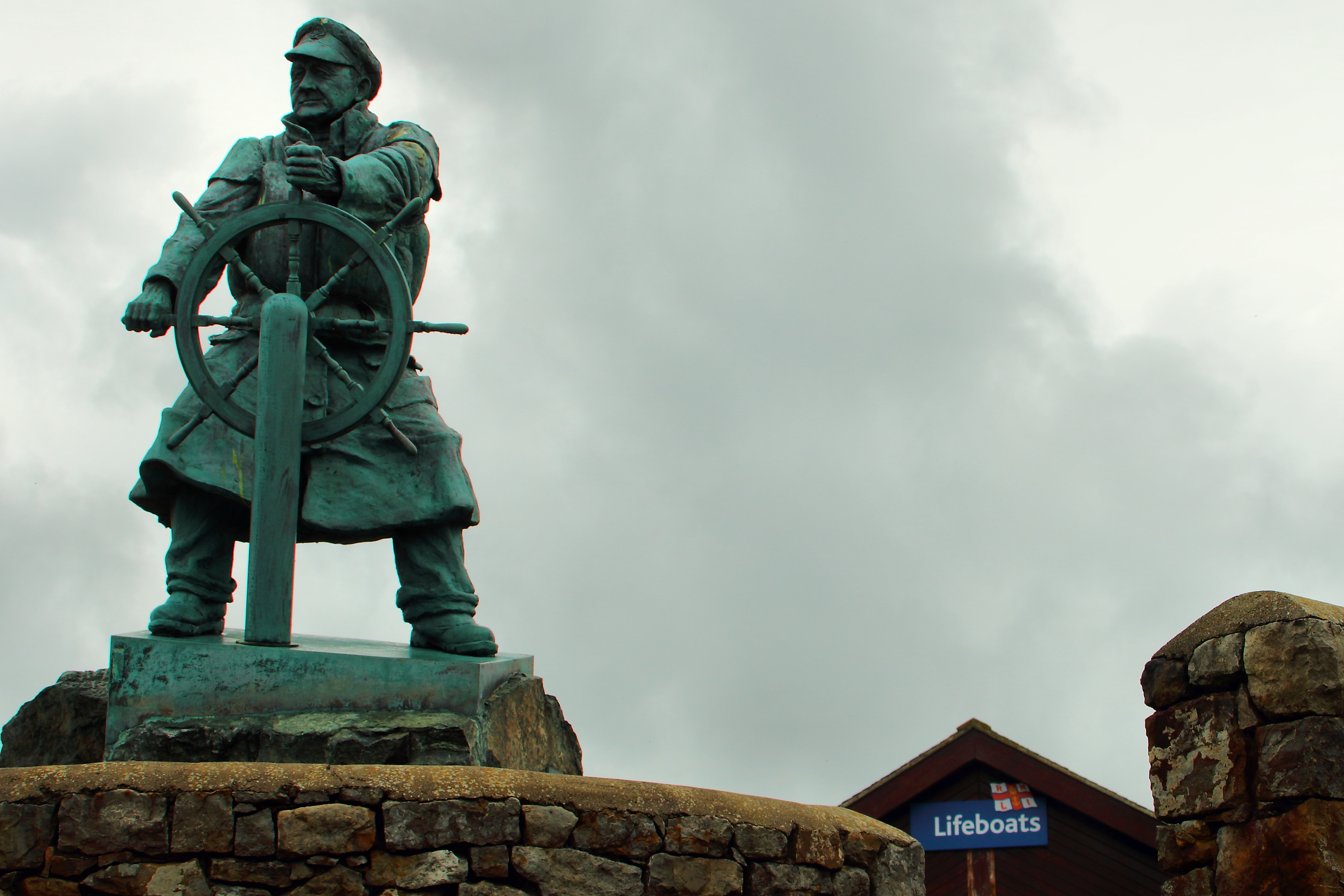
Bronze statue of Richard Evans at Moelfre lifeboat station

Richard Matthew Evans (BEM), (January 19, 1905 – September 13, 2001) was a Welsh lifeboatman. He was born in the village of Moelfre on the north-east of the island of Anglesey. During his 50 years service as a lifeboatman, Richard Evans was involved in 179 launches and the saving of 281 lives and is one of only five men to be awarded the RNLI gold medal twice, the highest accolade awarded by the institution and the equivalent of the Victoria Cross for bravery at sea.

== Life ==
Richard Evans was born and raised in the village of Moelfre on the island of Anglesey. The son of a merchant seaman, Richard followed his father into the profession at the age of 14, taking command of the MV Colin at the age of 23. He later took over the running of the family butchers shop and served as a signalman in the Home Guard during the second World War. He married his wife, Nansi Thomas in 1933 and they had three sons, David, Derek and William. Following his retirement in 1970, Evans was involved in fund raising for the RNLI as well as appearing on television and radio, including being featured on This Is Your Life in 1970. Richard died at the age of 96.

== Service in the RNLI ==
The tradition of serving in the Royal National Lifeboat Institution (RNLI) went back many generations in Richard Evans' family, with one of his ancestors being involved in the rescue from the wreck of the Royal Charter in October 1859. Both Richard's grandfathers had served in the crew of the Moelfre lifeboat and when he himself joined at the age of 17, his father was a crewman and his uncle was the coxswain. Richard's three sons also followed their father into the service Throughout the second World War, Richard was the second coxswain, being promoted to coxswain on the retirement of his uncle in 1954. During his 50 years service Richard was involved in 179 rescues and the saving of over 200 lives.

== Awards ==
- 1940 Thanks of the RNLI on vellum for involvement in the rescue of 60 crew from the SS Geleden which had been torpedoed and had run aground in the Menai Straits.
- 1943 RNLI Bronze Medal for role in rescue of airman from a crashed Whitley bomber.
- 1959 RNLI Gold Medal for actions as the coxswain of the lifeboat leading to the rescue of the entire crew from the MV Hindlea which was being dragged onto the rocks from its anchorage in a severe storm and heavy seas.
- 1960 Queen's silver medal for gallantry at sea
- 1966 RNLI Gold medal for rescue of crew from the disabled and drifting Greek vessel Nafisporos
- 1969 British Empire Medal
- In 1978 Evans was also made an Honorary Bard at the National Eisteddfod of Wales held in Cardiff

== Memorial Statue ==
On 23 November 2004, a bronze statue in memory of Richard (Dic) Evans, situated adjacent to the Moelfre lifeboat station was unveiled by Prince Charles, the Prince of Wales. The statue stands 7 ft high on a granite plinth and was created by Sam Holland.

== Bibliography ==
- Leach, N., Moelfre Lifeboats: an illustrated history (Lichfield: Foxglove Publishing Ltd. 2015)
- Morris, J., The Story of the Moelfre Lifeboats (Coventry: J. Morris, 2003)
- Roberts, O., 'Lifeboatman Richard M Evans BEM of Moelfre', Cymru a'r Môr 23(2002), 30–31
- Skidmore, I., Lifeboat VC: The Story of Coxswain Dic Evans, BEM, and his many rescues (London: Pan Books, 1980)
