= Sam Holland (sculptor) =

British sculptor

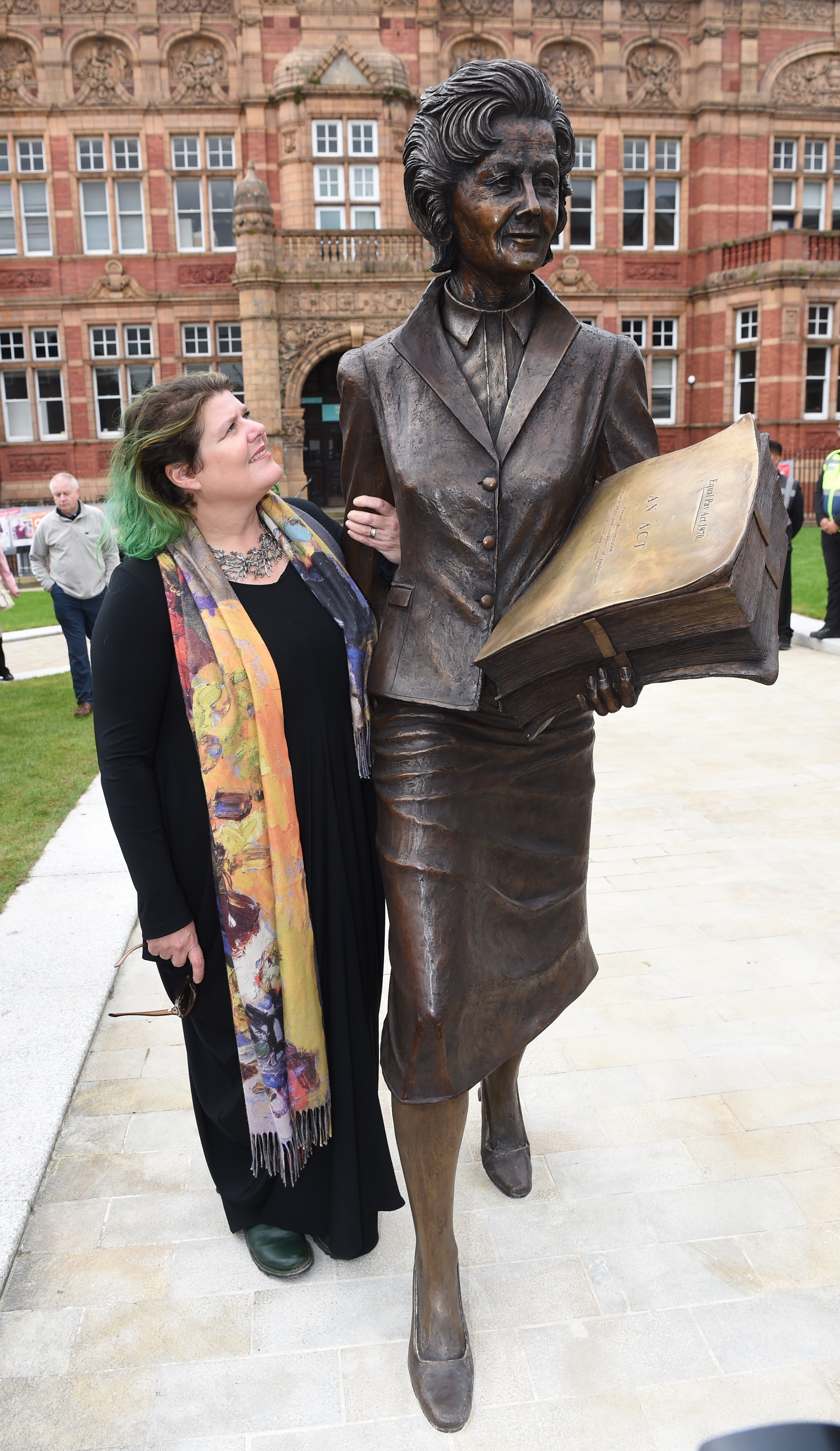
- Holland at the unveiling of her statue of Barbara Castle, in Blackburn on 9 October 2021
- Known for: Sculpture
- Notable work: Bronze statues

Samantha "Sam" Holland is a British sculptor.

Holland studied Fine Art Sculpture at the City & Guilds of London Art School gaining a first class degree. In 2001, she became a member of the Royal Society of British Sculptors.

Her commissions include statues of the founder of The Football League, William McGregor at Villa Park, Birmingham Dick Evans at Moelfre, Anglesey, the RNLI memorial sculpture outside the RNLI Headquarters in Poole, Dorset and a statue of politician Barbara Castle in Jubilee Square, Blackburn.

== Personal life ==
Holland is married with two children.

== Gallery ==
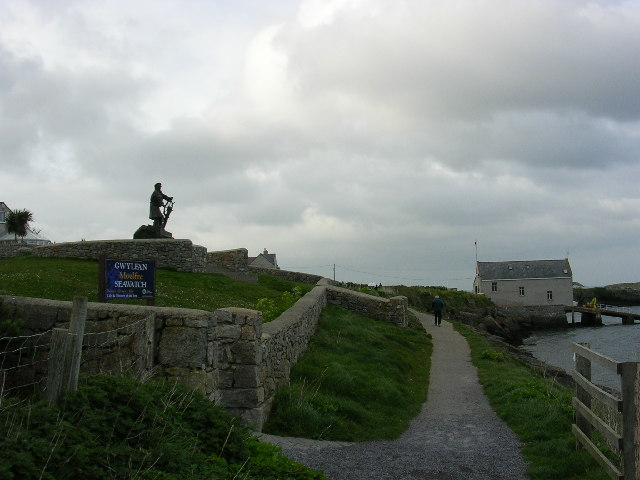
Dick Evans statue at Moelfre

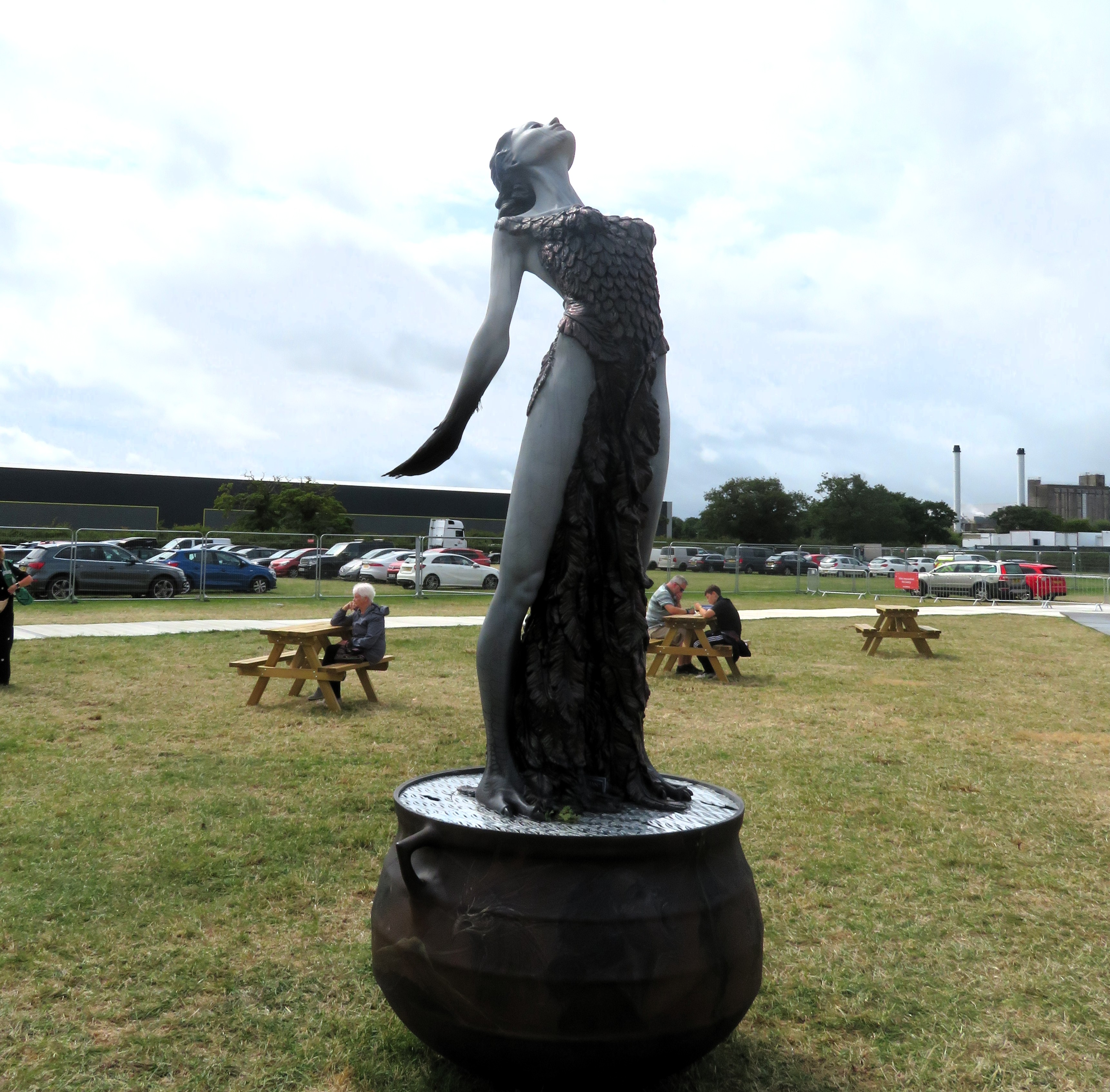
Sculpture of the Goddess Ceridwen at the 2025 National Eisteddfod in Wrexham

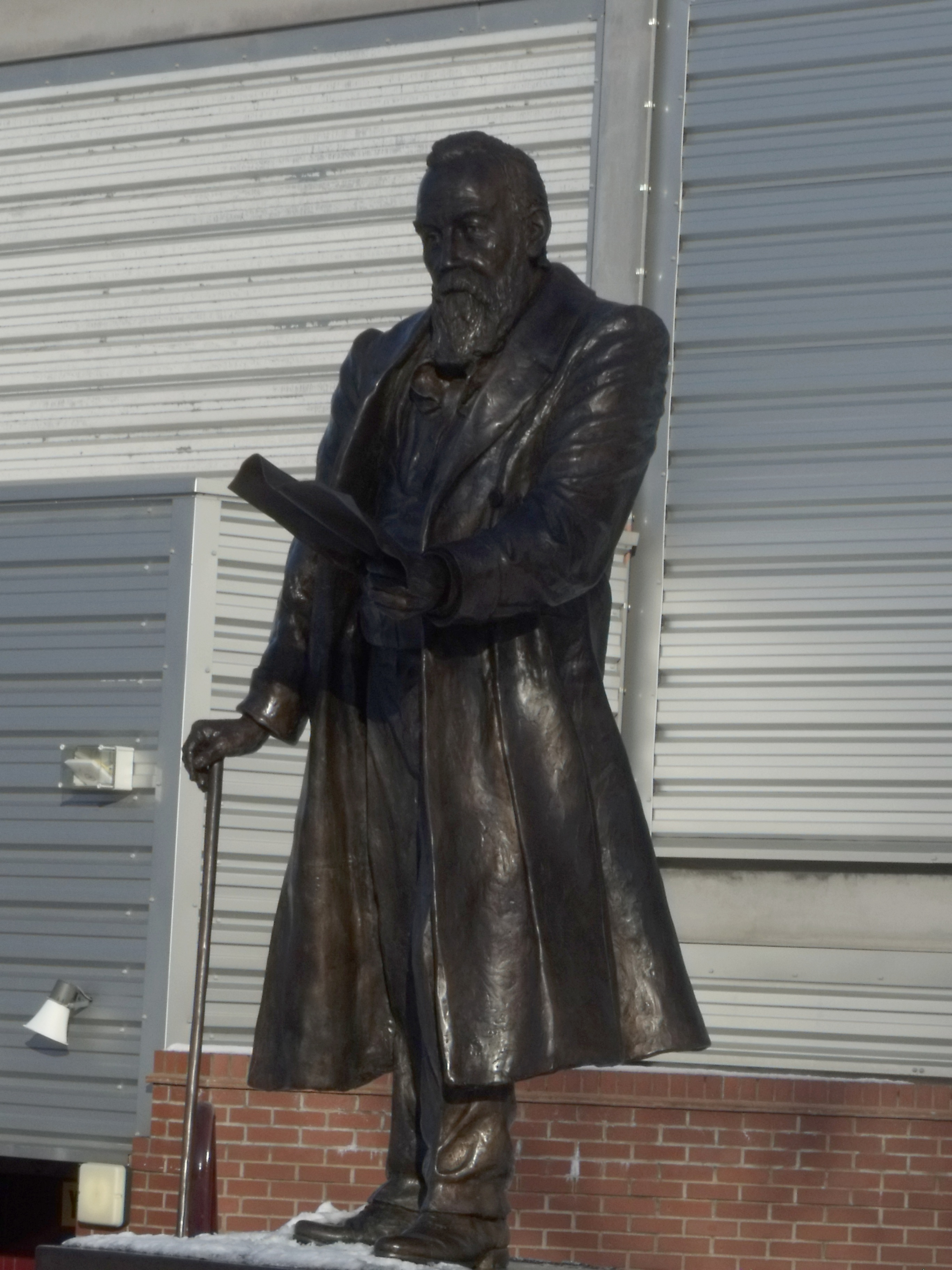
Statue of William McGregor, Villa Park, Birmingham
