= Llan (placename) =

Placename element in Celtic languages

Llan (Welsh pronunciation: [ɬan]) and its variants (Breton: lan; Cornish: lann; Pictish: lhan; Irish and Scottish Gaelic: lann) are a common element of Celtic placenames in the British Isles and Brittany, especially of Welsh toponymy. In Welsh the (often mutated) name of a local saint or a geomorphological description (Note: A number of placenames now beginning with llan owe their present form to confusion, having originated as glan ("river bank") or nant ("stream, hollow"). An example is Llanbradach, which was originally Nant Bradach ("valley of the Bradach"). An example in Cornish is Lanteglos, from an original Nanseglos ("church valley").) follows the Llan morpheme to form a single word: for example Llanfair is the parish or settlement around the church of St. Mair (Welsh for "Mary"). Goidelic toponyms end in -lann.

The various forms of the word are distantly cognate with English land and lawn and presumably initially denoted a specially cleared and enclosed area of land. In late antiquity it came to be applied particularly to the sanctified land occupied by communities of Christian converts. It is part of the name of more than 630 locations in Wales and nearly all have some connection with a local patron saint. These were usually the founding saints of the parish. The founder of a new llan was obliged to reside at the site and to eat only once a day, each time taking a bit of bread and an egg and drinking only water and milk. This lasted for forty days, Sundays excepted, after which the land was considered sanctified for ever. The typical llan employed or erected a circular or oval embankment with a protective stockade, surrounded by wooden or stone huts. Unlike Saxon practice, these establishments were not chapels for the local lords but almost separate tribes, initially some distance away from the secular community. Over time, however, it became common for prosperous communities to become either monasteries forbidden to lay residents or fully secular communities controlled by the local lord.

In the later Middle Ages llan also came to denote entire parishes, both as an ecclesiastical region and as a subdivision of a commote or hundred.

== Place names in Wales ==
=== Places named after saints ===
- Llanaelhaearn, Saint Aelhaiarn
- Llanafan Fawr 'Great Llanafan', Saint Afan
- Llanafan Fechan 'Little Llanafan' (now often 'Llanfechan'), Saint Afan
- Llanafan y Trawsgoed (alternatively, Llanafan, Ceredigion), Saint Afan
- Llanallgo, Saint Gallgo see St Gallgo's Church
- Llanarmon, Gwynedd, Saint Garmon
- Llanarmon Dyffryn Ceiriog, Saint Garmon
- Llanarmon Mynydd Mawr, Saint Garmon
- Llanarmon-yn-Iâl, Denbighshire, Saint Garmon or St. Germanus of Auxerre
- Llanarthney, St Arthney
- Llanasa, Saint Asaph
- Llanbabo, Saint Pabo
- Llanbadarn Fawr, Ceredigion, Saint Padarn
- Llanbadarn Fawr, Powys St Padarn
- Llanbadarn Fynydd, Saint Padarn
- Llanbadarn y Garreg, Saint Padarn
- Llanbadoc, Saint Madoc see St Madoc's Church, Llanbadoc
- Llanbadrig, Saint Patrick
- Llanbedr or Llanbeder, Newport St Peter
- Llanbedr, Saint Peter
- Llanbedr, Crickhowell St Peter
- Llanbedr (Radnorshire), Saint Peter
- Llanbedr Dyffryn Clwyd, Saint Peter
- Llanbedrgoch, Saint Peter
- Llanbedrog, Saint Petroc
- Llanbedr-y-cennin, Saint Peter
- Llanbedr Pont Steffan, St Peter
- Llanbeulan, Saint Peulan
- Llanberis, Saint Peris
- Llanblethian, Saint Bleiddian
- Llanbrynmair, Saint Mary
- Llandanwg, Saint Tanwg
- Llandecwyn, Saint Tecwyn
- Llandefaelog Fach, Powys, St Maelog
- Llandegveth, St Tegvedd
- Llanddeiniol, St Deiniol
- Llanddeiniolen, Saint Deiniol
- Llandderfel, Saint Derfel
- Llanddeusant, Anglesey, two saints: Saint Marcellus and Saint Marcellina
- Llanddeusant, Carmarthenshire, two saints: Saint David and Saint Teilo
- Llanddew, St David
- Llanddewi Nant Honddu (Llanthony), St David
- Llandegfan Saint Tegfan
- Llandegla, Saint Tegla
- Llandegley, Saint Tegla
- Llandeilo, Saint Teilo
- Llandeilo'r-Fan Saint Teilo
- Llanddaniel Fab Saint Deiniol Fab see St Deiniol's Church, Llanddaniel Fab
- Llanddewi, St David
- Llanddewi Brefi, Saint David
- Llanddewi'r Cwm, St David
- Llanddewi Rhydderch, St David
- Llanddewi Velfrey, St David
- Llanddewi Ystradenni, St David
- Llanddoged, Saint Doged
- Llanddona, Saint Dona see St Dona's Church, Llanddona
- Llanddwywe, Saint Dwywe
- Llanddyfnan, Saint Dyfnan
- Llandetty, Saint Detyw and Saint Tetta
- Llandissilio, Saint Tysilio
- Llandogo, in Welsh Llaneuddogwy, St Euddogwy (Oudoceus)
- Llandough, Llanfair, Saint Dochau/Dochdwy
- Llandough, Penarth, Saint Dochau/Dochdwy
- Llandrillo, Denbighshire, Saint Trillo
- Llandrillo yn Rhos, Saint Trillo
- Llandrinio, Saint Trunio
- Llandudoch, Saint Dogmael
- Llandudno, Saint Tudno
- Llandwrog, Saint Twrog
- Llandybie, Saint Tybie
- Llandyfaelog, St Maelog
- Llandyfan, St Dyfan
- Llandyfriog, Saint Brioc
- Llandyfrydog, Saint Tyfrydog see St Tyfrydog's Church, Llandyfrydog
- Llandygai, Saint Tegai
- Llandyrnog, Saint Tyrnog
- Llandysilio, Saint Tysilio
- Llandyssil, Saint Tysul
- Llandysul, Saint Tysul
- Llanelieu, St Ellyw see St Ellyw's Church, Llanelieu
- Llanelltyd, Saint Illtud
- Llanenddwyn, Saint Enddwyn
- Llanfachreth, Saint Machreth, (derived from the Welsh soft mutation of that saint's name, and not to be confused with Llanfachraeth which is from fach, 'small', and (t)raeth, 'beach'
- Llanfaelog, Saint Maelog
- Llanfaelrhys, Saint Maelrhys
- Llanfaethlu, Saint Maethlu see St Maethlu's Church, Llanfaethlu
- Llanfairfechan `Little Saint Marys Parish`
- Llanfaglan, Saint Baglan
- Llanfallteg, Llanfallteg West, St Mallteg
- Llanfechell, Saint Mechell
- Llanfflewyn Saint Fflewin See St Fflewin's Church, Llanfflewin
- Llanfigael, Saint Figael see St Figael's Church, Llanfigael
- Llanfoist, St Ffwyst
- Llanfwrog, Anglesey Saint Mwrog
- Llanfwrog, Denbighshire Saint Mwrog
- Llanedi, Saint Edith
- Llanedeyrn, Saint Edeyrn
- Llanedwen, St. Edwen see St Edwen's Church, Llanedwen
- Llanengan Einion Frenin, also known as Engan
- Llannefydd, Saint Nefydd
- Llanegryn, Saint Egryn
- Llanegwad, Saint Egwad
- Llaneilian, Saint Eilian
- Llanelian-yn-rhos, a former civil parish in Conwy County Borough, Saint Elian (Wales)
- Llanelidan, Saint Elidan see St Elidan's Church, Llanelidan
- Llanellen, Saint Elen, often anglicised as St Helen
- Llanelli, Saint Elli
- Llanelly, St Elli
- Llanelwedd, Saint Elwedd
- Llanelwy, Saint Asaph
- Llanenddwyn, Saint Enddwyn
- Llanerfyl, Saint Erfyl
- Llaneuddog, Saint Euddog
- Llanfair, Gwynedd, St Mary
- Llanfair Caereinion, St Mary
- Llanfair Clydogau, St Mary
- Llanfair Dyffryn Clwyd, Saint Mary
- Llanfair-Nant-Gwyn St Mary
- Llanfairpwllgwyngyllgogerychwyrndrobwllllantysiliogogogoch, Saint Mary and Saint Tysilio
- Llanfair Talhaiarn St Mary, Saint Alhaiarn(?)
- Llanfair-yng-Nghornwy Saint Mary
- Llanfechan or Llanafan Fechan, Saint Afan
- Llanferres, Saint Berres (Brice of Tours) see St Berres' Church, Llanferres
- Llanfihangel-ar-Arth, Saint Michael, the Archangel
- Llanvihangel Crucorney, St Michael, the Archangel
- Llanfihangel Glyn Myfyr, the Archangel, Michael (Mihangel)
- Llanfihangel Rhydithon, St Michael, the Archangel
- Llanfihangel Nant Brân, St Michael, the Archangel
- Llanfihangel Nant Melan, St Michael, the Archangel
- Llanfihangel Rogiet, see St Michael and All Angels Church, Llanfihangel Rogiet
- Llanfihangel-uwch-Gwili, St Michael, the Archangel
- Llanfihangel Talyllyn, St Michael (Mihangel) and All Angels
- Llanfihangel y Creuddyn, St Michael (archangel)
- Llanfihangel-yng-Ngwynfa, St Michael, the Archangel
- Llanfihangel-y-Pennant, St Michael, the Archangel
- Llanfihangel-y-Pennant, Dolbenmaen, St Michael, the Archangel
- Llanfihangel Ysgeifiog, St Michael and All Angels
- Llanfihangel-y-Traethau, Saint Michael, the Archangel
- Llanfihangel yn Nhowyn, St Michael, (Mihangel) the Archangel
- Llanfilo, Saint Bilo
- Llanfoist, Saint Fwyst
- Llanfrothen, Saint Brothen see St Brothen's Church, Llanfrothen
- Llanfrynach Saint Brynach
- Llanfyllin, Saint Myllin
- Llanfynydd, Mountain Church
- Llanfyrnach, Saint Brynach
- Llangadfan, Saint Cadfan
- Llangadog, Saint Cadoc
- Llangadwaladr, Saint Cadwaladr
- Llangadwaladr, Powys, Saint Cadwaladr
- Llangaffo, Saint Caffo see St Caffo's Church, Llangaffo
- Llangain, Saint Cain
- Llangammarch Wells, St Cadmarch
- Llangain, St Cain
- Llangan, St Canna
- Llanganten, St Cannen
- Llangasty Tal-y-Llyn St Gastyn
- Llangathen, Saint Cathen
- Llangattock-Vibon-Avel, St Cadoc (Cattwg)
- Llangattock Lingoed, St Cadoc
- Llangattock (Crickhowell), St Cadoc
- Llangedwyn Saint Cedwyn see St Cedwyn's Church, Llangedwyn
- Llangeinor, St Ceinwyr
- Llangeinwen, Saint Ceinwen
- Llangeitho, Saint Ceitho
- Llangeler, Saint Celer
- Llangelynnin, Saint Celynin
- Llangelynnin, Gwynedd, Saint Celynin
- Llangennech, Saint Cennych
- Llangennith, Saint Cenydd
- Llangenny St.Cenau or Saint Keyne
- Llangian, Saint Cian
- Llangiwg near Pontardawe, St Ciwg
- Llangloffan, Saint Cloffan (fictitious)
- Llanglydwen, St Clydwen
- Llangollen, Saint Collen
- Llangolman, Colmán of Dromore
- Llangovan, Saint Govan
- Llangrannog, Saint Carannog
- Llanrhian, Saint Rhian
- Llangristiolus Saint Cristiolus
- Llangunllo, Saint Cynllo
- Llangunnor, Saint Ceinwr
- Llangurig, Saint Curig
- Llangwyfan, Aberffraw Saint Cwyfan see St Cwyfan's Church, Llangwyfan
- Llangwyfan, Denbighshire, Denbighshire, Saint Cwyfan
- Llangwyfan, Aberffraw, Saint Cwyfan
- Llangwnnadl, Saint Gwynhoedl
- Llangwyryfon, Saint Ursula
- Llangwyllog Saint Cwyllog
- Llangybi (Llangybi, Monmouthshire, Llangybi, Gwynedd and Llangybi, Ceredigion) Saint Cybi (or Cuby)
- Llangyfelach, Saint Cyfelach
- Llangyndeyrn, Saint Cyndeyrn
- Llangynfelyn, Saint Cynfelyn
- Llangynhafal, Saint Cynhafal
- Llangynidr, St Cynidr
- Llangynin, Saint Cynin
- Llangynog, Saint Cynog
- Llangynog, Carmarthenshire St Cynog
- Llangynwyd, Saint Cynwyd
- Llangystennin, Mochdre, Conwy St. Cystennin (Constantine)
- Llangywer, Saint Cywair
- Llanharan, Saint Aaron
- Llanhennock, Saint Henwg
- Llanhilleth, From Welsh `Llanheledd` 'Church of Saint Heledd`
- Llanidan, St. Nidan
- Llanidloes, Saint Idloes
- Llaniestyn, Anglesey, Saint Iestyn
- Llaniestyn, Gwynedd, Saint Iestyn
- Llanigon, Saint Eigon
- Llanilar, Saint Ilar
- Llanilid, St Ilid
- Llanishen (Llanisien), Saint Isan
- Llanishen, Monmouthshire, St Isan
- Llanismel, anglicised as 'St Ishmaels', Pembrokeshire, Saint Ismael (Saint Isfael)
- Llanismel, anglicised as 'St Ishmael', Carmarthenshire, Saint Ismael
- Llanllawddog, Saint Llawddog
- Llanllechid, Saint Llechid
- Llanllibio, Saint Llibio
- Llanllowell, Saint Llywel
- Llanllwchaiarn, Saint Llwchaiarn see St Llwchaiarn's Church, Llanllwchaiarn
- Llanllwchaiarn, Ceredigion
- Llanllwni, St Llwni
- Llanmadoc, Saint Madoc
- Llanmartin, Saint Martin
- Llanmihangel, Vale of Glamorgan, St Michael, the Archangel
- Llannefydd, Conwy County Borough Saint Nefydd
- Llannon, Saint Non
- Llanon, Saint Non
- Llanwnnog, Saint Gwynog
- Llanpumsaint, five saints: Gwyn, Gwynno, Gwynoro, Ceithio and Celynin
- Llanrhian, Saint Rhian
- Llanrhidian, St Rhidian
- Llanrhychwyn, Saint Rhychwyn
- Llanrhyddlad, Saint Rhyddlad
- Llanrhystud, St Rhystyd
- Llanrwst, Saint Grwst
- Llansadurnen, St Sadurnen
- Llansadwrn, Anglesey, Saint Sadwrn see St Sadwrn's Church, Llansadwrn
- Llansadwrn St Sadwrn
- Llansamlet, Saint Samlet
- Llansanffraid Glan Conwy Brigid of Kildare (Saint Ffraid)
- Llansannan, Saint Sannan
- Llansannor, St Senwyr
- Llansantffraed, (Talybont-on Usk) St Ffraid
- Llansantffraid, Ceredigion, St Ffraed
- Llansanffraid Cwmdauddwr St Fraid
- Llansantffraid Glyn Ceiriog, St Fraid
- Llansantffraed-in-Elwell, St Ffraed
- Llansantffraed, Monmouthshire, St Brigid (Ffraid/Bride/Bhrid)
- Llansantffraid-ym-Mechain, Saint Ffraid
- Llansawel, Saint Sawell
- Llansilin, Saint Silin
- Llanspyddid, St Ysbyddyd
- Llanstadwell, St Tudwal
- Llansteffan, Saint Stephen
- Llanstephan, Powys, St Stephen (or Ystyffan)
- Llanstinan, St Justinian
- Llantilio Crossenny St Teilo
- Llantilio Pertholey St Teilo
- Llantood, The name of the hamlet is assumed to derive from the 5th century saint, Illtyd
- Llantrisant, three saints: Illtud, Gwynno and Dyfodwg
- Llantrisant, Anglesey, three saints: Afran, (possibly a variant of Afan) Ieuan, and Sana
- Llantrisant, Monmouthshire, three saints: St Peter, St Paul and St John
- Llantrithyd, of St Illtyd
- Llantwit Major (Welsh: Llanilltud Fawr), Saint Illtud
- Llantwit Fardre ('Llanilltud on the Prince's own farm'; from faerdref: [on the] 'land (or farm) of the prince'), Saint Illtud
- Llantysilio, Saint Tysilio
- Llanvaches, Saint Maches
- Llanvair Discoed, St Mary
- Llanvapley, St Mable see St Mapley's Church, Llanvapley
- Llanvetherine, Saint Gwytherin
- Llanvihangel Gobion, St Michael, the Archangel
- Llanvihangel-Ystern-Llewern, St Michael, the Archangel
- Llanwddyn, Saint Wddyn
- Llanwenog, Saint Gwenog see St Gwenog's Church, Llanwenog
- Llanwinio, Saint Gwinio/Gwynno
- Llanwnnen, Saint Gwynin
- Llanwrda, St Cwrdaf
- Llanwrin, Saint Gwrin
- Llanwrthwl, Saint Gwrthwl
- Llanwyddelan, Saint Wyddelan
- Llanynghenedl, Saint Enghenedl see St Enghenedl's Church, Llanynghenedl
- Llanyre, Saint Llyr

=== Place names with religious connections other than a saint ===
- Llandaff, named after the River Taff, or possibly Saint Dyfan
- Llanddarog, uncertain; church dedicated to Saint Twrog
- Llandow, derives from Llandhuw, meaning Church of God
- Llandrindod, named after the Trinity (Welsh: y Drindod)
- Llanfachraeth, fach, 'small', and (t)raeth, 'beach', meaning 'place, or church, of the little beach'
- Llanfaes, 'church of the field' from llan + maes, 'field'. (Originally dedicated to Saint Fagan)
- Llanfarian after Capel Marian
- Llangefni, named after the River Cefni. (Previously known as Llangyngar, after Saint Cyngar)
- Llangorwen possibly from corwen, meaning 'white church or choir'
- Llanllugan See Llanllugan Abbey
- Llansaint possibly named after a holy well, Ffynnon Saint ('saint's well')
- Llansoy, after Tysoi, thought to have been a pupil of St. Dyfrig.
- Llantarnam
- Llanybydder, "the church of the deaf ones"
- Llanymynech (part) `Church of the Monks`

=== Place names without a religious connection ===
- Bwlch-Llan, Ceredigion
- Landimore from Mor- Sea
- Llan, Powys
- Llanaber
- Llanaeron, after the River Aeron
- Llanarmon-yn-Ial named after St Germanus of Auxerre and a commote of Medieval Wales
- Llanarth, Ceredigion, named for the River Arth whose outlet into Cardigan Bay is nearby
- Llanarth, Monmouthshire, from earlier (recorded 12th century) form 'Llangarth', possibly meaning either "church on the ridge of the hill” or “church with a garth (yard)"
- Llanbister
- Llanboidy uncertain
- Llanbradach, name evolved from Nant Bradach
- Llancarfan, name evolved from Nantcarfan
- Llancayo
- Llancoch (Radnorshire), coch, 'red'
- Llandarcy, named after William Knox D'Arcy
- Llandenny
- Llanddulas, named after the River Dulas
- Llandinam,
- Llandovery, a corruption of Llanymddyfri, in English: 'Church enclosure amidst the waters'
- Llandre, from dref, 'town'; formerly, Llanfihangel Genau'r Glyn.
- Llandynan
- Llaneglwys, Brecknockshire – llan + eglwys, 'church'
- Llanerch, Powys
- Llanerchaeron, Ceredigion, mansion estate adjacent to River Aeron
- Llanfachraeth, fach, 'small', and (t)raeth, 'beach'
- Llanfaenor (Monmouthshire) see Llangattock-Vibon-Avel, faenor, 'manor'
- Llanfaes, Brecon faes or maes, 'field'
- Llanfair-yn-Neubwll neubwll, 'aeroplane', referring to nearby RAF Valley.
- Llanfaredd, from the Fareth, a small stream.
- Llanfechain
- Llanfendigaid Estate
- Llan Ffestiniog
- Llanfor
- Llanfynydd, Flintshire, fynydd, 'mountain'
- Llanfynydd
- Llangadwaladr after King Cadwaladr
- Llangefni, Anglesey, named from River Cefni
- Llangernyw named after the area of Cernyw
- Llangoed The village's placename means the 'religious enclosure in the wood' in the Welsh language.
- Llangoedmor in Ceredigion, originally Llangoedmawr, 'great wood'
- Llangors, cors, 'marsh'
- Llangwm, Conwy, cwm, 'valley'
- Llangwm, Pembrokeshire
- Llangwm, Monmouthshire
- Llanharry
- Llanllwch
- Llanllyfni, Gwynedd, llan on the River Llyfni
- Llanmaes
- Llanmerewig
- Llan-mill, Pembrokeshire
- Llanmiloe named after Llanmiloe House
- Llanmorlais, name evolved from Glan Morlais
- Llannor
- Llannerch-y-medd
- Llanrhaeadr-yng-Nghinmeirch
- Llanrhaeadr-ym-Mochnant, Montgomeryshire, llan + rhaeadr: '(waterfall) in the cantref of' Mochnant
- Llanrhos, also known as Eglwys Rhos
- Llanrhyddlad
- Llanrug, (former name: "Llanfihangel-y-Rug")
- Llanrumney, named after River Rhymney (rebracketed from "Glanrhymni", lit. bank of the Rhymney, due to mutation of "Glan-", to "Lan-" after certain prepositions (e.g. "o Lanrhymni", "from Glanrhymni"), confused for the mutation (or mispronunciation) of "Llan-" as "Lan-" in the same circumstances)
- Llanteg
- Llanuwchllyn, Gwynedd, llan + uwch + llyn: llan 'above the lake'
- Llanymawddwy, Gwynedd, from llan + ym + Mawddwy: llan 'in the district of Mawddwy'
- Llanwern, Llanywern (Breconshire), 'church on the marshy ground'
- Llanwnda, Gwynedd
- Llanwnda, Pembrokeshire, named after Garn Wnda burial chamber
- Llanwrtyd, Llanwrtyd Wells Personal name `Gwrtyd`?
- Llanycefn, cefn, 'cave'
- Llanychaer, originally from Llannerch caith (lit. glade of bondsmen), but re-interpreted due to sound change as Llan y caer (lit. church of the fortress)
- Llanycil
- Llanynys, ynys, 'island'
- Llanyrafon, afon, 'river'
- Llanystumdwy, Gwynedd, from llan + ystum + Dwy: llan on the meander of the river Dwy

=== Place names in counties bordering Wales ===
- Lancaut (Welsh: Llan Cewydd), Gloucestershire
- Llancillo, Herefordshire
- Landican (Birkenhead, Merseyside), Saint Tegan
- Llandinabo, Herefordshire
- Llancloudy, Herefordshire
- Llanfair, site of St Mary's church, near Clifford Castle in Clifford, Herefordshire, Wye Valley
- Llanfair Waterdine, Shropshire
- Llangarron, Herefordshire
- Llangrove, Herefordshire
- Llanrothal, Herefordshire
- Llanveynoe, Herefordshire
- Llanwarne, Herefordshire
- Llanymynech (part), Shropshire
- Llanyblodwel, Shropshire

Furthermore, some Welsh exonyms for English settlements contain the element llan, these include:

- Llancrug (Kenderchurch), Herefordshire
- Llanllieni (Leominster), Herefordshire
- Llantiuoi (Foy), Herefordshire

=== Uncertain of origin ===
- Llanbethery
- Llancadle
- Llancarfan
- Llanhamlach
- Llandawke
- Llandeloy
- Llandefalle
- Llandevaud
- Llanddowror
- Llanfrechfa
- Llanybri
- Llanycrwys
- Llanwenarth
- Llandevenny, Newport

== Place names in Cornwall ==
=== Places named after saints ===
- Lannahevran, St Keverne, Saint Achevran
- Lannaled, St Germans, Saint Aled
- Lannanta or Ewni Lananta, Lelant, Saint Anta
- Lannbrobus, Probus, Saint Probus
- Lanndege, Old Kea, Saint Kea
- Lanndewydnek, Landewednack, Saint Gwynnek
- Lanndhylyk, Landulph, Saint Deloc
- Lanndoho, St Kew near Wadebridge, Saint Dochou, similar to the Welsh Llandochau
- Lannentenin, St Anthony in Meneage, Saint Antonius
- Lannewa, St Ewe, Saint Ewa
- Lannfyek, Feock, Saint Feoc
- Lanngostentin, Constantine, Saint Constantine
- Lannhernow, Lanherne, Saint Hernow
- Lanngenewyt, Langunnett, Saint Cyneuit
- Lanngorrek or Lanngorrow, Crantock, Saint Goroc
- Lannhydrek, Lanhydrock, Saint Hydrek
- Lannjowan, Leyowne, Saint John
- Lannkynhorn or Lanngenhorn, Linkinhorne, Saint Cynhoern
- Lannlivri, Lanlivery, Saint Lyfri
- Lannmoren or Lannvorenn, Lamorran, Saint Morenna or Saint Moren
- Lannoweyn, Cubert, Saint Owein
- Lannreydhek or Lannreydhow, Lanreath, Saint Reydhek or Saint Reydhow
- Lannrigon, Laregan and Lariggan
- Lannrihorn, Ruan Lanihorne, Saint Rihoern
- Lannsalwys, Lansallos, Saint Salwys
- Lannseles, Launcells, Saint Seles
- Lannsiek, St Just in Roseland, Saint Siek
- Lannstevan, Launceston, Saint Stephen
- Lannsulyan, Luxulyan, Saint Sulyan
- Lannudhno, St Erth, Saint Udhno
- Lannunwal, Laninval
- Lannust, St Just in Penwith, Saint Just
- Lannvihal, St Michael Caerhays, Saint Michael
- Lannvorek, Mevagissey, Saint Morec
- Lannvowsedh, St Mawes, Saint Maudet
- Lannwedhenek, Padstow, Saint Guethenoc
- Lannwenek, Lewannick, Saint Gwenek
- Lannwolesyk, Lellizzick, Saint Gwledic
- Lannworon, Goran, Saint Goron
- Lannystli, Gulval, Saint Ystli

=== Place names with religious connections other than a saint ===
- Kellilann, Clann, enclosure grove
- Lannderow, Landeryou, oak tree enclosure/grove
- Lannbesow, Lambessow, birch tree enclosure/grove
- Lannbron, Lambourne, hill enclosure
- Lanndreth, St Blazey, religious enclosure by a beach or ferry
- Lanneves, Lanivet, sacred grove religious enclosure
- Lanneyst, Laneast, unknown
- Lanngordhow, Fowey, religious enclosure of tribes
- Lannmanagh, Lammana, monk's enclosure
- Lannmanagh, Looe Island, monk's enclosure
- Lannpenn, Lampen, head enclosure
- Lannsans, Lezant, holy religious enclosure
- Lannvab, Mabe, son's enclosure
- Lannvyhan or Ladnvian, Laddenvean, small religious enclosure
- Lannwydhek, Mylor, wooded religious enclosure
- Seghlan, Sellan, dry enclosure

=== Place names without a religious connection ===
- Landrevik, Landrivick, originally Hendrevik (little old farm)
- Landu, Landue, originally Nansdu (black or dark valley)
- Landu, Lanjew (Withiel), originally Lendu (black or dark strip field)
- Landuwy, Lantewey, originally Nantduwey (valley of the river Dewey)
- Lannestek, Lanescot, originally Lysnestek (Nestoc's court)
- Langarth, Langarth, originally Lenangath (the cat's strip field)
- Langover, Langore, originally Nansgover (stream valley)
- Lanjergh, Lanjeth, originally Nansyergh (roebucks valley)
- Lanjiogh, Lanjew (Kea), originally Nanskiogh (stream valley)
- Lankarrow, Lancarrow, originally Nanskarrow (stag's valley)
- Lanlegh, Lanteague, originally Nanslegh (rock slab valley)
- Lanlowarn, Lanlawren, originally Nanslowarn (fox's valley)
- Lanmelin, Lamellion, originally Nansmelin (mill valley)
- Lanmelin, Lamellyn, originally Nansmelin (mill valley)
- Lanmorek, Lamorick, originally Nansmorek (Moroc's valley)
- Lanmornow, Lamorna, originally Nansmornow (valley of a stream called Morno)
- Lannergh, Lanarth, woodland clearing
- Lannergh, Landrake, woodland clearing
- Lannergh, Lannarth, woodland clearing
- Lannergh, Lanner, woodland clearing
- Lannergh, Larrick, woodland clearing
- Lannergh, Larrick (South Petherwin), woodland clearing
- Lannergh, Muchlarnick, woodland clearing
- Lansewigy, Lanseague, originally Nansewigy (hinds valley)
- Lanteglos, Lanteglos-by-Camelford, originally Nanteglos (church valley)
- Lanteglos, Lanteglos-by-Fowey, originally Nanteglos (church valley)
- Lantlogh, Landlooe, originally Nantlogh (valley of the river Looe)
- Lantollek, Lantallack, originally Nanstollek (hollowed valley)
- Lantyvet, Lantivet, originally Nantyvet (cultivated valley)
- Lantyeyn, Lantyan, originally Nantyeyn (cold valley)
- Lanyeyn, Lanyon, originally Lynyeyn (cold pool)
- Lanyeyn, Lanyon (Gwinear), named after the Lanyon family from Lynyeyn (cold pool)

=== Place names in areas bordering Cornwall ===
- Landkey (near Barnstaple, Devon), Saint Kea

== Place names in Brittany ==
- Lampaul-Guimiliau (Breton: Lambaol-Gwimilio), Saint Paul
- Landerneau (Breton: Landerne), Saint Ténénan
- Langolen (Breton: Langolen), Saint Collen
- Landeleau (Breton: Landelo), Saint Teilo
- Landoac (Breton: Landoac), Saint Doac
- Lanildut (Breton: Lannildud), Saint Illtud
- Lannédern (Breton: Lannedern), Saint Edern
- Landévennec (Breton: Landevenneg), Winwaloe
- Landivisiau (Breton: Landivizio), Saint Gwisiau
- Landudal (Breton: Landudal), Tudwal
- Lanhouarneau (Breton: Lanhouarne), Saint Hervé
- Landévant (Breton: Landevant), Saint Tevant
- Landudec (Breton: Landudeg), Saint Tadec
- Landunvez (Breton: Landunvez), Sainte Tunvez
- Langoëlan (Breton: Lanwelan), Saint Gouelan
- Languidic (Breton: Langedig), Saint Cynedd
- Landéda (Breton: Landeda), Saint Tédia or Saint Tydeu
- Landujan (Breton: Landujan), Saint Tudin (Tudwal)
- Langast (Breton: Lanwal), Saint Gal
- Langourla (Breton: Langourlae), Saint Gourlae
- Langrolay-sur-Rance (Breton: Langorlae), Saint Gourlae
- Languenan (Breton: Langenan), Saint Kenan
- Langonnet (Breton: Langoned), Saint Konoed (Saint Cynwyd)
- Lanmodez (Breton: Lanvaodez), Saint Maudez
- Landrévarzec (Breton: Landrevarzeg), Saint Harzheg
- Lanarvily (Breton: Lannarvili), Saint Haeruili
- Lanvénégen (Breton: Lannejenn), Saint Menegean
- Lanvollon (Breton: Lannolon), Saint Volon
- Landaul (Breton: Landaol), (Perhaps Saint Teilo)
- Landébia (Breton: Landebiav), Saint Tebiav
- Lannéanou (Breton: Lanneanoù), Saint Leanou
- La Harmoye (Breton: Lanhervoed), Saint Harmoël
- La Landec (Breton: Lannandeg), Saint Deg
- Landéhen (Breton: Landehen), Saint Guéhen
- La Méaugon (Breton: Lanvealgon), Saint Algon
- Lancieux (Breton: Lanseeg), Saint Séoc (or Sieu)
- Langueux (Breton: Langaeg), Saint Guéthénoc
- Lanhélin (Breton: Lanhelen), Saint Helen
- Laniscat (Breton: Lanniskad), Saint Escat
- Lanneuffret (Breton: Lanneured), Saint Gwévret
- Saint-Urbain (Breton: Lannurvan), Saint Urvan
- Lannion (Breton: Lannuon)
- Landebaëron (Breton: Landebaeron)
- La Malhoure (Breton: Lanvelor)
- La Nouaye (Breton: Lanwaz)
- Lanrigan (Breton: Lanrigan), Saint Rigan
- Lanrivoaré (Breton: Lanriware), Saint Riware
- La Vraie-Croix (Breton: Langroez)
- Lanfains (Breton: Lanfeun), Lanfains' name comes from the Breton language « lann » (hermitage) and, it seems, from the Latin « fanum » (temple). Lanfains was situated at the border of the Gallo and Breton languages.
- Langan, Ille-et-Vilaine (Breton: Langan)
- Langon (Breton: Landegon)
- Languédias (Breton: Langadiarn), Saint Catihern
- Lanmérin (Breton: Lanvilin), Saint Mérin (Sant Vilin in Breton)
- Lannebert (Breton: Lannebeur), Saint Eber
- Lanvellec (Breton: Lanvaeleg), Saint Maeleg
- Lanvéoc (Breton: Lañveog), Saint Maeoc
- Laurenan (Breton: Lanreunan), Saint Ronan*

== Place names in Cumbria ==
The Cumbric language was spoken in Cumbria and elsewhere in The Old North up until the Early Middle Ages and some place names in Cumbria and surrounding counties have a Brythonic origin.

- Ketland. The first element is possibly equivalent to Welsh coed, "forest, wood".
- Lambert Ladd. Compare Lampert below.
- Lamplugh. The second element '-plugh' has been explained as equivalent to Welsh plwyf "parish", or blwch "bare".

The historic name Llan Lleenawc may have been in this region and named after either Laenauc, a father of Guallauc, or *Lennóc, a saint name.

=== Place-names in areas bordering Cumbria ===
- Lampert, Northumberland, also spelt Lampart. The second element has been explained as an equivalent of Welsh perth, "hedge, thicket".

In addition, *landā-, the earlier Brittonic word ancestral to llan occurs in Vindolanda, the name of a Roman fort.

== Place names in Scotland ==
Some place names in Scotland have Pictish and Cumbric elements such as aber- and lhan- (also spelled lum-, lon- and lin-) that are cognate with those in other Brittonic languages. The Gaelic form lann ("enclosure, churchyard") also occurs, and its existence in Pictland may represent adoption into Gaelic of the Pictish usage.

=== Places named after saints ===
- Lhanbryde, Moray (Gaelic: Lann Brìghde). Saint Bride. Lamanbride in 1215; the modern Welsh-like spelling is probably a 19th-century innovation)
- Lumphanan, Aberdeenshire (Gaelic: Lann Fhìonain), Saint Fhìonain.
- Lumphinnans Fife. Its etymology is identical to Lumphinnans above, with which it shares a Gaelic name.

=== Places with other religious connections ===
- Landis, Kirkcudbrightshire. Uncertain; may be of Scots origin.
- Lincluden, Kirkcudbrightshire. The location of an abbey. The second part of the name refers to the nearby Cluden Water. The first part could also be lïnn, "pool".
- Lindores, Fife (Gaelic: Lann Doras). An abbey is located here. The name may mean "church at the pass".
- Longannet, Fife (Gaelic: Lann na H-Annaide). Occupied by a now-decommissioned power station. The name probably meant "former church enclosure".

=== Places with no known religious connections ===
- Conland, Fife. Possibly meaning "dog-enclosure" (G conlann, W cwnllan) or "grouping of enclosures" (G cu-lann).
- Drumdratland, Fife. Exact etymology unclear, but the first element is likely druim, "a ridge".
- Falkland, Fife. The first element in the name is unclear.
- Lumquhat, Fife. The name may mean "enclosure of the wild-cats".
- Lynchat, Inverness-shire. Meaning "wildcat's enclosure".
- Pentland, Midlothian. The first element may be pen ("head", "top") or pant ("hollow").
- Pouterlampert, near Castleton, Scottish Borders. The -lampert part of the name may share an etymology with the aforementioned Lampart in Northumberland. The first part of the name is *polter, an obscure Brittonic suffix.

== In fiction ==
- The long running American soap opera One Life to Live is set in fictional Llanview, Pennsylvania, set just outside the city of Philadelphia. In the fictional universe of the soap, Llanview is the county seat for Llantano County. An important historical estate, Llanfair, is also set in Llanview.
- Llanwelly is the fictional Welsh village that serves as the setting for The Wolfman, 1941, written by Curt Siodmak. Llanwelly is also featured in the first section of Frankenstein Meets the Wolfman.

== See also ==
- Welsh placenames
- List of Celtic place names in Galicia
