= St Llibio's Church, Llanllibio =

Demolished church in Anglesey, Wales

Coordinates: 53.305590°N 4.508232°W

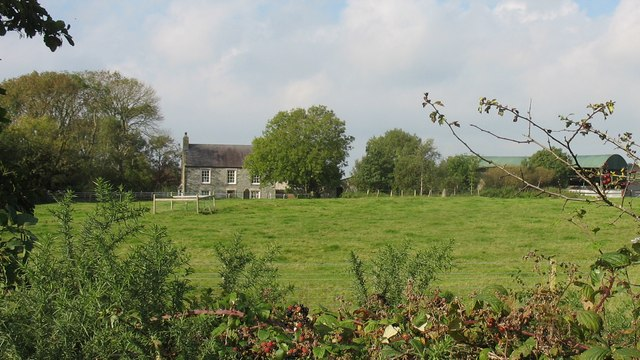
- Site of the former church

- Location in Anglesey
- Location: near Bodedern, Anglesey
- Country: Wales
- Previous denomination: Church of England

History
- Status: Chapel of ease
- Founded: 6th century
- Founder: Llibio
- Dedication: Llibio

Architecture
- Functional status: Demolished
- Closed: 17th century

St Llibio's Church, Llanllibio is a demolished church in Anglesey, north Wales. Founded by Llibio in the sixth century, the church served a small community of bondmen as a chapel of ease. The population of Llanllibio declined substantially during the Middle Ages as a result of the Black Death and changes in farming practice, amongst other factors, and the community that the church served effectively disappeared. As a result, St Llibio's closed in the seventeenth century; the remaining worshippers moved to another local church.

Plans in the nineteenth century to rebuild the church, which was in ruins by 1776, came to nothing. Except for a memorial stone, nothing more than "tiny traces" of St Llibio's can now be seen.

== Early history ==
St Llibio's was the church for Llanllibio in Anglesey, north Wales. A survey of Anglesey conducted in 1352 records Llanllibio as a tir cyfrif township, a Welsh form of land tenure in which the inhabitants, who were generally few in number, were bondmen working for the lord in return for a small arable holding and some grazing rights. It was the only tir cyfrif township in Anglesey to have a church. Like many other communities in Anglesey, and elsewhere in medieval Wales, Llanllibio's population decreased substantially during the Middle Ages, and the settlement effectively disappeared. Communities such as Llanllibio were affected by the Black Death, the destruction resulting from the revolt of Owen Glyndwr, by changes in land tenure, and by new farming practices that reduced the need for tied labour.

The parish was on the old road between London and the Anglesey port town of Holyhead, and about 0.8 miles (1.3 km) from Bodedern. The church was dedicated to St Llibio, a sixth-century monk, confessor, and disciple of the Anglesey saint Cybi. Llibio himself is recorded as having founded a church on the site, and his feast day was celebrated on 28 February. The area took its name from the church: the Welsh word "llan" originally meant "enclosure" and then "church".

St Llibio's was used as a chapel of ease to the Church of St Afran, St Ieuan and St Sannan, Llantrisant, about 1.5 miles (2.4 km) away.

== Closure ==
St Llibio's was closed in the seventeenth century, and the church at Llantrisant was enlarged to accommodate worshippers from Llanllibio. By 1776 St Llibio's was in ruins. According to Angharad Llwyd, a historian of Anglesey writing in 1833, the inhabitants of the area attended worship at St Edern's Church, Bodedern. She noted that Wynne Jones, the rector of Llantrisant, hoped to rebuild the church, but that did not happen.

A survey in 1937 by the Royal Commission on Ancient and Historical Monuments in Wales and Monmouthshire stated that "the church has entirely disappeared, but the foundations of the churchyard wall are still visible." A 2006 guide to the churches of Anglesey says that "only tiny traces" of the church can be seen, adding that a memorial slate marks its location.
