= Presaddfed Burial Chamber =

Neolithic burial chamber in Anglesey, Wales

Coordinates: 53.2992°N 4.4809°W

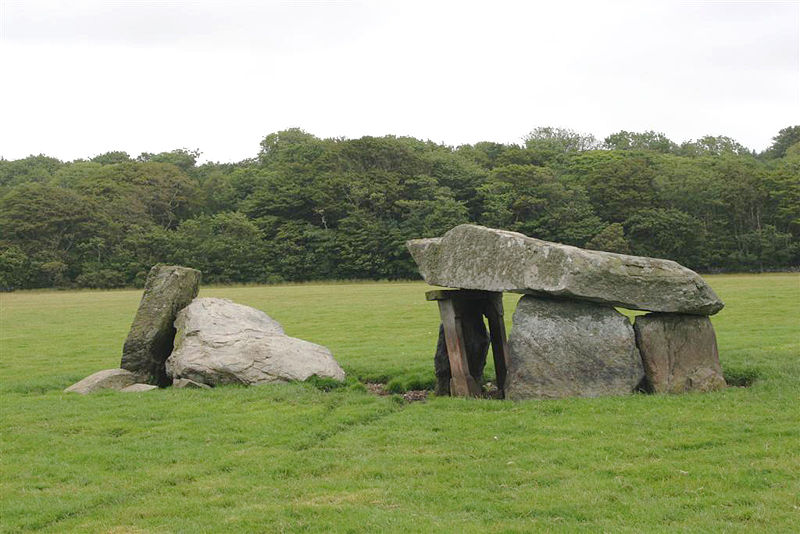
Presaddfed Burial Chamber

The site of Presaddfed Burial Chamber, in Bodedern Community, on the northwest side of Anglesey, Wales.

Presaddfed Burial Chamber is a scheduled ancient monument a short distance northwest of Bodedern in Anglesey, north Wales, comprising two Neolithic chamber tombs. It is maintained by Cadw.

== Tombs ==
There are two neolithic tombs at this site, which is located about 100 m (330 ft) south of Llyn Llywenan and about 1 km (0.6 mi) northwest of the village of Bodedern. The southern tomb is the more complete; it has a capstone some 4 by 3 m (13 by 10 ft), supported by three stout upright stones at the south end and by a single more slender stone at the north. Additionally there is a wooden frame beside the north upright that may provide some additional support. The northern tomb is considerably damaged with two remaining uprights at the north end; the capstone has fallen and is leaning against them. During the eighteenth century, when this site was first recorded, the northern tomb was already in a state of disrepair. It is unclear whether these chambers, which are only a few metres apart, were part of the same structure or were independent. A report in The Archaeological Journal in the mid-nineteenth century states that at that time the chambers were surrounded by a large number of small stones. Nowadays, this stone debris is no longer visible, but its former presence may indicate that at one time, both chambers were buried under a single mound, as is the case in the multi-phase burial tomb at Trefignath, some 9 km (6 mi) west of Presaddfed.

== Investigation and protection ==
Presaddfed was described by Richard Gough in his 1798 version of William Camden's topographical survey Britannia. It was described in numerous nineteenth century articles in Archaeologia Cambrensis, and was included in J.E. Griffiths' 1900 book, 'A Portfolio of Photographs of the Cromlechs of Anglesey and Caernarvonshire'. Early reports suggest quantities of cairn material surrounded the cromlechs, which is no longer evident, so may have been removed in the nineteenth century. There appears not to have been any formal archaeological excavation on the monument. The monument now has legal protection as a Scheduled Monument, and is in the care of the state, managed by Cadw under a Guardianship agreement. The Royal Commission on the Ancient and Historical Monuments of Wales curates the archaeological, architectural and historic records for the site. These include digital photographs, colour and black and white photographs, drawings, NMR site files, and Cadw guardianship records.

About half a mile east of the burial chamber, on the ridge between Tre-Iorwerdd and Presaddfed, there is a tumulus with a circumference of about 55 m (60 yd). It was excavated in 1870 and a jet bead and cremation urns were unearthed.

== Media ==
The HeritageTogether project has used photogrammetry to create 3D models of the site.

== Access ==
The site is open to the public, free of charge, throughout the year, save for 24, 25, 26 December and 1 January. Access is through a kissing gate and across a grassy field, a distance of about 200 m (700 ft), and there is a pull-in by the roadside which is large enough for two cars.
