= St Mihangel's Church, Llanfihangel yn Nhowyn =

Church in Anglesey, Wales

Coordinates: 53.267408°N 4.518293°W

St Mihangel's Church
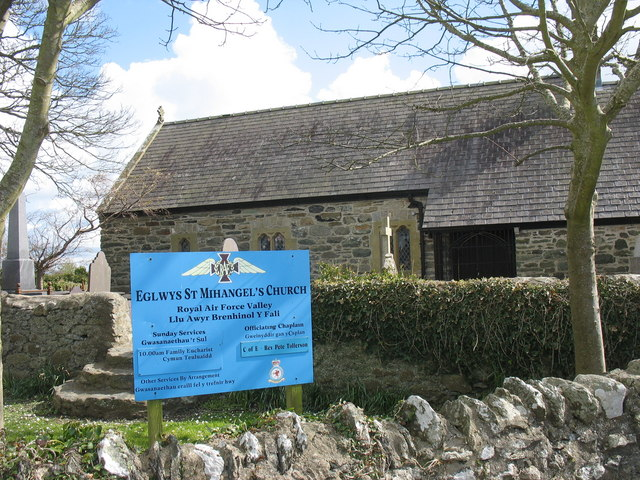
- St Mihangel's Church

- Location in Anglesey
- OS grid reference: SH 321 774
- Location: Llanfihangel yn Nhowyn, Anglesey
- Country: Wales
- Previous denomination: Church in Wales

History
- Status: Chapel for RAF Valley
- Dedication: St Michael

Architecture
- Functional status: Active
- Heritage designation: Grade II
- Designated: 5 April 1971
- Architect: Henry Kennedy (1862)
- Architectural type: Church

Specifications
- Materials: Rubble masonry

St Mihangel's Church in the village of Llanfihangel yn Nhowyn is a former parish church now used as the chapel for RAF Valley in Anglesey, north Wales. The date of the first church on the site is uncertain, but in 1862 the then-existing church was rebuilt. St Mihangel's became the chapel for the nearby Royal Air Force base in 1998, after the Church in Wales had ceased using it for services. It was then extended by dismantling and reassembling another Anglesey church, St Enghenedl's, at the west end of the building.

The church is a Grade II listed building, a national designation given to "buildings of special interest, which warrant every effort being made to preserve them", in particular because it is regarded as "a good example of a mid 19th-century church". The church contains some stained-glass windows commemorating the work carried out at RAF Valley, including the RAF Search and Rescue units based there.

== History and location ==
St Mihangel's Church is set within a gated and walled churchyard at the side of the road in the village of Llanfihangel yn Nhowyn in Anglesey, north Wales. It is dedicated to St Michael (Welsh: Mihangel). The village, which is about 5 miles (8.0 km) from the port town of Holyhead in the north-west of the island, takes its name from the church; the Welsh word llan originally meant "enclosure" and then "church", and "‑fihangel" is a modified form of the saint's name.

The date of the first church on this site is unknown; writing in 1833, the antiquarian Angharad Llwyd described the church then on the site as "an ancient and venerable structure" that formed "a conspicuous and interesting object for many miles round." St Mihangel's was largely rebuilt in 1862 by Henry Kennedy, architect of the Diocese of Bangor; some of the earlier building, especially the east end, was reused in Kennedy's church. St Enghenedl's Church, Llanynghenedl (a disused Anglesey church) was dismantled and "faithfully reassembled" at the west end of St Mihangel's in 1988, to allow the building to serve as the chapel for RAF Valley, a nearby Royal Air Force base. The orientation of St Enghenedl's was reversed in the process; its former west end was joined to the west end of Kennedy's building, therefore St Enghenedl's east end now faces west. The work was carried out by D of E Property Services Agency.

== Architecture and fittings ==
Writing in 1847, before Kennedy's rebuilding, the clergyman and antiquarian Harry Longueville Jones described the church as small (46 feet (14 m) long, 21 feet 6 inches (6.55 m) wide and 9 feet (2.7 m) high) and of early Perpendicular character. He said that the east window had a "peculiar" design, in that there was a shield-shaped section of window above and between the two main sections, perhaps designed to display a coat of arms.

The present building is rectangular, using rubble masonry dressed with freestone; the roof uses slates and stone copings. The 19th-century part of the church is wider and higher than the 1988 extension. The bellcote is in the middle of the roof, at the join between the two sections. There is an annexe including a vestry at the western end of the north side of the extension. The nave has three bays and the roof timbers are exposed. The sanctuary is marked off by a step and a rail, and there is a 17th-century gravestone set into the floor in front of the sanctuary. The extension has two bays, and the two parts are divided by an arcade of three round arches. The church and annexe have separate entrances.

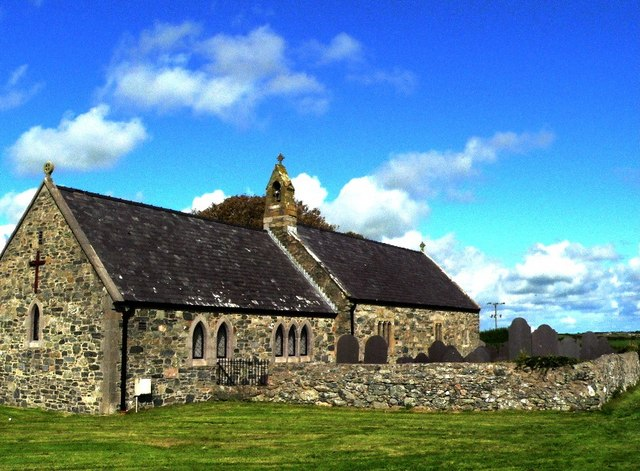
St Mihangel's, extended in 1988 by re-erecting St Enghenedl's Church, Llanynghenedl, at the west end (the left in this picture)

The windows in the 19th-century part are topped with trefoils (a stonework pattern of three overlapping circles) and set into square frames. The north wall has three windows, one with a single light (or section) and two with pairs of lights; there are two windows on the south wall (one with three lights, another with two) as well as a blocked window at the east end of the wall. The church's east window is a pointed arch with a lower section of three trefoil-headed lights and two smaller lights on top. The windows in the extension are set into pointed arches.

Most of the windows contain clear leaded glass, but some have stained glass. In 2010, a two-panel stained glass window depicting the work of the RAF Search and Rescue units at RAF Valley was dedicated by the RAF's Chaplain-in-Chief, Ray Pentland. The window, which also commemorates the work of the Royal National Lifeboat Institution and the RAF Mountain Rescue Service, was created by Karen Newby – wife of a former RAF Valley station commander – and Lindsey Abbott. Karen Newby also designed a window dedicated in 2001 to mark the work of 208 Squadron at RAF Valley. Another stained glass window was added in 2012 to mark the 100th anniversary of 4 Squadron.

A 1937 survey by the Royal Commission on Ancient and Historical Monuments in Wales and Monmouthshire noted a rectangular font made of gritstone, of unknown date, and a memorial to a Sion Evan and his son Evan Jones, who died in 1790 and 1822 respectively. A survey of church plate within the Bangor diocese in 1906 recorded a chalice and paten made of Britannia metal (a pewter alloy), and an electro-plated set of communion vessels. It noted that the old silver communion service had been stolen.

== Assessment ==
St Mihangel's has national recognition and statutory protection from unauthorised alteration as it has been designated a Grade II listed building – the lowest of the three grades of listing, designating "buildings of special interest, which warrant every effort being made to preserve them". It was given this status on 5 April 1971, and has been listed because it is regarded as "a good example of a mid 19th-century church, built as part of a programme of reconstruction and restoration of Anglesey churches". Cadw (the Welsh Government body responsible for the built heritage of Wales and the inclusion of Welsh buildings on the statutory lists) also notes "the simplicity of its design, complementing the local late medieval idiom typical of the island."
