= Rhosydd =

Village in Anglesey, Wales

Coordinates: 53.281583°N 4.511890°W

- Location within Anglesey
- OS grid reference: SH 3263 7901
  - Cardiff: 136.6 mi (219.8 km)
  - London: 221.7 mi (356.8 km)
- Community: Bodedern
- Principal area: Anglesey
- Country: Wales
- Sovereign state: United Kingdom
- Post town: Caergybi
- Police: North Wales
- Fire: North Wales
- Ambulance: Welsh
- UK Parliament: Ynys Môn
- Senedd Cymru – Welsh Parliament: Bangor Conwy Môn

Rhosydd is a village in the community of Bodedern, Anglesey, Wales, which is 136.6 miles (219.8 km) from Cardiff and 221.7 miles (356.8 km) from London.

== See also ==
- List of localities in Wales by population
