= Henry Kennedy (architect) =

British architect

Henry Kennedy (bapt. 6 February 1814 – 1896) was a British architect.

He was born the son of John and Anne Kennedy in Hammersmith, London. In the early 1840s, after training as an architect, he moved to live in Bangor, North Wales.

About 1858 he entered into partnership with a Bristol-born architect, John Mechelen Rogers (c.1831–1889), who afterwards moved to London. The partnership ended about 1866 and Kennedy then entered into a new one with Gustavus O’Donoghue of Glasgow, also of London, which ended in 1871. After that Kennedy worked alone until shortly before his death.

Most of his work was for the Diocese of Bangor, where he dominated church architecture for over fifty years, leaving his mark on most of the churches in the area. During his career he had been involved in some 80 applications to the Incorporated Church Building Society for grants to carry out work in the Bangor diocese. His two partners played little part in his Welsh projects.

Henry Kennedy died in 1896. He had married Emily Du Pre, the third daughter of Rev Thomas Du Pre, Rector of Willoughby, Lincolnshire. They had two children, Emily and Henry Du Pre Kennedy.

== Selected works ==
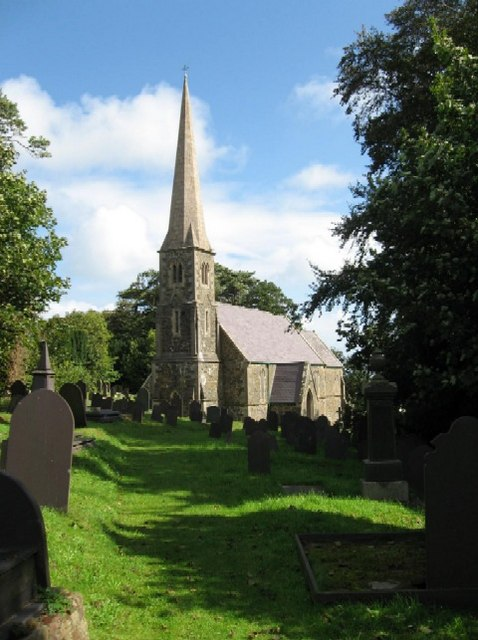
St Gwenllwyfo's church, Llanwenllwyfo

- Gwrych Castle extension (~1840s)
- Llan Ffestiniog church (1843)
- St Mary's Church, Llanfair Mathafarn Eithaf (1847)
- St Peris's Church, Nant Peris (1848)
- St Cristiolus's Church, Llangristiolus (1852)
- St Edwen's Church, Llanedwen (1856)
- St Gwenllwyfo's Church, Llanwenllwyfo (1856)
- St Mary's Church, Llanfair-yn-Neubwll (1857)
- St Ceinwen's Church, Cerrigceinwen (1860)
- St Mihangel's Church, Llanfihangel yn Nhowyn (1862)
- St Enghenedl's Church, Llanynghenedl (1862)
- St James Church, Bangor (1864)
- St Cynfarwy's Church, Llechgynfarwy (1867)
- St Mary's Church, Bodewryd (1867)
- St Beuno's Church, Aberffraw (1868)
- St Catherine's Parish Church, Criccieth (1869)
- St Edern's Church, Bodedern (1871)
- St Deiniol's Church, Llanddaniel Fab (1873)
- St Mary's Church, Pentraeth (1882)
- St Gallgo's Church, Llanallgo (1892)
