= St Cynfarwy's Church, Llechgynfarwy =

Church in Anglesey, Wales

St Cynfarwy's Church
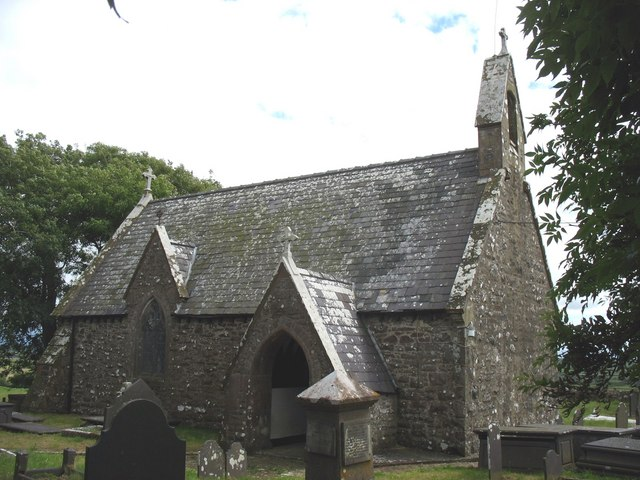
- The church seen from the north-west

- Location in Anglesey
- 53°18′07″N 4°25′51″W
- Location: Llechgynfarwy, Anglesey
- Country: Wales
- Denomination: Church in Wales

History
- Status: Parish church
- Founded: c. 630
- Founder: St Cynfarwy
- Dedication: St Cynfarwy

Architecture
- Functional status: Active
- Heritage designation: Grade II
- Designated: 12 May 1970
- Architect(s): Kennedy & O'Donoghue (1867 rebuilding)
- Architectural type: Church
- Style: Early Decorated

Specifications
- Length: 40 ft (12 m)
- Width: 16 ft (4.9 m)
- Materials: Rubble masonry, slate roof

Administration
- Province: Province of Wales
- Diocese: Diocese of Bangor
- Archdeaconry: Bangor
- Deanery: Llifon and Talybolion
- Parish: Bodedern with Llanfaethlu

Clergy
- Vicar: Vacant since September 2009

St Cynfarwy's Church is a medieval parish church in Llechgynfarwy, Anglesey, north Wales. The first church in the vicinity was established by St Cynfarwy (a 7th-century saint about whom little is known) in about 630, but no structure from that time survives. The present building contains a 12th-century baptismal font, indicating the presence of a church at that time, although extensive rebuilding in 1867 removed the datable features of the previous edifice.

It is a Grade II listed building, a national designation given to "buildings of special interest, which warrant every effort being made to preserve them", in particular because it is "a simple, rural church of Medieval origins". The church is still used for worship by the Church in Wales, one of nine in a combined parish, although there has not been an incumbent priest since September 2009.

== History and location ==
St Cynfarwy's Church is set within a churchyard at the side of the road in the centre of Llechgynfarwy, a hamlet in Anglesey, north Wales. The settlement is in the countryside about 6 miles (10 km) to the north-west of Llangefni, the county town, and about 10 miles (16 km) from the port of Holyhead.

According to the 19th-century Anglesey historian Angharad Llwyd, the first church was established here by St Cynfarwy in about 630. The date of the present structure is uncertain, although one 19th-century historian suggested that it might be from the 15th century. There was a church here before the 15th century, however, since the font is from the 12th century and a church was recorded in this location in the Norwich Taxation of 1254. On 5 November 1349, the possessions of the deceased clergyman who had been the incumbent priest of Llechgynfarwy were dealt with by an inquisition at Beaumaris, Anglesey – one of several dead clergymen whose goods were considered that day. According to the historian Antony Carr, the timing suggests that the priests had been victims of the Black Death, and he notes that "the clergy as a class were hit particularly hard" by it.

A chapel was added on the south side of the building in 1664. St Cynfarwy's was largely reconstructed in 1867 under Henry Kennedy, the architect of the Diocese of Bangor. Kennedy's work, which rebuilt the church "almost from the foundations" in the words of a 2009 guide to the buildings of the region, left no datable features. When Llwyd described the church in 1833, she called it a "spacious and handsome cruciform edifice", with transepts on the north and south sides; there is nothing on the north side of the present building apart from the porch in the north-west corner, added by Kennedy in 1867.

St Cynfarwy's is still used for worship by the Church in Wales, and is one of nine churches in the combined benefice of Bodedern with Llanfaethlu. As of 2012, the nine churches do not have an incumbent priest, and the position has been vacant since September 2009. The church is within the deanery of Llifon and Talybolion, the archdeaconry of Bangor and the Diocese of Bangor.

People associated with the church include Owen Humphrey Davies, a 19th-century composer, conductor and quarry worker, who became a clergyman in his late forties. He was rector of the church from 1895 until his death in 1898.

== Architecture and fittings ==
St Cynfarwy's is built in Early Decorated style using rubble masonry dressed with freestone. The roof is made from slate and has a stone bellcote decorated with Tudor roses at the west end.

The arched inner door of the porch (which was added by Kennedy in 1867), with its "ornate hinges", leads into the north-west corner of the nave. Inside, the 19th-century roof with its exposed woodwork can be seen above the nave and chancel, which together measure 40 feet 3 inches by 16 ft 9 inches (12.3 by 5.1 m). There is no structural division between them, apart from two steps that lead up into the chancel. The 17th-century chapel is on the south side of the church, and the wooden trusses of its roof can also be seen. There are external buttresses to support the structure at the north-east corner and alongside the porch.

The north wall of the church has a window of two lights (sections of window separated by mullions; the Perpendicular-style window in the south wall has three lights topped with trefoils (a pattern of three overlapping circles) set in a rectangular frame. The south wall of the chapel has a two-light window in an arch. Above it, there is a stone with the date "1664" and the initials "W B". These are the initials of William Bold, a member of the family owning an estate and house about 1 mile (2 km) from the church. The east window has two lights with three trefoils in the decorative stone tracery at the top, set in an arched frame with a hoodmould on the outer wall. Geometric patterns of stained glass, dating from about 1860, decorate the east window. A survey in 1937 by the Royal Commission on Ancient and Historical Monuments in Wales and Monmouthshire also noted a brass plate by the north nave window commemorating the 18th-century bequest of a Catherine Roberts to "two old housekeepers of unblemished character".

The 12th-century stone font, which is 18 inches (46 cm) in diameter and 13 inches (33 cm) high, has a small circular bowl decorated with four panels carved with saltire crosses; a fifth panel is plain. It is set on a 19th-century base at the west end of the church. Monuments include one in the south chapel to Helen Bold (died 1631), the mother of William Bold. It has a large inscribed brass plate set in marble showing the genealogical links between the Bold family and the Tudor dynasty. There are two 18th-century memorials on the north wall of the nave, less elaborate than the Bold memorial.

A survey of church plate within the Bangor diocese in 1906 said that the church's chalice, dated 1632, was "an interesting and very rare example" from the time of King Charles I (reigned 1625–1649), and had "a mixture of characteristics of different periods." It has a hexagonal stem engraved in medieval style, with a base depicting the Crucifixion and a more modern "engraved feather-like decoration". The inscription and coat of arms record that it was donated by William Bold. It measures just under 8 inches (20 cm) high and is about 3.25 inches (8 cm) in diameter. The survey also noted a 19th-century silver eight-sided paten, decorated with similar engravings to the chalice.

== Assessment ==
St Cynfarwy's has national recognition and statutory protection from alteration as it has been designated as a Grade II listed building – the lowest of the three grades of listing, designating "buildings of special interest, which warrant every effort being made to preserve them". It was given this status on 12 May 1970, and has been listed because it is regarded as "a simple, rural church of Medieval origin." Cadw (the Welsh Government body responsible for the built heritage of Wales and the inclusion of Welsh buildings on the statutory lists) also notes that although the church retains some medieval fabric and has some features that date from the 17th century, it "is largely of 19th-century character", calling it "a simple vernacular building".
