= St Edwen's Church, Llanedwen =

Coordinates: 53.190578°N 4.220076°W

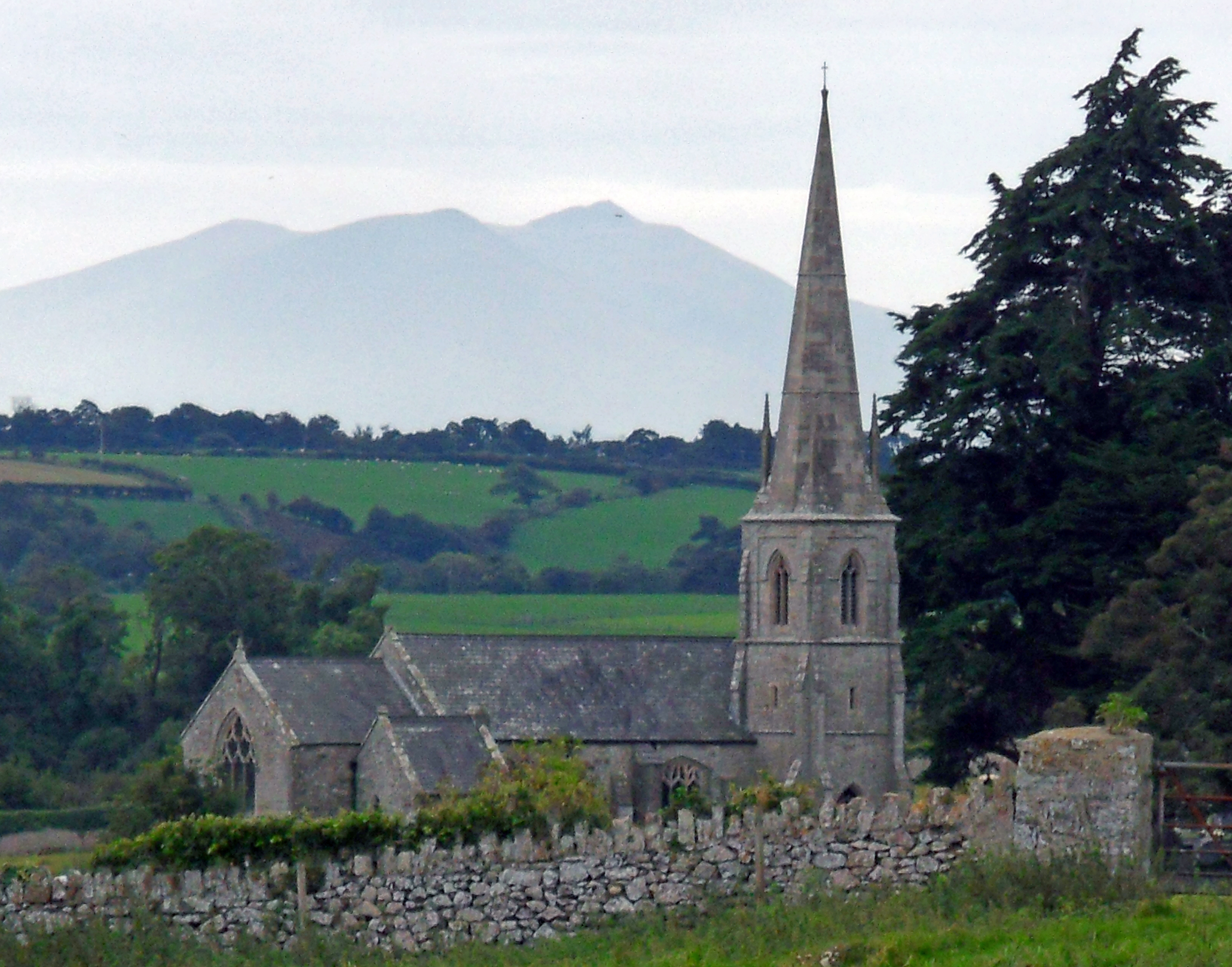
- The north side of St Edwen's

- Location in Anglesey
- Location: Llanedwen, Anglesey
- Country: Wales
- Denomination: Church in Wales
- Website: Parish website

History
- Status: Parish church
- Founded: 640; current building 1856
- Founder: St Edwen
- Dedication: St Edwen

Architecture
- Functional status: Active
- Heritage designation: Grade II
- Designated: 23 April 1998
- Architect: Henry Kennedy
- Architectural type: Church
- Style: Late Decorated

Specifications
- Materials: Rubble masonry with red gritstone

Administration
- Province: Province of Wales
- Diocese: Diocese of Bangor
- Archdeaconry: Bangor
- Deanery: Synod Ynys Mon
- Parish: Bro Dwynwen

St Edwen's Church, Llanedwen, is a 19th-century parish church near the Menai Strait, in Anglesey, north Wales. The first church was founded here by St. Edwen (daughter of Edwin of Northumbria, king and saint) in 640, but the present structure dates from 1856 and was designed by Henry Kennedy, the architect of the Diocese of Bangor. It contains some memorials from the 17th and 18th centuries and a reading desk that reuses panel work from the 14th and 17th centuries. The 18th-century historian Henry Rowlands was vicar here, and is buried in the churchyard. The church is on land that forms part of the Plas Newydd estate, home of the family of the Marquess of Anglesey since 1812 and owned by the National Trust. Some of the Marquesses of Anglesey, and some of their employees, are also buried in the churchyard.

The church is used for worship by the Church in Wales, one of seven in a combined parish. A service is held using the Book of Common Prayer each Sunday morning. St Edwen's is one of the few churches in regular use in Wales to be lit entirely by candles. It is a Grade II listed building, a national designation given to "buildings of special interest, which warrant every effort being made to preserve them", in particular because it is regarded as "a good example of H Kennedy's designs for a small-scale rural church."

== History and location ==
St Edwen's Church is in the south of Anglesey, north Wales, in a rural area known as Llanedwen. It is about 5 miles (8 km) from the county town of Llangefni, about 1 mile (1.6 km) from the A4080 road between Llanfairpwllgwyngyll and Brynsiencyn and about 250 metres (270 yds) from the Menai Strait that separates Anglesey from the rest of Wales. The church is on land that forms part of the Plas Newydd estate, which has been the home of the family of the Marquess of Anglesey since 1812; some of the former marquesses and their employees are buried in the churchyard. Plas Newydd and its grounds are now owned by the National Trust. The area of Llanedwen takes its name from the church: the Welsh word llan originally meant "enclosure" and then "church".

According to the 19th-century Anglesey historian Angharad Llwyd, the first church in the area was established by St Edwen in 640. Nothing is known of Edwen's life, but according to the manuscript sources, she was the daughter – perhaps the illegitimate daughter – or the niece of Edwin of Northumbria, a king who converted to Christianity in 627 and who was venerated as a saint after his death in 633. The 12th-century writer Geoffrey of Monmouth said that Edwin was born whilst his mother was taking refuge in north Wales with Cadfan ap Iago.

Llwyd described the church in 1833 as "a small but neat edifice, of great antiquity". In 1840, the church was rebuilt by John Welch. Writing in 1847, the clergyman and antiquarian Harry Longueville Jones said that St Edwen's was in the Early Perpendicular style, although its windows had been replaced, and measured 52 by 16 feet (16 by 5 m). The Welsh politician and church historian Sir Stephen Glynne visited in May 1850. He said that it was "a very small church in a lovely situation", which had "a beautiful view over the Menai".

In 1856, the church seen by Llwyd, Jones and Glynne was demolished and the present structure was erected, designed by Henry Kennedy, architect of the Diocese of Bangor. The only part of the old church to survive was some of the stonework at the base of the west wall. Some repair work was carried out in 1956.

St Edwen's, which is used for worship by the Church in Wales, is one of seven churches in the combined benefice (churches grouped together under an incumbent priest) of Bro Dwynwen. (Note: The other six churches in the parish are St Mary, Llanfairpwll; St Ceinwen, Llangeinwen; St Nidan, Llanidan; St Peter, Newborough; St Thomas, Newborough; and St Mary, Llanfair-yn-y-Cwmwd.) A service is held every Sunday morning using the 1662 Book of Common Prayer, either Holy Communion or Morning Prayer; there are no midweek services. The parish is within the deanery of Synod Ynys Mon, the archdeaconry of Bangor and the Diocese of Bangor. As of 2016, the priest in charge is the Reverend E Roberts and the associate priest is Canon Professor Leslie Francis.

People associated with the church include Henry Rowlands, vicar of St Nidan's, Llanidan, and its associated churches (including St Edwen's) in the first part of the 18th century. He wrote a history of Anglesey entitled Mona Antiqua Restaurata, published in 1723. He is buried in the churchyard to the west of the door. His tombstone is inscribed in Latin with the words: "All things are nought save what he gave to needy ones. These have force when arts perish and writings fall to pieces." William Bulkeley Hughes, who lived in the parish and died in 1882, is also buried in the churchyard. He was a Member of Parliament for 40 years. The churchyard contains one Commonwealth war grave, of a First World War officer of the Westmorland and Cumberland Yeomanry.

== Architecture and fittings ==
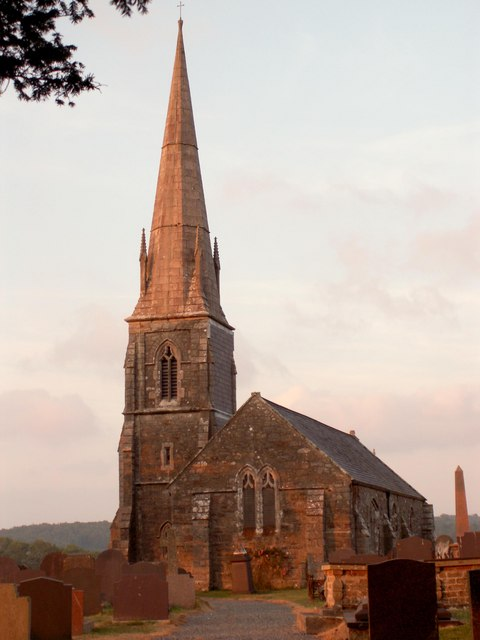
The west end of the church

St Edwen's is built from local red gritstone, formed into square blocks and dressed with sandstone. The roof is made from slate with stone edging. The church, which is in the Late Decorated style, has a tower topped with a broach spire at the north-west corner of the nave, supported by buttresses. The church is entered through a porch with an arched doorway in the lowest of the three stages of the tower. Inside, the woodwork of the roof is exposed; some of the nave timbers might be medieval beams reused in the 1856 rebuilding. The nave and chancel are divided by an arch and by three steps leading up from the nave. The chancel and sanctuary are separated by an altar rail set on top of some wooden panels.

There is a pair of windows in the west wall decorated with tracery (stonework within the window frame forming a pattern). Scenes from the Bible and geometric patterns are shown in the stained glass, and birds (phoenix and peacock) are depicted at the top of the windows. The glass is dedicated to Rice Robert Hughes, a clergyman who died in 1801. There are three arched windows in the south wall of the nave; the stained glass of the easternmost (dedicated to William Bulkeley Hughes) shows biblical scenes. The easternmost window of the three in the north wall of the nave is dedicated to Thomas Bulkeley Hughes (who died in 1836), his wife and children. The chancel has one window in the east wall, which has three lights (sections of window separated by stone mullions).

The pulpit has some 19th-century oak panelling and reuses some ornate 17th-century panel work that is decorated with pictures of cherubs, dragons, dogs and lions' heads. The pews are made of pine; the choir stalls also have some carved oak panels that may date from the 17th century. A reading desk from the 19th century reuses material from the 14th and 17th centuries, depicting a lion, a griffin and angels. The church also has an eight-sided sandstone font decorated with a carved cross.

A survey in 1937 by the Royal Commission on Ancient and Historical Monuments in Wales and Monmouthshire recorded seven 17th and 18th century memorials within the church, the oldest in memory of a Thomas Owen who died in 1646. The tombs in the churchyard include one of a Sidney Griffith (died 1618) and more than 20 others from the 17th and 18th centuries. The survey also noted some oak dog tongs, likely to be from the 19th century, and three 17th-century chairs.

A survey of church plate within the Bangor diocese in 1906 recorded an engraved chalice dated 1842 and a paten dated 1776–77; both are made from silver and are decorated with foliage. A silver flagon bears an inscription to denote that it was given by William Bulkeley Hughes when the new church was consecrated in 1856. The survey also noted a flagon from about 1700 and a dish, both made of pewter, but said that an 18th-century silver chalice had been lost some time after 1811. St Edwen's is one of the few churches in regular use in Wales to be lit only by candles.

== Assessment ==
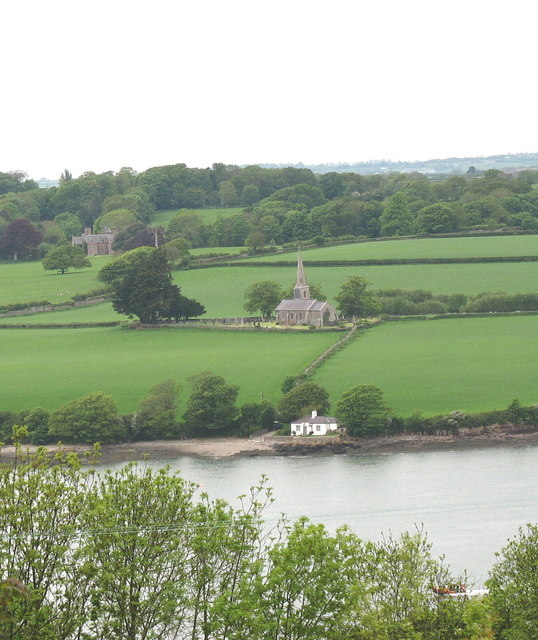
A view of the church from Y Felinheli on the opposite side of the Menai Strait

St Edwen's has national recognition and statutory protection from alteration as it has been designated as a Grade II listed building – the lowest of the three grades of listing, designating "buildings of special interest, which warrant every effort being made to preserve them". It was given this status on 23 April 1998, and has been listed because it is seen as "a good example of H Kennedy's designs for a small-scale rural church". Cadw (the Welsh Government body responsible for the built heritage of Wales and the inclusion of Welsh buildings on the statutory lists) also notes the fittings that incorporate "some fine carved work of the 14th and 17th centuries."

Sabine Baring-Gould, writing in 1908, said that the rebuilt church was "wholly devoid of interest". A 2009 guide to the buildings of the region notes that the Incorporated Church Building Society (active in the 19th century) considered Kennedy's design was "inconsistent with the gravity of feeling which pervades the ancient churches of Wales."

Harry Longueville Jones wrote in 1847 that the churchyard was "one of the most interesting in Anglesey, from its picturesque appearance and situation." A 2006 guide to the churches of Anglesey describes St Edwen's as "a good example of an unspoilt 19th century country church", adding that is "little changed since it was built." It says that it is in a "tranquil spot", and notes that it is a landmark "visible from a considerable distance".
