= Landeryou =

Landeryou is a surname of Cornish origin and is believed to mean "enclosure of oak trees", deriving from a combination of the Cornish elements lann (meaning enclosure, often sacred or agricultural) and derow (plural of derowen, meaning oak tree). The name is rare and historically localized, with a well-documented lineage in Cornwall, especially in the parishes of Constantine and Mylor, near Falmouth.

== Etymology and origins ==
The surname Landeryou appears to originate from a place-name recorded in medieval documents as Landerio, a farmstead in Mylor Parish, Cornwall. This area is located near the tidal inlet known as Mylor Creek. Historical spellings of this place-name include:

Lyndiriomur (1317)

Lyndirriomur (1325)

Lyndirriobighan (1332)

Landeryowe (1512)

Landiryowe (1562)

Lenderyowe (1614)

Landeryou (1623)

The earlier forms, containing suffixes like -mur ("great") and -bighan ("small") suggest that the estate had split into multiple holdings by the early 14th century. The spellings Landiryowe and Landeryou show the transition toward the modern surname and reflect increasing standardization during the 16th and 17th centuries.

Linguistically, the name may have originally incorporated lyn (pool or stream) rather than lann, referencing natural water features near the estate. Over time, however, the interpretation likely shifted toward lann (enclosure, grove) as the surrounding woodland gained agricultural or symbolic significance. The 1839–1843 tithe apportionment for Mylor Parish lists over 31 plots as "Landerio Wood", many marked as hedges, supporting the "enclosure of oak trees" reading.

== Early bearers ==
The earliest known individual to bear the surname in a recognizable form was Cudbert Landiryowe, born in 1562 in Constantine, Cornwall. He died in the same parish on 14 May 1624. Records of his name, especially as Landiryowe, show how spelling conventions were still fluid in the late 16th century. A later record from 1623 already shows the modern spelling Landeryou, indicating that the modern form was in use by the early 17th century.

Cudbert’s association with the Falmouth area and the Landerio estate supports the theory that the surname originated from this specific place-name. The family at the time was primarily involved in sheep farming, a typical occupation in rural Cornwall.

== Emigration and diaspora ==
By the 18th and 19th centuries, members of the Landeryou family had begun emigrating from Cornwall, creating two major diaspora branches: one in North America, and one in Australia.

The first Landeryou known to emigrate to North America was William Landeryou (christened 26 December 1824 in Kenwyn, Cornwall – died circa 1859 in Oakville, Ontario, Canada). His son, John Charles Landeryou (1860–1936), was born in Oakville but later moved to Saginaw, Michigan, establishing the main American family line that has remained primarily in Michigan for over a century.

Meanwhile, other Landeryou descendants migrated to Australia, likely from the same Cornish line. These parallel migrations highlight the widespread dispersal of Cornish families during the 19th century, many of whom left in search of work in mining and agriculture.

== Cultural and linguistic heritage ==
The name Landeryou belongs to a rich tradition of Cornish surnames rooted in geography and the Cornish language. As recorded in the traditional rhyme:

"By Ros-, Car-, Lan-, Tre-, Pol-, Pen-, Ye may know most Cornishmen."

Lan-: Meaning enclosure or church site, appears in many Cornish surnames (e.g., Lanyon, Lansallos) and fits with the Landeryou name.

: Oak trees in Cornish, reflects the natural woodland heritage of the region.

== People ==
Notable people with the surname include:

- Andrew Landeryou (born 1969), Australian former political blogger
- Bill Landeryou (1941–2019), Australian trade unionist and politician
- John Landeryou (1905–1982), Canadian chef and seniors rights activist
- Tim Landeryou (born 1984), Canadian retired racquetball player
