= Llechgynfarwy =

Hamlet in Anglesey, Wales

Coordinates: 53.3025°N 4.4309°W

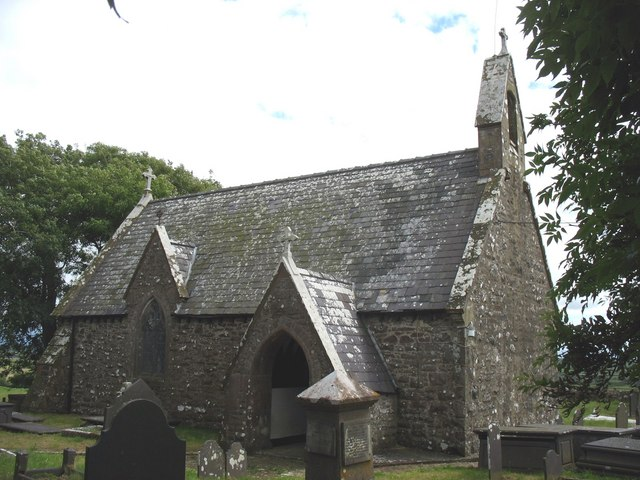
- St Cynfarwy's Church

- Location within Anglesey
- OS grid reference: SH 3811 8115
  - Cardiff: 136.5 mi (219.7 km)
  - London: 219.7 mi (353.6 km)
- Community: Tref Alaw
- Principal area: Anglesey
- Country: Wales
- Sovereign state: United Kingdom
- Post town: Caergybi
- Police: North Wales
- Fire: North Wales
- Ambulance: Welsh
- UK Parliament: Ynys Môn
- Senedd Cymru – Welsh Parliament: Bangor Conwy Môn

Llechgynfarwy (or Llechcynfarwy) is a village in the community of Tref Alaw, Anglesey, Wales. It is the location of St Cynfarwy's Church.

== History ==
Llechgynfarwy was a civil parish, at the 1971 census (the last before the abolition of the parish), Llechgynfarwy had a population of 118. In 1974 Llechcynfarwy became a community, on 1 April 1984 the community was abolished.

== See also ==
- List of localities in Wales by population
