= Llanllibio =

Coordinates: 53.310068°N 4.519142°W

- Location within Anglesey
- OS grid reference: SH 3226 8220
  - Cardiff: 138.5 mi (222.9 km)
  - London: 223 mi (359 km)
- Community: Bodedern
- Principal area: Anglesey
- Country: Wales
- Sovereign state: United Kingdom
- Post town: Holyhead
- Police: North Wales
- Fire: North Wales
- Ambulance: Welsh
- UK Parliament: Ynys Môn
- Senedd Cymru – Welsh Parliament: Bangor Conwy Môn

Llanllibio is a hamlet in the community of Bodedern, Anglesey, Wales, named after Saint Llibio which is 138.5 miles (222.9 km) from Cardiff and 223 miles (358.9 km) from London. St Llibio's Church, Llanllibio is now demolished.

Madam Wen the romantic character in the 17th century novels of William David Owen, was born in the parish in 1874.

== See also ==
- List of localities in Wales by population
