= Llanynghenedl =

Village in Anglesey, Wales

Coordinates: 53.299°N 4.530°W

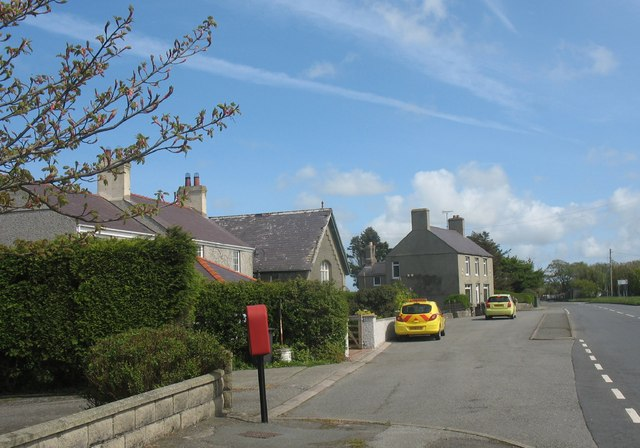

- Location within Anglesey
- Community: Valley
- Principal area: Anglesey
- Preserved county: Gwynedd
- Country: Wales
- Sovereign state: United Kingdom
- Police: North Wales
- Fire: North Wales
- Ambulance: Welsh
- UK Parliament: Ynys Môn
- Senedd Cymru – Welsh Parliament: Bangor Conwy Môn

Llanynghenedl is a village in Anglesey, in north-west Wales. It is located on the A5025 about 2 miles north-east of Valley and the A5. The village was the site of the historic St Enghenedl's Church, demolished in 1988. For a small settlement public transport links are good with Valley railway station being situated on the North Wales Coast Line and several bus routes connecting the towns of Holyhead and Amlwch running directly through it.

Until 1984, Llanynghenedl was a community.
