= Llibio =

6th-century Welsh saint

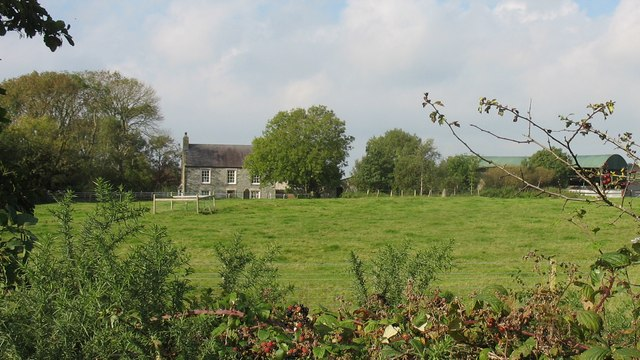
Site of the former church at Llanllibio.

Saint Llibio was a 6th-century saint of North Wales and Patron Saint of Llanllibio.

His church was in ruins by 1776 and has subsequently been demolished. He give his name to the village of Llanllibio. His feast day in Roman Catholic Church is 28 February.
