= Bodedern =

Village and community in Anglesey, Wales

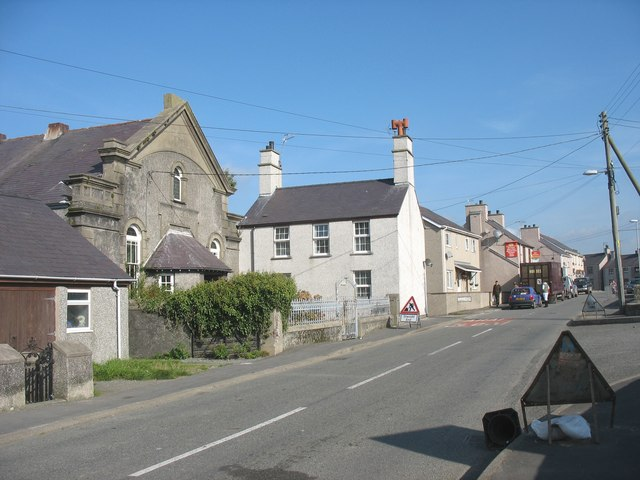
- Bodedern

- Location within Anglesey
- Population: 1,051 (2011)
- OS grid reference: SH3380
- Community: Bodedern
- Principal area: Anglesey
- Preserved county: Gwynedd
- Country: Wales
- Sovereign state: United Kingdom
- Post town: HOLYHEAD
- Postcode district: LL65
- Dialling code: 01407
- Police: North Wales
- Fire: North Wales
- Ambulance: Welsh
- UK Parliament: Ynys Môn
- Senedd Cymru – Welsh Parliament: Bangor Conwy Môn
- List of places UK Wales Anglesey 53.295°N 4.500°W Map of the community

Bodedern is a village and community in the west of Anglesey, Wales. At the 2001 census, it had a population of 1,074, decreasing slightly to 1,051 at the 2011 census. The community includes the settlements of Llanllibio and Pen-llyn.

== Location ==
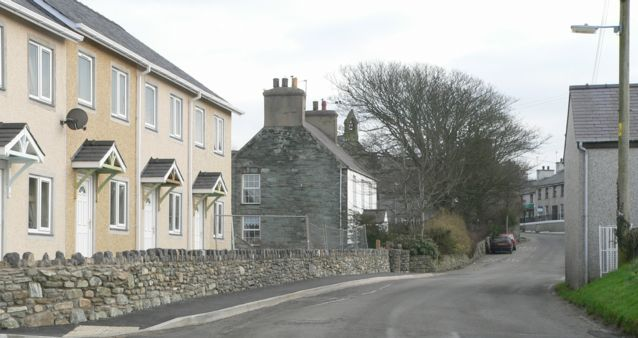
Bodedern

Bodedern lies on the B5109, about 1 mile (1.6 km) east of its junction with the A4025 south of Llanfachraeth. About 2 miles (3.2 km) to the south, beyond the A55 road lie the villages of Caergeiliog and Llanfihangel yn Nhowyn. The Valley Wetlands, an area of lakes and marshes and a RSPB bird sanctuary, lie between these two villages. Bodedern is the closest village to the island's largest natural lake, Llyn Llywenan, which lies 1 kilometre (0.6 mi) to the north.

== Education ==
A Welsh-language playgroup Cylch Meithrin Bodedern currently serves the community with the support of Mudiad Meithrin.

Ysgol Gynradd Bodedern provides Welsh-medium primary education to the village and the surrounding rural area. As of 2024, there were 98 pupils enrolled at the school. 66.3 per cent of pupils speak Welsh at home.

A Welsh-medium secondary school, Ysgol Uwchradd Bodedern, is located in the village.

== Governance ==
Map showing Bodedern Community, on the north-west side of Anglesey, Wales

=== Local Government ===
Bodedern forms part of the Bro'r Llynoedd electoral division and is currently represented in the Isle of Anglesey County Council by councillors Gwilym O Jones (Y Grŵp Annibynnol) and Ken Taylor (Plaid Cymru). The village also has a Community Council, currently chaired by Jane Ann Roberts.

=== Senedd ===
The village is currently represented in the Senedd by Ynys Môn constituency member Rhun ap Iorwerth (Plaid Cymru). It is also represented by four North Wales regional members, namely Carolyn Thomas (Labour), Llyr Huws Gruffydd (Plaid Cymru), Sam Rowlands and Mark Isherwood (Welsh Conservatives).

=== House of Commons ===
The village is currently represented in the House of Commons by Ynys Môn constituency member Llinos Medi (Plaid Cymru).

== Sport ==
The village's football team is C.P.D. Boded, who currently play in the North Wales Coast West Football League. It hosted several matches during the 2019 Inter Games Football Tournament.

== Listed buildings ==
The parish church (St Edern's Church, Bodedern) dates from the 14th century and is a Grade II* listed building, being listed because it is considered a good example of a late medieval church with some fine interior fittings.

Presaddfed Hall is a small grade II* listed country house which stands amongst woodlands to the north-east of the village at the southern tip of Llyn Llywenan. The main block was built in 1686 and is joined to an earlier block by a later block built in 1875. A walled garden lies to the east of the house. The manor was once the seat of the Lewis family, William Lewis (born 1526) is an example who served as High Sheriff of Anglesey, and was a politician holding public offices in parliament. The hall is now a country hotel.

Presaddfed Burial Chamber is a pair of Neolithic chamber tombs located a short distance northwest of Bodedern near the southern end of Llyn Llywenan.

The other scheduled monument within the community is an early Christian cemetery, east of the village, which is thought to be the location of an ancient chapel, Eglwys Ederyn. The site, at which 114 burials were recorded, was excavated in 1971, revealing several stone cists, and a stone inscribed with the word 'Ercagni', now kept in Bodedern Church.

== 2017 National Eisteddfod ==
Bodedern was the site of the 2017 National Eisteddfod of Wales, which took place from 4 to 13 August. Between 13,000 and 16,000 people visited the Maes on each day, with many arriving by shuttle bus from the Mona Showground.

== Notable people ==
- William Roberts (1830–1899) a British physician whose work contributed to the discovery of penicillin
- Dion Donohue (born 1993), footballer, with over 250 club caps
