= St Enghenedl's Church, Llanynghenedl =

Coordinates: 53.299027°N 4.526968°W

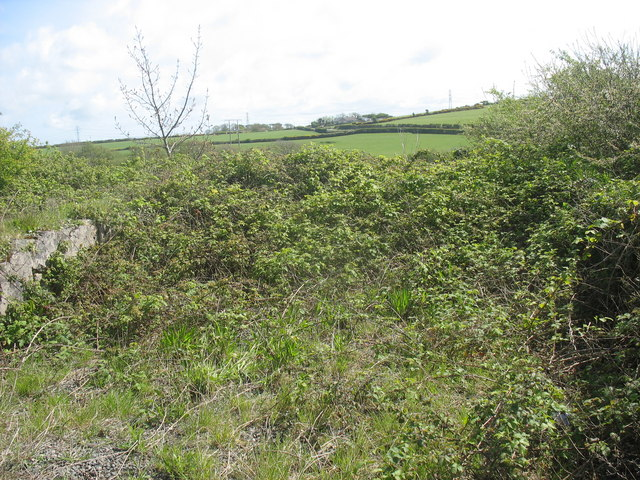
- The interior of the former church

- Location in Anglesey
- Location: Llanynghenedl, Anglesey
- Country: Wales
- Previous denomination: Church in Wales

History
- Status: Church
- Founded: c.620
- Dedication: Enghenedl

Architecture
- Functional status: Demolished
- Architect: Henry Kennedy (1862)
- Completed: 1862, replacing a 13th/14th-century church
- Demolished: 1988

Specifications
- Length: 43 ft 6 in (13.3 m)
- Width: 15 ft 6 in (4.7 m)

St Enghenedl's Church, Llanynghenedl, is a former parish church in Anglesey, north Wales, dedicated to the son of a 6th-century King of Powys. According to the 19th-century antiquarian Angharad Llwyd, the first church in Llanynghenedl was erected in about 620. A new church was erected in 1862, replacing a building that the 19th-century clergyman and antiquarian Harry Longueville Jones noted as dating in part from the late 13th or early 14th century, based on the decorations on the south doorway. The church later fell into disuse as a result of the growth of the nearby village of Valley and the church there. In 1988, St Enghenedl's was dismantled and re-erected as an extension to St Mihangel's, Llanfihangel yn Nhowyn, so that St Mihangel's could serve as the church for RAF Valley. The former churchyard of St Enghenedl's is still visible but is now overgrown.

== History and location ==
The site of the former St Enghenedl's Church is in the village of Llanynghenedl, in Anglesey, north Wales, in the north-west of the island about 4 miles (6.4 km) east of the port town of Holyhead. Little is known about Enghenedl, the saint to whom the church was dedicated. He was one of the sons of Cynan Garwyn, King of Powys in the late 6th century, and a brother of his successor, Selyf ap Cynan or Selyf Sarffgadau. This is the only church recorded as being dedicated to Enghenedl, whose feast day was celebrated on Quinquagesima (the Sunday before Ash Wednesday). The village takes its name from the church; the Welsh word llan originally meant "enclosure" and then "church", and "‑ynghenedl" is a variant of the saint's name.

According to the 19th-century antiquarian Angharad Llwyd, it is said that the first church was built here in about 620. By the time she was writing, the church was attached to the parish of St Machraeth's Church, Llanfachraeth. St Enghenedl's was rebuilt in 1862 by Henry Kennedy, the architect of the Diocese of Bangor. Another church was subsequently built in the parish, in the village of Valley. As Valley grew, St Enghenedl's declined in use and it eventually closed. It was dismantled in 1988 and rebuilt as an extension to St Mihangel's Church, Llanfihangel yn Nhowyn, so that it could serve as the church for RAF Valley. St Enghenedl's was re-erected with its west end adjoining the west end of St Mihangel's, which had also been built by Kennedy in 1862. The old east window of St Enghenedl's now faces west, and the bellcote is in the middle of the roof. The churchyard, gravestones, and lychgate of St Enghenedl's remain in their original location, but the churchyard is now overgrown.

== Architecture and fittings ==
Writing in 1862 (but before Kennedy's rebuilding), the clergyman and antiquarian Harry Longueville Jones recorded that the church was 40 by 14 feet (12.2 by 4.3 m) internally, divided by some woodwork into a nave and chancel. Judging by the decoration he considered that the south doorway dated from the late 13th or early 14th century. He also noted that the 12th-century font had an ornamental design similar to other fonts elsewhere in Anglesey. The east window had two lights (sections of window separated by stone mullions), and was similar to that of St Ylched's Church, Llechylched (another Anglesey church that no longer exists).

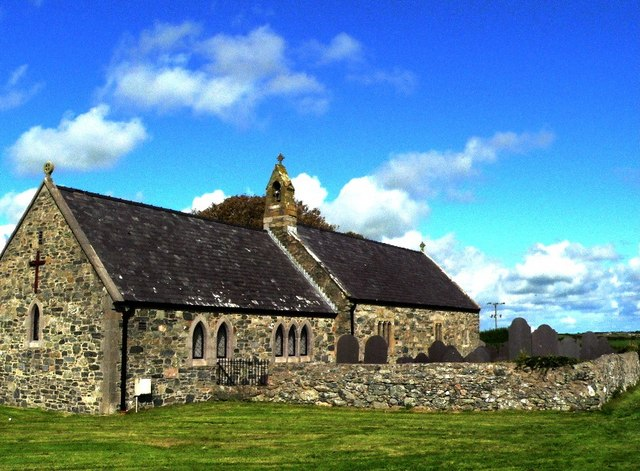
St Mihangel's Church, Llanfihangel yn Nhowyn, extended in 1988 by re-erecting St Enghenedl's at the west end (the left in this picture)

A 1937 survey of Kennedy's rebuilt church by the Royal Commission on Ancient and Historical Monuments in Wales and Monmouthshire said that it was formed from a continuous nave and chancel, measuring in total 43 1/2 by 15 1/2 feet (13.3 by 4.7 m). The church, which was at that time in good condition, was entered through a porch on the south side, and there was a vestry on the north side. As well as the font, the church contained some 18th-century memorials. The font is now in the south chapel of St Cybi's Church, Holyhead.

A survey of church plate within the Bangor diocese in 1906 recorded a silver chalice, 7 5/8 inches (just over 19 cm) tall, with the Chester date mark for 1724–25. It was inscribed with the names of the vicar (Thomas Vincent) and the two churchwardens (Griffith Edward and Owen Hughes), and the year 1724. It was described as resembling "an inverted bell, standing on a stem". There was also an accompanying plain paten cover, 3 5/8 inches (just over 9 cm) in diameter. Both bore the maker's mark of William Richardson, the letters "Ri" in a square shield below a crescent. The paten also had the mark of a leopard's head, indicating that it had been assayed in London.

== Assessment ==
Angharad Llwyd described the church in 1833 as "a lofty but small edifice", adding that several parts "display marks of very great antiquity." Harry Longueville Jones said that its size made it "one of the least considerable" of the churches in Anglesey. The Welsh politician and church historian Sir Stephen Glynne visited the church in July 1873. He said that it was a small church with "some small rude (rood)windows".
