= Llanedwen =

Coordinates: 53.192857°N 4.234739°W

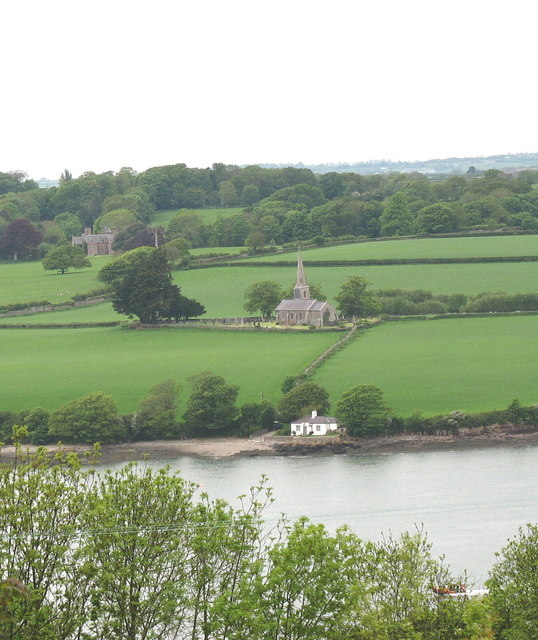
- St Edwen's Church, Llanedwen from Y Felinheli

- Location within Anglesey
- OS grid reference: SH 5080 6853
  - Cardiff: 126.5 mi (203.6 km)
  - London: 208.8 mi (336.0 km)
- Community: Llanddaniel Fab
- Principal area: Anglesey
- Country: Wales
- Sovereign state: United Kingdom
- Post town: Llanfair Pwllgwyngyll
- Police: North Wales
- Fire: North Wales
- Ambulance: Welsh
- UK Parliament: Ynys Môn
- Senedd Cymru – Welsh Parliament: Bangor Conwy Môn

Llanedwen is a village in the community of Llanddaniel Fab on the Isle of Anglesey, in Wales. It is situated opposite the village of Y Felinheli. St Edwen's Church is the main parish church of the village.

== See also ==
- List of localities in Wales by population
