= Edwen =

Saxon princess and saint

St. Edwen was a 7th-century Saxon princess and saint. She is believed to have been the virgin daughter or niece of King Edwin of Northumbria, whose conversion to Christianity in 627 was contested by his lords. St. Edwen is thought to have grown up in the court of King Cadfan of North Wales, in Caerseiont (Caernarfon) and is credited for founding a church in 640 on the site of the current St. Edwen's Church in Llanedwen, Anglesey, Wales. Her feast day is November 6.
