= Llyn Llywenan =

Body of water in Wales

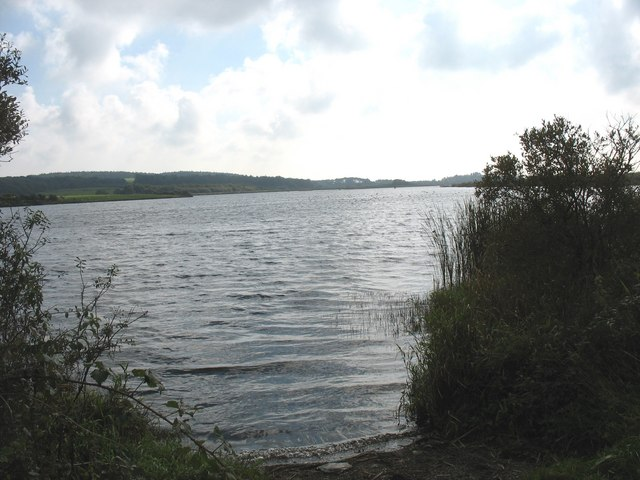
- Llyn Llywenan

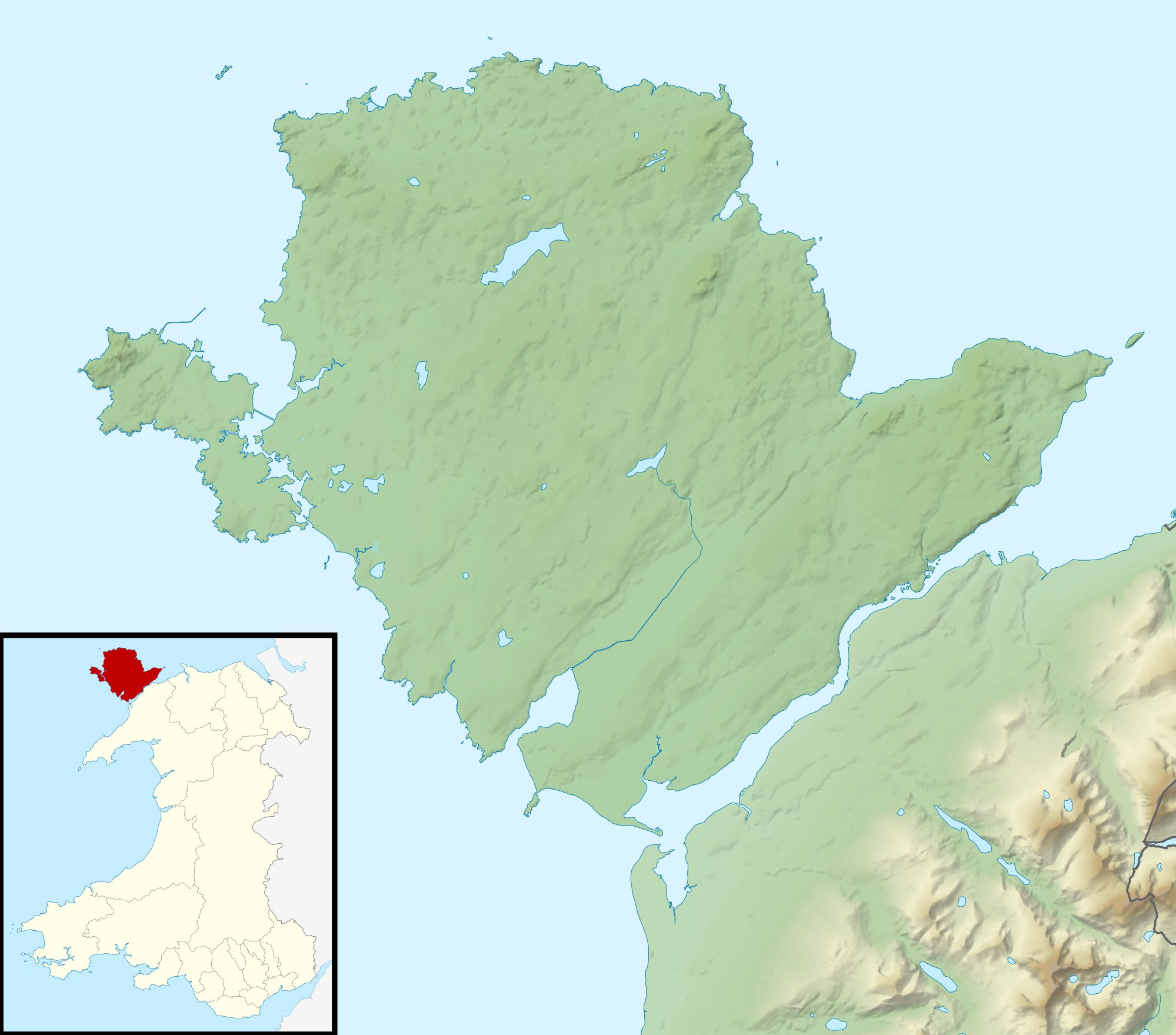
- Location within Anglesey
- Location: western Anglesey, Wales
- Coordinates: 53°18′20″N 4°28′50″W
- Basin countries: United Kingdom

Llyn Llywenan (Welsh for 'Yew tree lake') is a lake in western Anglesey, Wales found just over 1 kilometre (0.6 mi) north of the village of Bodedern and 9 kilometres (5.6 mi) east of the town of Holyhead. At a maximum length of 1.1 kilometres (0.7 mi) and breadth of 0.4 kilometres (0.2 mi) it has a surface area of only 0.4 square kilometres (0.2 sq mi). This makes it the largest natural lake on the island—both Llyn Alaw and Llyn Cefni are larger but are man made.

The lake, a Site of Special Scientific Interest, is situated 34 metres (112 ft) above mean sea level and was chosen as an SSSI as there are uncommon aquatic plants there, as well as the fact that the lake is very shallow and could in the next hundred years or so be filled with silt. There is a small, rather featureless, island in the middle of the southern section of the lake which is roughly 35 metres (115 ft) across.

There are two neolithic burial mounds immediately to the south of the lake, one of which is quite complete. The character Lord Owen Griffiths for the American role playing game Castle Falkenstein has a lover Gwagged Annwn Nimüe who, in the game world, lives by the lake.
