= Trefignath =

Burial chamber in Anglesey, Wales

Trefignath chambered tomb and standing stones
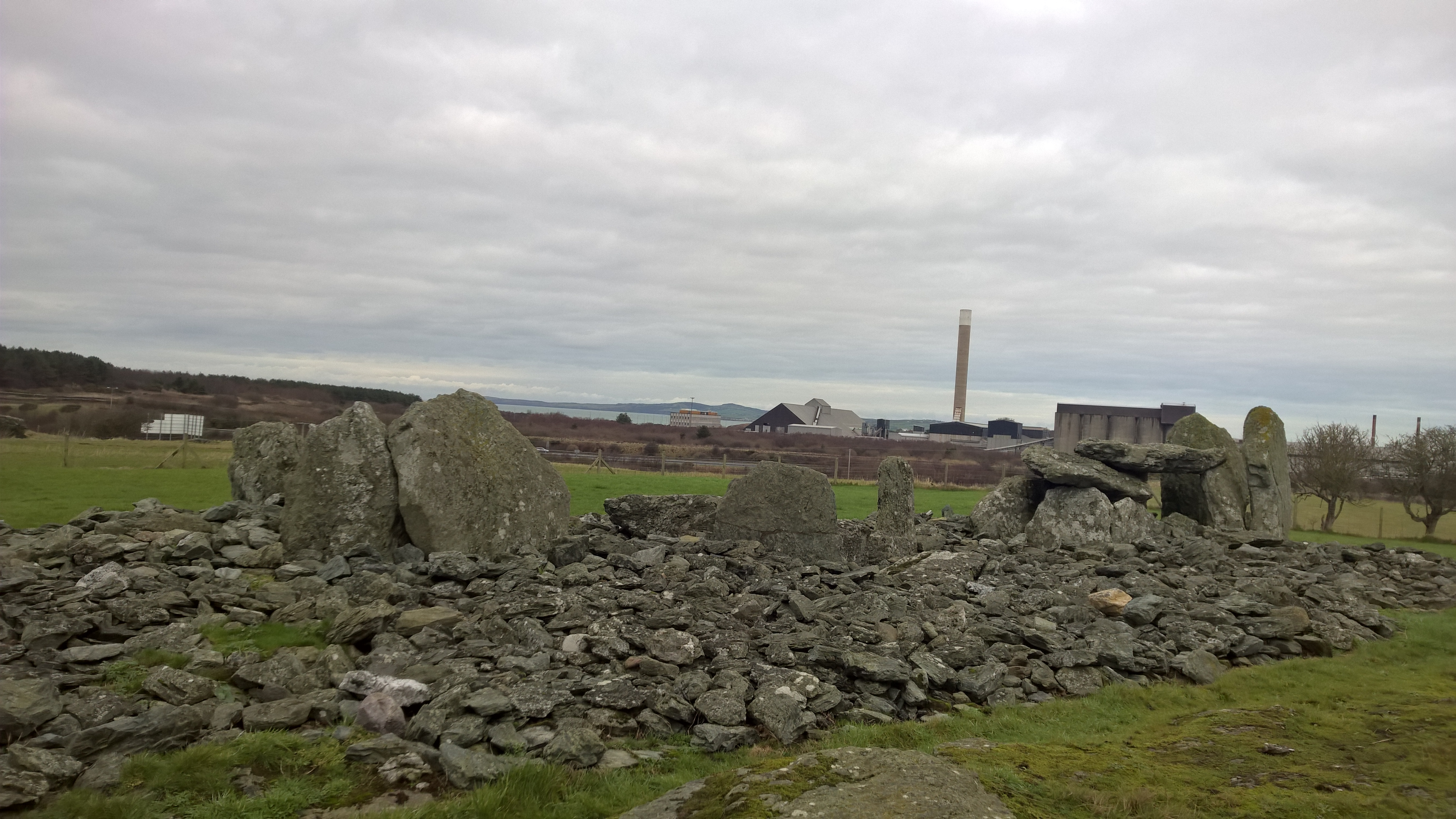
- Trefignath, cairn and tombs from the east; first tomb on left, second in middle, third on right
- Interactive map of Trefignath chambered tomb and standing stones
- 53.2932°N 4.6143°W
- Type: chambered tomb and stone alignment
- Periods: Neolithic
- Location: Holy Island, Wales
- Region: Great Britain

Site notes
- Material: Stone
- Length: 23 m (75 ft)
- Width: 9 m (30 ft)
- Archaeologists: Christopher Smith, Frances Lynch
- Management: Cadw
- Public access: Yes
- Scheduled Ancient Monument

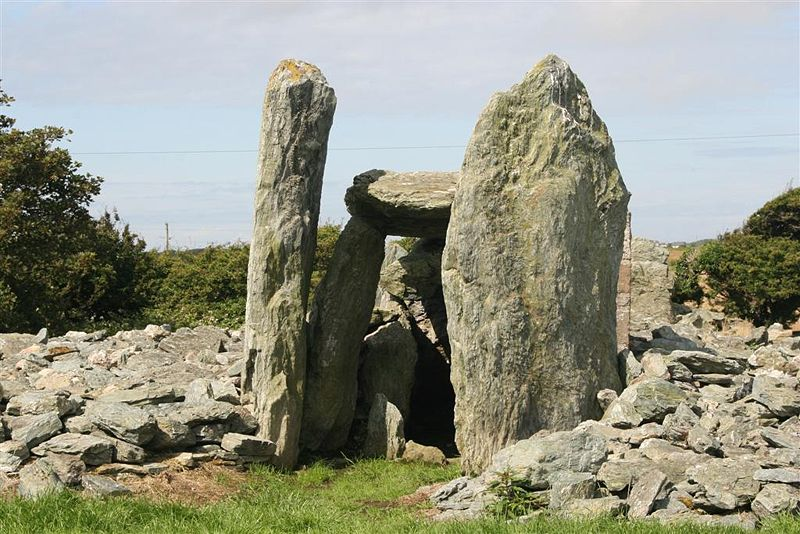
Trefignath burial chamber in 2007

Trefignath is a Neolithic-era burial chamber near Trearddur, south of Holyhead on Holy Island, off Anglesey in Wales. In its most complete form it included a large cairn covering three stone tombs, set on a small knoll. It was excavated between 1977 and 1979, revealing several phases of occupation with three separate burial chambers built in succession. It is a scheduled ancient monument, maintained by Cadw.

Trefignath is adjacent to an alignment of small standing stones which extends some 350 metres northwestwards. Beyond these, some 450 metres from Trefignath, is the larger Tŷ Mawr Standing Stone.

== Ecological development ==
The site is on a small rocky knoll. It is close to a marshy area, Trefignath peat bog (mostly filled in when the railroad to Holyhead was built). Pollen preserved in the peat records the changes of vegetation since the Ice Age; the sequence begins with sub-arctic post-glacial shrubs with grasses and other herbs, through the early development of forest dominated by birch and grasses, to climax forest with oak, elm, ivy, and hazel. At this stage deciduous forest covered almost all of the land area, and this would have developed a deep, rich, and well-drained soil. Initial forest clearance is recorded by increasing carbon fragments, and the later landscape clearance by grasses and grassland weeds. Some heather pollen indicates that heath had formed on depauperized and acidified soils.

== Before tombs ==
The tomb is sited on a low ridge of rock, probably a roche moutonnée shaped by a moving ice-sheet.

Flint and chert tools, and hearths, were found on the natural ground surface under the cairn. Charcoal in this context was carbon-dated at 3100 BCE, plus or minus 70 years. Pottery sherds left before the building of the tomb were un-decorated Irish Sea ware of the early and middle Neolithic. Local clays and rocks probably provided the material for most of the pottery, but one small inclusion of perthitic biotite granite in a potsherd cannot be sourced locally and this pot may have traveled from Ireland, Scotland, or Cornwall.

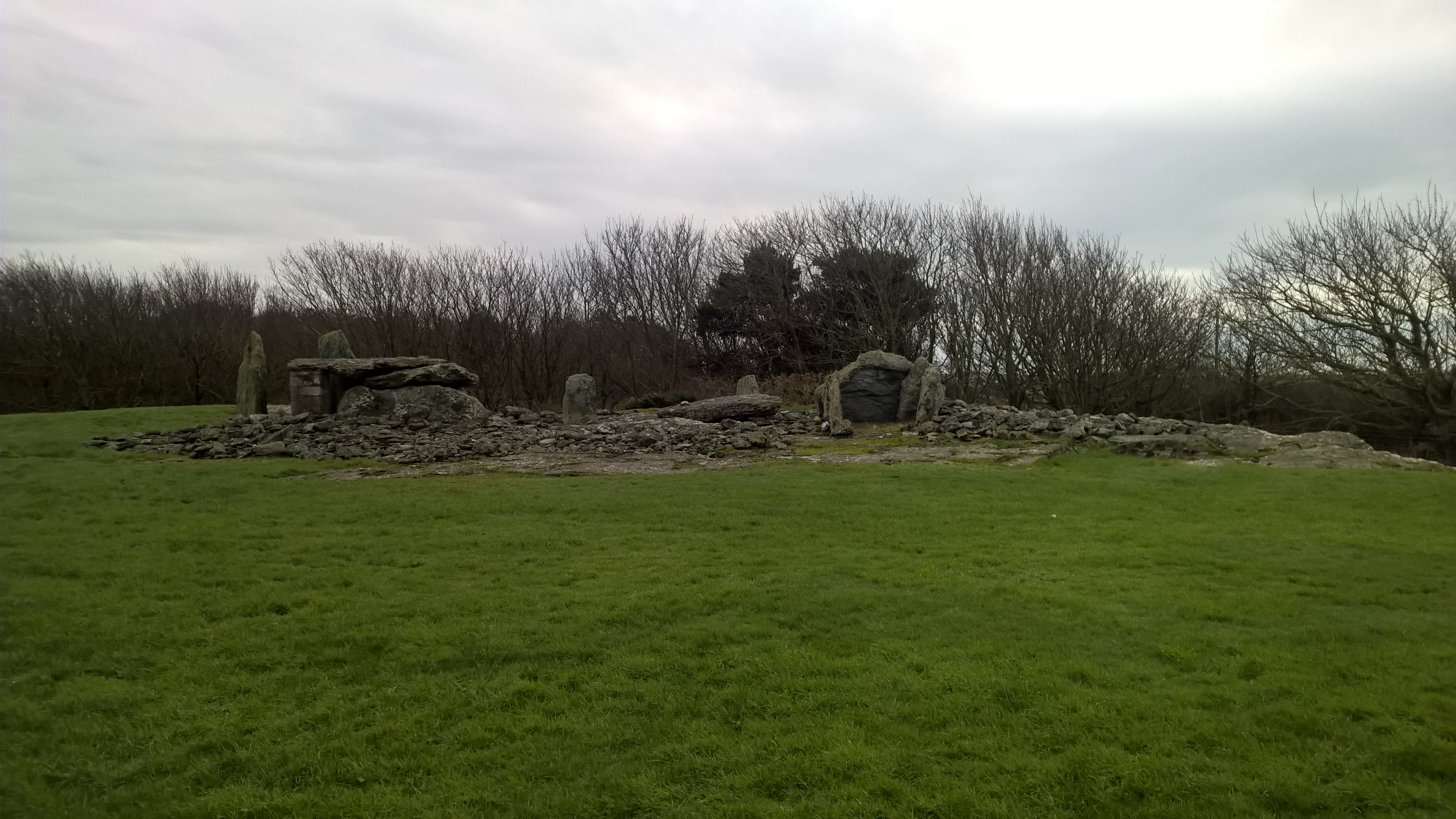
Trefignath from the north-west; first tomb on right, second in middle, third on left

== First chamber ==
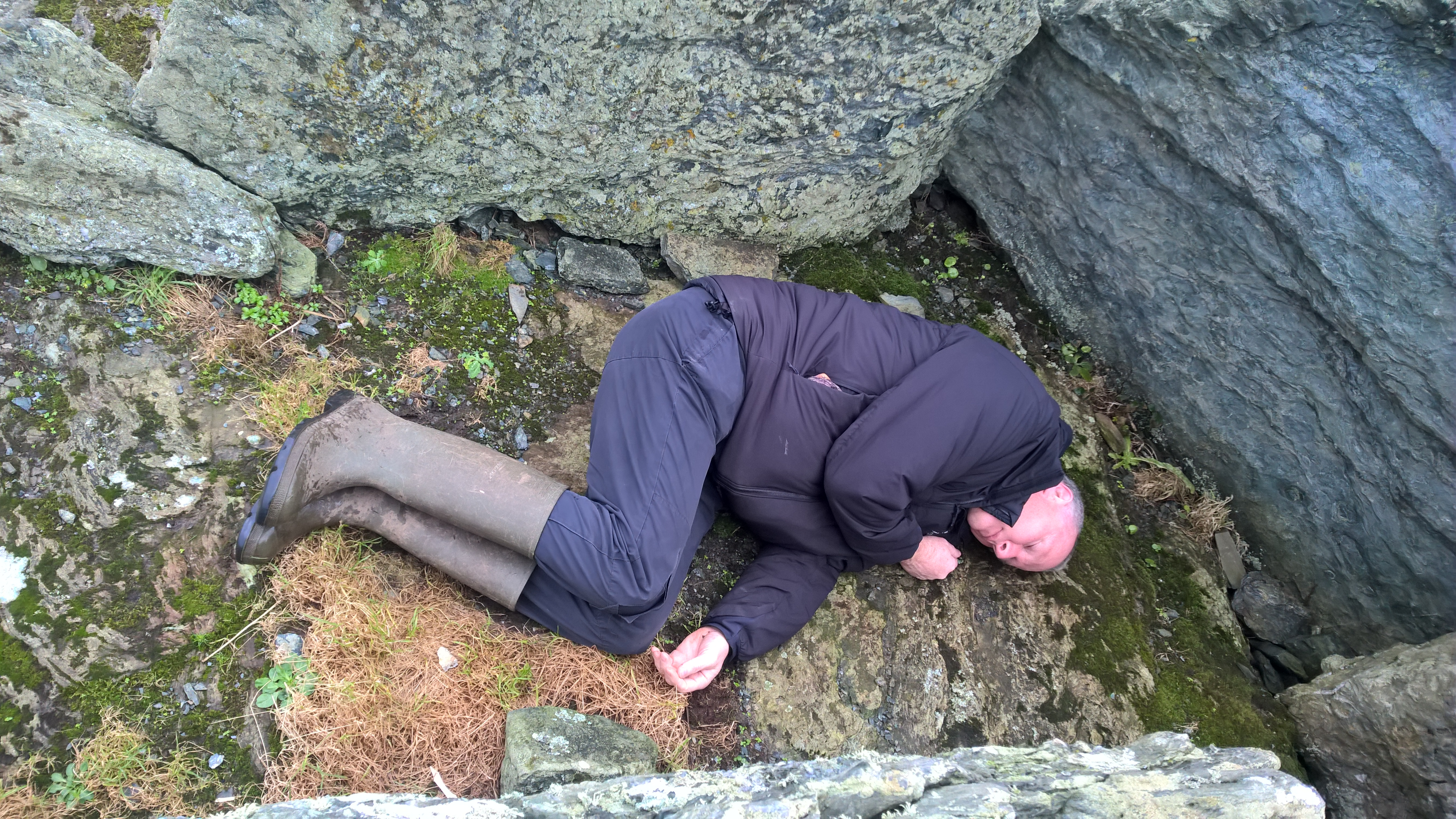
Trefignath, large adult in first tomb, fetal position

The first tomb to be built was at the western end of the present mound. It had a simple, square chamber, with an entrance facing north-west, and was covered by a circular mound of stones (a cairn). It is thought that this may be the remains of a passage grave. Pollen evidence showed that it was built on an area of grassland, though there was woodland not far away and also nearby arable. There are few remaining finds, but the pottery – heavily decorated Peterborough ware pottery of late Neolithic date – suggests that the chamber continued in use for an extended period.

== Second chamber ==
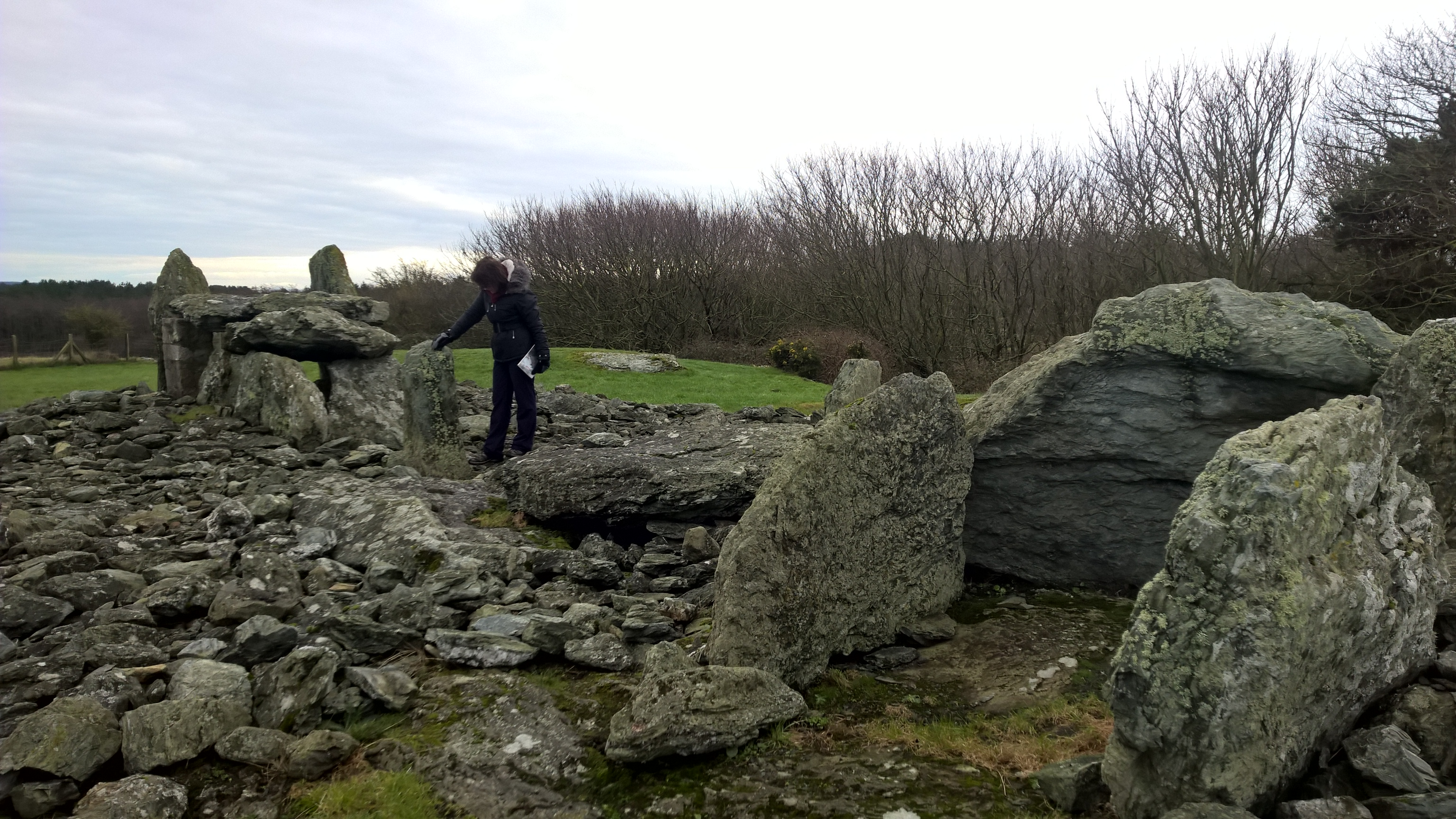
Trefignath burial chambers, small adult on site of middle, second chamber

The second to be constructed was rectangular in shape and had two stones marking the entrance from a narrow forecourt. Over this, and over the earlier chamber, a long, wedge-shaped mound was constructed, which formed a long cairn. The resulting mound was edged with drystone walling.

== Third chamber ==
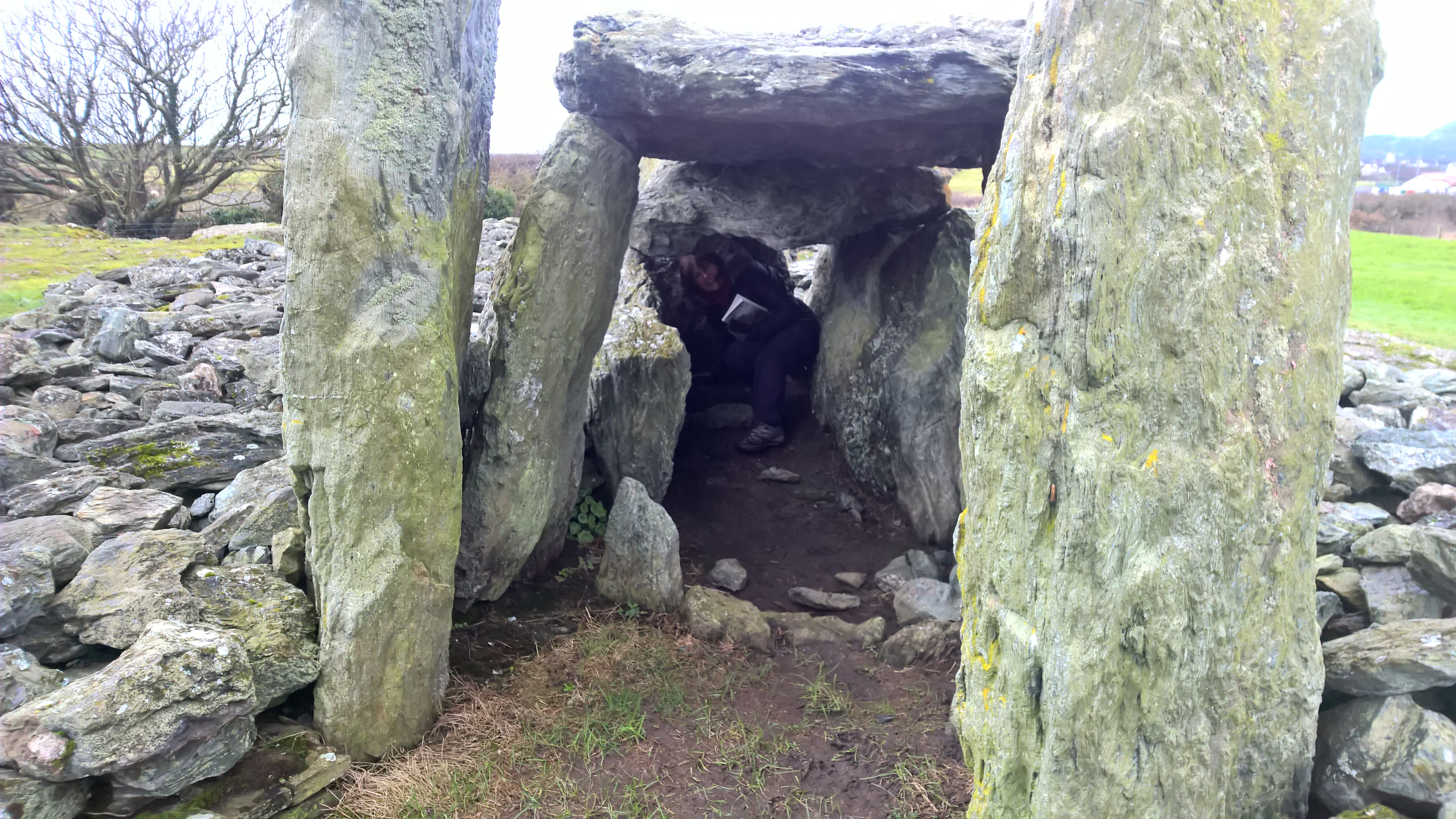
Trefignath, small adult in third, eastward tomb

The third chamber, at the eastern end, was added to the front of the central chamber. It was also constructed with large entrance stones and in the same style, but there was no longer any means of access to the central chamber. The long cairn was then extended to cover this chamber as well. Late Neolithic pottery was found at the entrance.

== Alignment of standing stones ==
A line of small standing stones extends north-west from the burial chamber. Its alignment points, within one degree, to the winter solstice sunrise.

== Tŷ Mawr standing stone ==
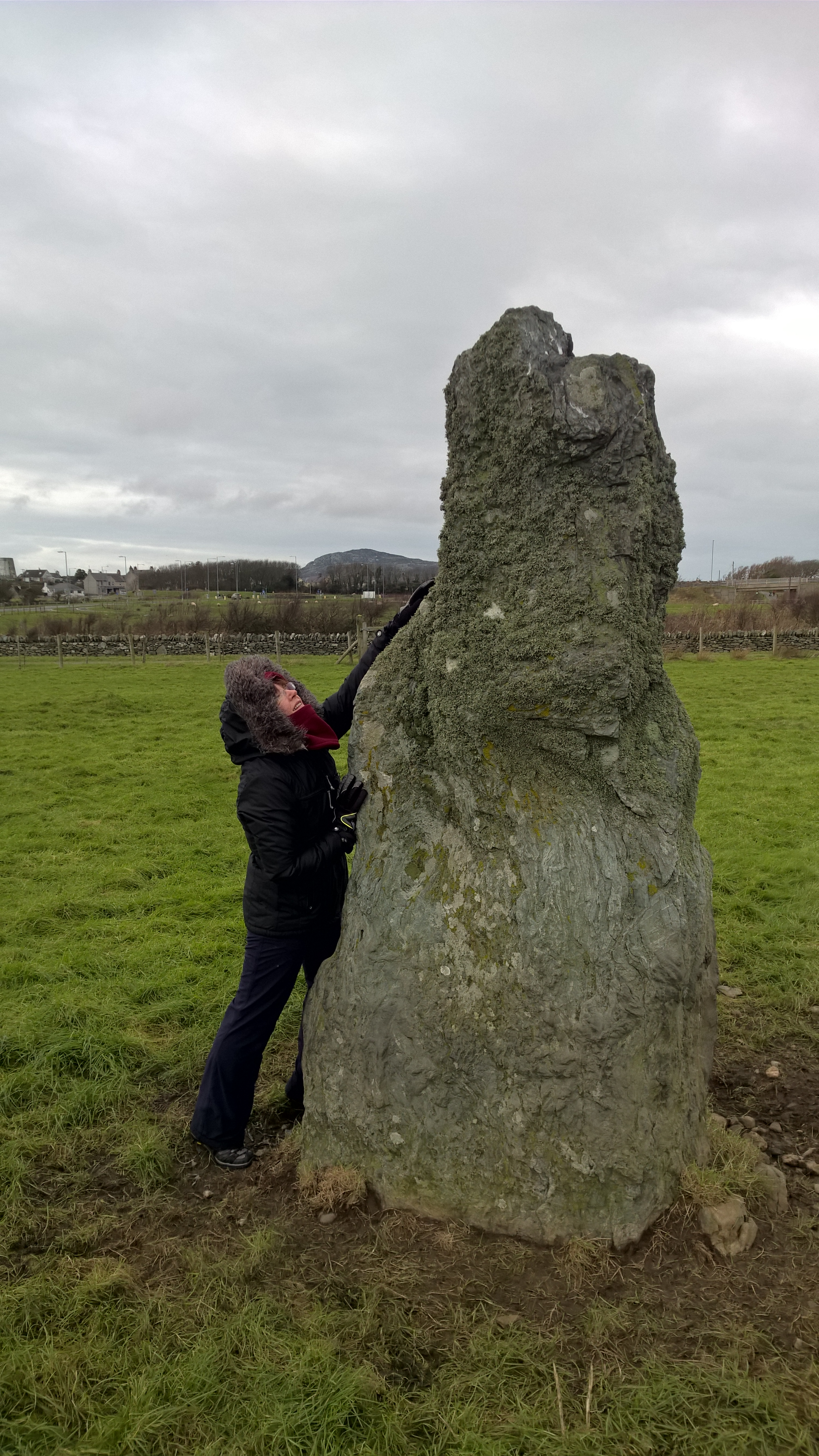
Tŷ Mawr stone near Trefignath, small adult for scale

== Early modern period: written accounts, re-imaginings, and partial destruction ==
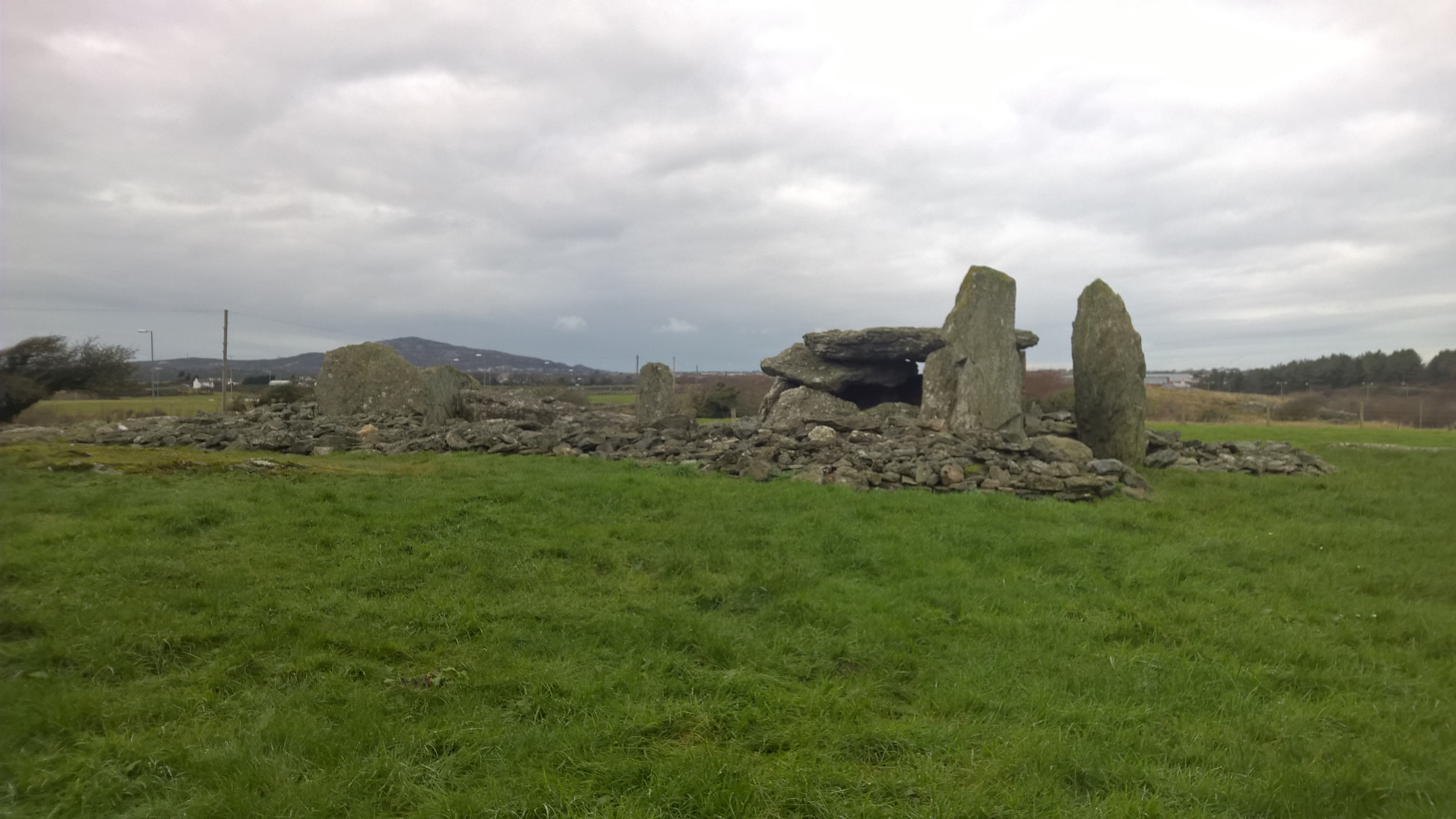
Trefignath, tombs from the south-east. Holyhead Mountain in the background.

The derivation of the name Trefignath is uncertain. No version of it appears in the 1352 extent of Anglesey, and the name was first recorded (as Trefignerth) in 1624. In early records the name referred to a small farm rather than the monument. The initial element is the common word "tref", meaning a homestead or hamlet. The remainder may be an unrecorded personal name containing the element "nerth", or it may be composed of "mign", meaning swamp or quagmire, and an unknown suffix "eth".

The monument is first noted (as Y-Lleche) in 1655 or 1660 when John Aubrey visited it.

The site had been seriously disturbed by the middle 1600s. Part of the cairn had been removed, exposing the chambers, and some of the standing stones had fallen. William Owen Stanley in 1867 states that the monument had been further damaged about 1790, when the capstones were removed, to be re-used as gateposts and lintels. 'Urns and bones', now lost, were found at that time. Complete destruction had only been avoided by the intervention of Stanley's grandmother Margaret, heiress to the Penrhos estate which included the site.

In 1856 a visitor made extravagant use of the ideas of the Celtic Revival to imagine Druids using the location for human sacrifice: "Here the Druid priests once offered their dreadful sacrifices, and performed their idolatrous worship, in their long white garments, their temples enwreathed with chaplets of oak-leaves, the magic wand in their hand, and on their head a serpent's egg, an ensign of their order; thus attired they went forth to sacrifice, standing round the crimson-stained altar, shrouded with superstition, mystery and death. Here the victims, bound with cords for slaughter and sacrifice, filled the air with shrieks of agony and screams of horror... Here once lived and worshipped another race of beings, who from their forest haunts came forth in mystic power to invoke their awe-throned deity with human sacrifices."

In 1911 the then owner, Edward Stanley, 4th Baron Stanley of Alderley, placed the site in the care of the government under the First Commissioner of Works, and they and their successor bodies (in 2016, Cadw) have looked after the site since then.

== Access ==
The site is close to the main dual carriageway A55 road to Holyhead. There is a small car park near the site. The burial chambers are in the care of Cadw; the site is open to the public, free of charge, throughout the year, except for around Christmas and the New Year. Access is via a stone stile over a wall, with a walk across a grassy field, a distance of about 100 m (300 ft).

Trefignath burial chamber is a scheduled ancient monument. The Royal Commission on the Ancient and Historical Monuments of Wales curates the archaeological, architectural and historic records for the site. These include digital photographs, colour and black and white photographs, drawings, NMR site files, and Cadw guardianship records.
