= Lampen =

Lampen is a surname. Notable people with the surname include:

- Aleksander Lampén (1879–1935), Finnish engineer, politician
- John Lampen (born 1938), English Quaker and writer
- Timo Lampén (1934–1999), Finnish basketball player
