= Saint Rhian =

- Honored in: Roman Catholic Church, Eastern Orthodox Church, Anglican communion
- Feast: March 8

Saint Rhian was a Welsh abbot. He is a virtually unknown saint other than his feast day, which is March 8. The village name of Llanrhian, Pembrokeshire, commemorates him and its church is dedicated to St Rhian.

The Church of St. Rhian (Llanrhian) in Pembrokeshire, Wales

He is the patron saint of lovers, beekeepers, epilepsy, fainting, and the plague.
