= Llanfihangel yn Nhowyn =

Village in Anglesey, Wales

Coordinates: 53.267129°N 4.518729°W

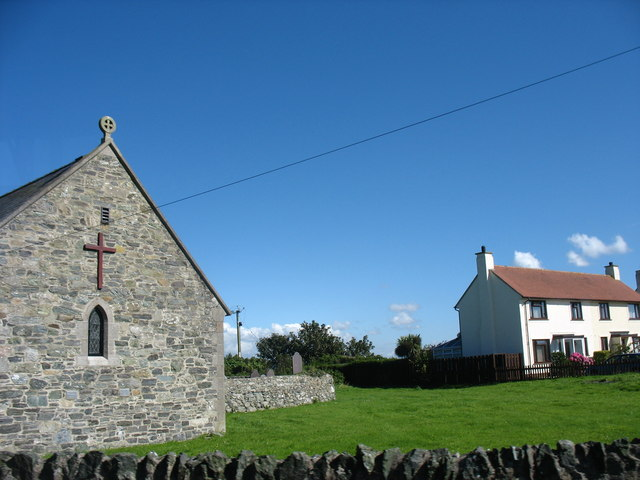

- Location within Anglesey
- Principal area: Anglesey
- Preserved county: Gwynedd
- Country: Wales
- Sovereign state: United Kingdom
- Police: North Wales
- Fire: North Wales
- Ambulance: Welsh
- UK Parliament: Ynys Môn
- Senedd Cymru – Welsh Parliament: Bangor Conwy Môn

Llanfihangel yn Nhowyn (Welsh pronunciation) is a village in Anglesey, in north-west Wales. The church in the village, St Mihangel's, is a Grade II listed building and is the chapel for the nearby airbase, RAF Valley. It is in the community of Llanfair-yn-Neubwll
