= St Gwenllwyfo's Church =

Coordinates: 53.378809°N 4.290799°W

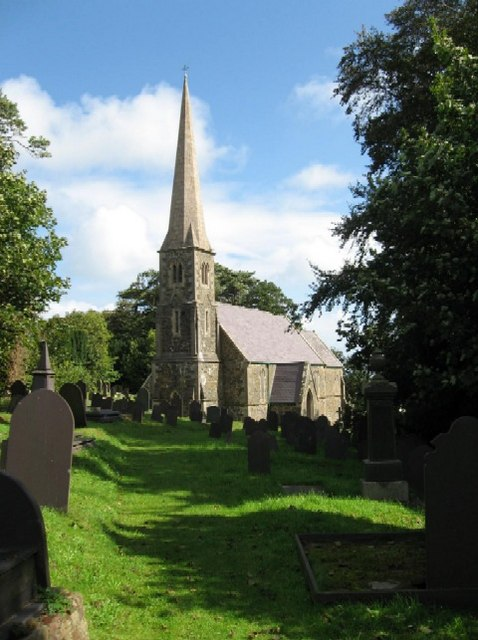
- The church from the south-west

- Location in Anglesey
- Location: Dulas, Anglesey
- Country: Wales
- Denomination: Church in Wales

History
- Status: Parish church
- Founded: 1856
- Dedication: Llanwenllwyfo

Architecture
- Functional status: Active
- Heritage designation: Grade II*
- Designated: 12 May 1970
- Architect: Henry Kennedy
- Architectural type: Church
- Style: Gothic Revival

Specifications
- Materials: Rubble masonry with slate roof

Administration
- Province: Wales
- Diocese: Diocese of Bangor
- Archdeaconry: Bangor
- Deanery: Twrcelyn
- Parish: Amlwch

St Gwenllwyfo's Church is a 19th-century parish church near the village of Dulas, in Anglesey, Wales. It was built between 1854 and 1856 to replace an earlier church in the parish, also dedicated to St Gwenllwyfo, which needed repair and had become too small for its congregation. The new church was built nearer to the Llys Dulas estate, whose owner contributed £936 towards the total cost of £1,417, rather than near the area where many of the parishioners lived. In 1876, Sir Arundell Neave (who had married into the family that owned Llys Dulas) donated 27 panels of 15th and 16th-century stained glass that had once belonged to a Flemish monastery.

The church is still used for worship by the Church in Wales, one of four in the parish of Amlwch. It is a Grade II* listed building, a national designation given to "particularly important buildings of more than special interest", in particular because of its "fine collection" of stained glass.

== History and location ==
St Gwenllwyfo's Church stands in a churchyard on a sloping site on the west side of a rural road, about 0.5 miles (0.8 km) from the beach at Dulas, in the north-east of Anglesey, Wales. It was built in the mid-19th century at a cost of £1,417 (Note: £1,417 in 1854 is worth £2,870,000 in today's terms, adjusting for changes in GDP.) to replace its medieval predecessor, which was then abandoned. The old church, also dedicated to St Gwenllwyfo (a 7th-century woman about whom nothing else is known) was in need of repair and its congregation was too large for the building. Although many in the congregation lived in Nebo (in the north of the parish), it was decided to build the new church about two-thirds of a mile from its predecessor (about 1.1 km) to the south-west in the vicinity of the Llys Dulas estate, whose owners had long been connected with the church.

The largest donation towards the new parish church (£936) (Note: £936 in 1854 is worth £1,890,000 in today's terms, adjusting for changes in GDP.) came from Gertrude, the widow of William Hughes, 1st Baron Dinorben (died 1852), owner of Llys Dulas. Gertrude, whose husband had become rich from copper mining on Anglesey at Parys Mountain, also rebuilt the main house of Llys Dulas in the mid-1850s; it was demolished in 1976 after becoming derelict. Her daughter and heiress Gwyn Gertrude Hughes laid the foundation stone on 14 September 1854, using a silver trowel and ebony mallet. A box placed underneath the stone contained a Bible, a prayer book, a document with details of the event and an example of every British coin minted in that year. Those present were addressed in Welsh by the clergyman James Williams and in English by the curate of the parish, Morris Williams (more commonly known by his bardic name "Nicander"). The church (designed by Henry Kennedy, the architect for the Diocese of Bangor) opened in 1856.

Gwyn Gertrude Hughes married Sir Arundell Neave in 1871. He donated some 15th and 16th-century Flemish stained glass inherited from his father to the church in 1876. After Gwyn's death in 1916 she was buried in a vault under the chancel of the church, as her mother had been in 1871. Previous members of the family had been buried in the ancestral vault at St George's Church, Kinmel, but a family dispute from 1849 led to a new vault being required.

St Gwenllwyfo's is still used for worship by the Church in Wales. It is one of four churches in the parish of Amlwch, along with St Eleth's, Amlwch, St Eilian's, Llaneilian, and St Tyfrodog, Llandyfrydog. The parish is within the deanery of Twrcelyn, the archdeaconry of Bangor and the Diocese of Bangor. As of 2012, the priest in charge is H. V. Jones.

== Architecture and fittings ==
=== Structure ===
The church, designed in the Gothic Revival style, is built from rubble masonry dressed with gritstone, and has a slate roof. There is a three-stage tower with buttresses at the base at the west end of the building, topped with a spire. The tower has one window in the west wall in the lowest stage, narrow windows on three sides in the middle stage, and pairs of windows topped with hoodmoulds around the tower in the section below the spire. The 18th-century bell comes from the old church.

St Gwenllwyfo's is entered through a porch on the south side near the west end; an internal doorway at the west end of the nave leads into the vestry in the tower. The nave has four bays (internal sections) and the chancel, to the east of the nave, has two. The chancel is separated from the nave by a decorated arch and a step, which raises it above the level of the nave. Within the chancel, the sanctuary is raised by a further three steps and marked by a rail.

The window on the north side of the church has a trefoil pattern at the top, and the hoodmould is decorated with faces. The south side of the building has a number of arched windows, singularly or in pairs, also with hoodmoulds. The arched east window has three lights (sections of window, separated by mullions) with trefoil patterns of tracery at the top. The east wall has a blocked doorway on the south side.

=== Stained glass ===
The stained-glass panels donated by Neave came from a monastery in Leuven, in the Flanders region of Belgium; much of the glass uses distinctive Flemish emblems. They had been purchased by his grandfather Sir Thomas Neave, 2nd Baronet from a Norwich-based German merchant, Hampp, who had trade links with Flanders. The 27 panels mainly date from around 1522, although the oldest glass is from the late 14th or early 15th century and there is some later glass from about 1600. Further pieces of glass were given by Neave to a church in Noak Hill, Essex (near Dagnam Park, from which came the title of Neave's baronetcy) and the houses of Dagnam Park and Llys Dulas. Other examples of the monastery's stained glass are held by the Metropolitan Museum of Art in New York, the Victoria and Albert Museum in London, and the Burrell Collection in Glasgow.

The east window has scenes from Christ's betrayal and crucifixion, the Adoration of the Magi and Christ's return from Egypt with his family. The top of the window uses glass fragments from a chapel commemorating Pope Adrian VI; he was tutor to Charles V, Holy Roman Emperor, whose head appears in the window, along with pictures of musical angels. Other windows in the nave and chancel contain saints or depictions of incidents in Christ's life (including one of Jesus wearing a straw hat after his resurrection, said to be "very rare").

=== Memorials and other fittings ===
A 1937 survey by the Royal Commission on Ancient and Historical Monuments in Wales and Monmouthshire noted a brass memorial plaque from 1609, erected by Richard Williams to his wife Marcelie Lloyd, daughter and co-heiress of David Lloyd of Llysdulas. The plaque, which was previously in the old church, bears three shields, one with the coat of arms of Williams, another with Marcelie Lloyd's arms, and the middle one with the two coats of arms combined. Below the shields, husband and wife are shown with their children (Anne, William and Griffith) kneeling in prayer on cushions. The survey also noted a plain silver cup, dated 1711–1712. Other items of communion plate (an inscribed silver chalice, a plain silver paten and a plain silver flagon) were donated by Gwyn Gertrude Hughes in 1866. The church furniture (including the octagonal wooden pulpit and the choir stalls) dates from the 19th century, although the octagonal font was reused from the old church.

The church has a number of other memorials from the 19th and 20th centuries, commemorating members of the various families associated with Llys Dulas (Neave, Hughes and Dinorben). The nave has three funerary hatchments (black diamond-shaped boards displaying the deceased's coat of arms) for Lord Dinorben, his wife Gertrude, and Sir Arundel Neave. A large slate tablet on the west wall of the nave records how much Gertrude and others contributed to the cost of the church. A model of the church made from matchsticks is kept within a glass case in the chancel.

== Assessment ==
St Gwenllwyfo's has national recognition and statutory protection from alteration as it has been designated as a Grade II* listed building – the second-highest of the three grades of listing, designating "particularly important buildings of more than special interest". It was given this status on 12 May 1970 and has been listed as "a mid 19th-century Gothic revival church closely associated with the Llys Dulas estate". Cadw (the Welsh Assembly Government body responsible for the built heritage of Wales and the inclusion of Welsh buildings on the statutory lists) also notes the church's "fine collection of 15th- and 16th-century Flemish stained glass panels", which it says is the "second largest such collection in the world", and the 17th-century brass plaque.

A 2006 guide to the churches of Anglesey describes the church as "impressively large", and comments that the "steeply-pitched slate roof" gives the interior "a sense of space". It also notes the "considerable amounts" of stained glass, which it describes as "impressive". It commented that it "contains a wealth of interesting items which are worth seeing."

A 2009 guide to the buildings of the region describes the building as "a Victorian estate church with its needle spire rising over trees", which it says is "disproportionately tall", and adds that it was "one of Kennedy's better works". It says that the glass is "outstanding".

== Notes ==
The cost of construction of the church can be inflated to contemporary values using changes in the British Gross Domestic Product (GDP). This measures the social cost of construction or investment as a proportion of the economy's total output of goods and services. This allows consideration of the equivalent social impact in current terms: how much contemporary Britons would need to forgo in order to invest a similar amount of the current British economy. As of 2012, the figures are updated using data from 2010, the latest year for which data is available.
