= Llaneuddog =

Coordinates: 53.367797°N 4.306206°W

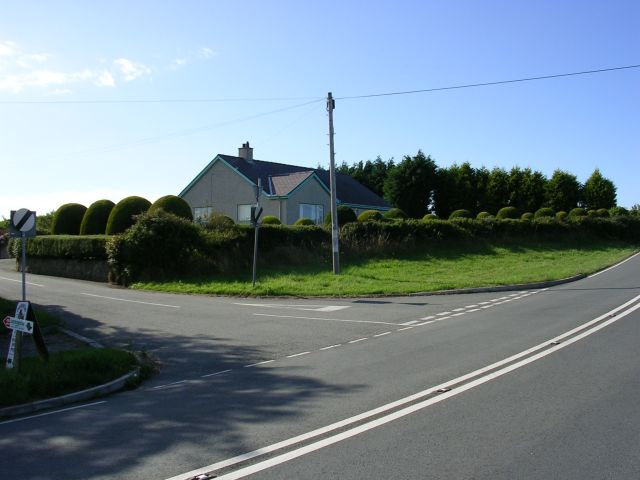

- Location within Anglesey
- OS grid reference: SH 4665 8814
  - Cardiff: 138.8 mi (223.4 km)
  - London: 217.8 mi (350.5 km)
- Community: Llaneilian
- Principal area: Anglesey
- Country: Wales
- Sovereign state: United Kingdom
- Post town: Dulas
- Police: North Wales
- Fire: North Wales
- Ambulance: Welsh
- UK Parliament: Ynys Môn
- Senedd Cymru – Welsh Parliament: Bangor Conwy Môn

Llaneuddog is a hamlet in the community of Llaneilian, Anglesey, Wales. It lies along the A5025 road, between Brynrefail and Penysarn, near Dulas. It belonged to the historical parish of Llanwenllwyfo, now part of Llaneilian. The hamlet takes its name from an ancient chapel to St Euddog which was in the vicinity of the A5025. It was recorded in 1920 as having the stones re-used in farm buildings, and the water stoup used as a pig trough at nearby Lligwy. The presumed site is a small enclosure with a crescent-shaped bank thought to be the churchyard boundary.

One of the prominent buildings near the Llaneuddog crossroads is Sardis Baptist Chapel. First built in 1834, it was rebuilt in 1905 at the height of the 1904–1905 Welsh revival.

The 1919 Memoirs of the Geological Survey of England & Wales suggests that in the early part of the 20th century there was a brickworks in the area.

== See also ==
- List of localities in Wales by population
Map of Llaneilian Community, showing Llaneuddog in the former parish of Llanwenllwyfo.
