= Mynydd Eilian =

Hill on Anglesey, Wales

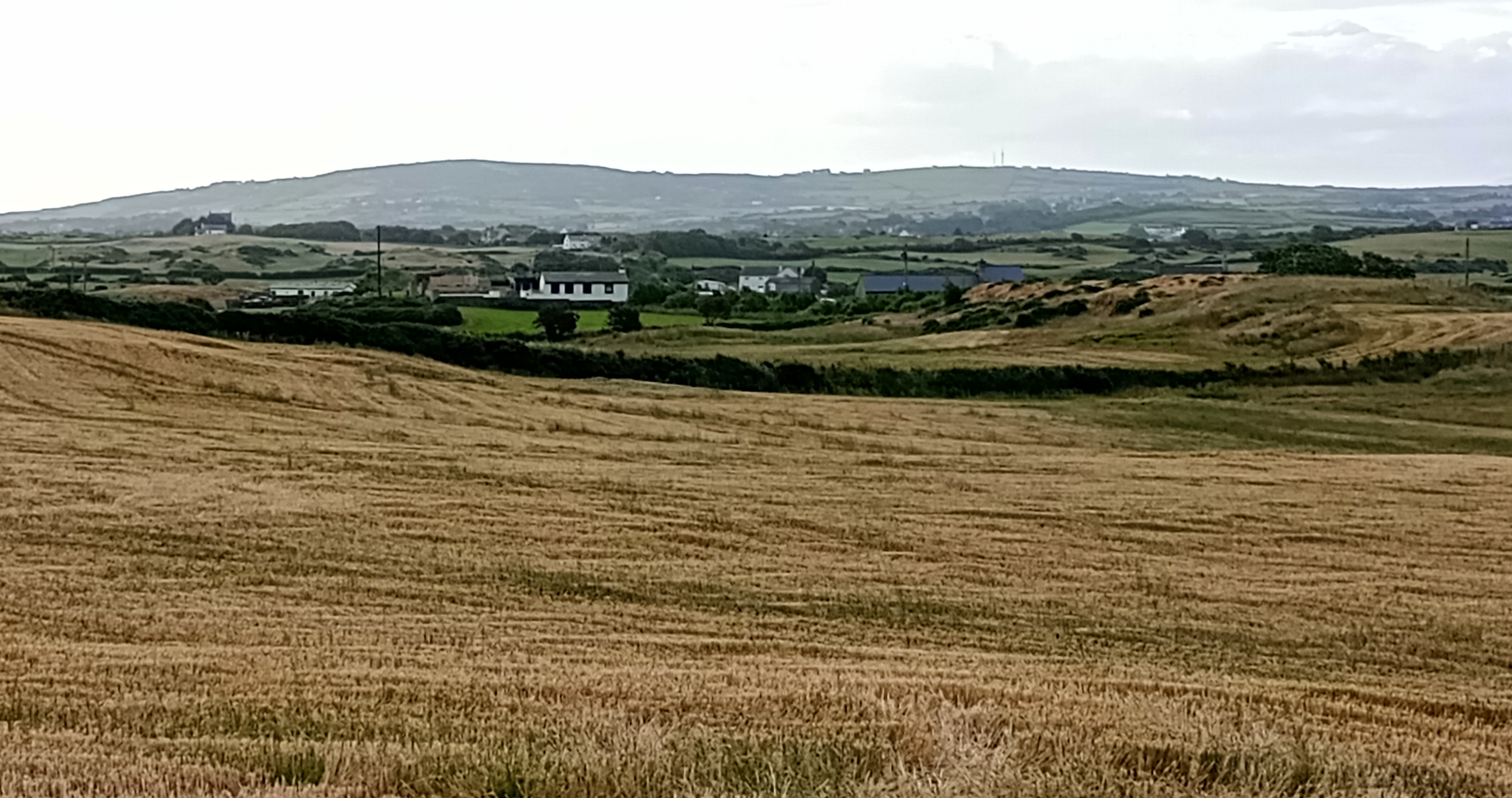

Highest point
- Elevation: 581 ft (177 m)
- Prominence: 404 ft (123 m)
- Parent peak: Mynydd Bodafon
- Listing: HuMPs
- Coordinates: 53.4002°N 4.2985°W

Naming
- English translation: Mountain of Saint Elian
- Language of name: Welsh

Geography
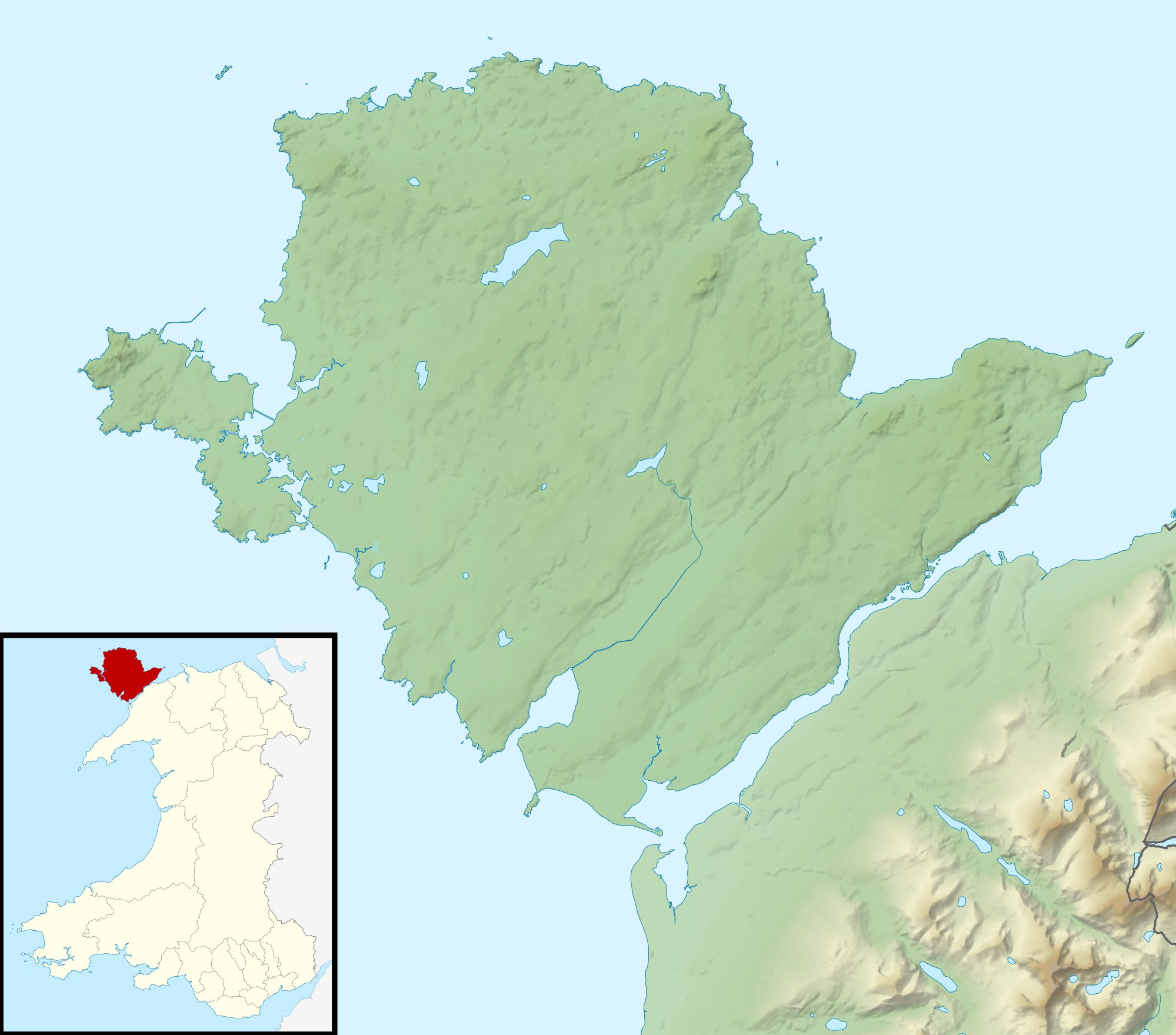
- Location within Anglesey
- Location: Anglesey, Wales
- OS grid: SH 47286 91724

Mynydd Eilian, sometimes also referred as Mynydd Llaneilian, is a hill in Anglesey, Wales.

== Etymology ==
The word Mynydd in Welsh stands for Mountain. Eilian refers to Saint Elian (Welsh: Sant Eilian), to whom are named several nearby places and buildings, like the village of Llaneilian and the Saint Eilian's Church.

== Physical geography ==
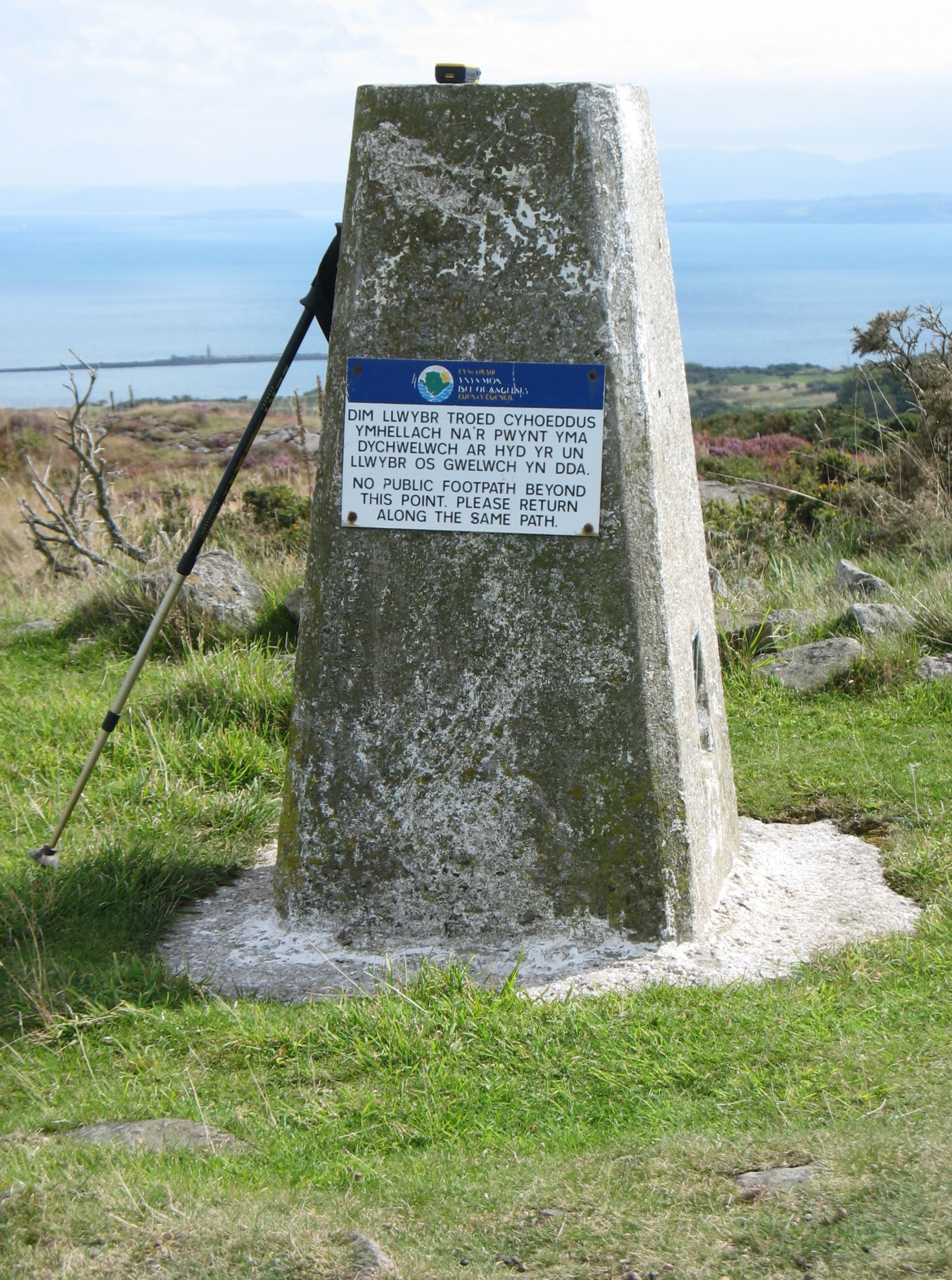
Trig point on the hilltop

Mynydd Eilian, after the Mynydd Bodafon, is the second-highest hill of the Isle of Anglesey. The hill is located close to the NE extremity of Anglesey, and overlooks Llaneilian and the Point Lynas (Welsh: Trwyn Eilian). Because of its topographic prominence is classified as a HuMP. With the Parys Mountain is a visual landmark of the nearby area. South of the Mynydd Eilian stands a lower hill named "Mynydd Nebo", where is located a couple of telecommunication masts.

== History ==
An archeologic site named Llys Caswallon, located some hundred metres E of the hilltop, was studied in the 2010s. Some clues lead to identify it as a prehistoric enclosure.

== Access to the summit ==
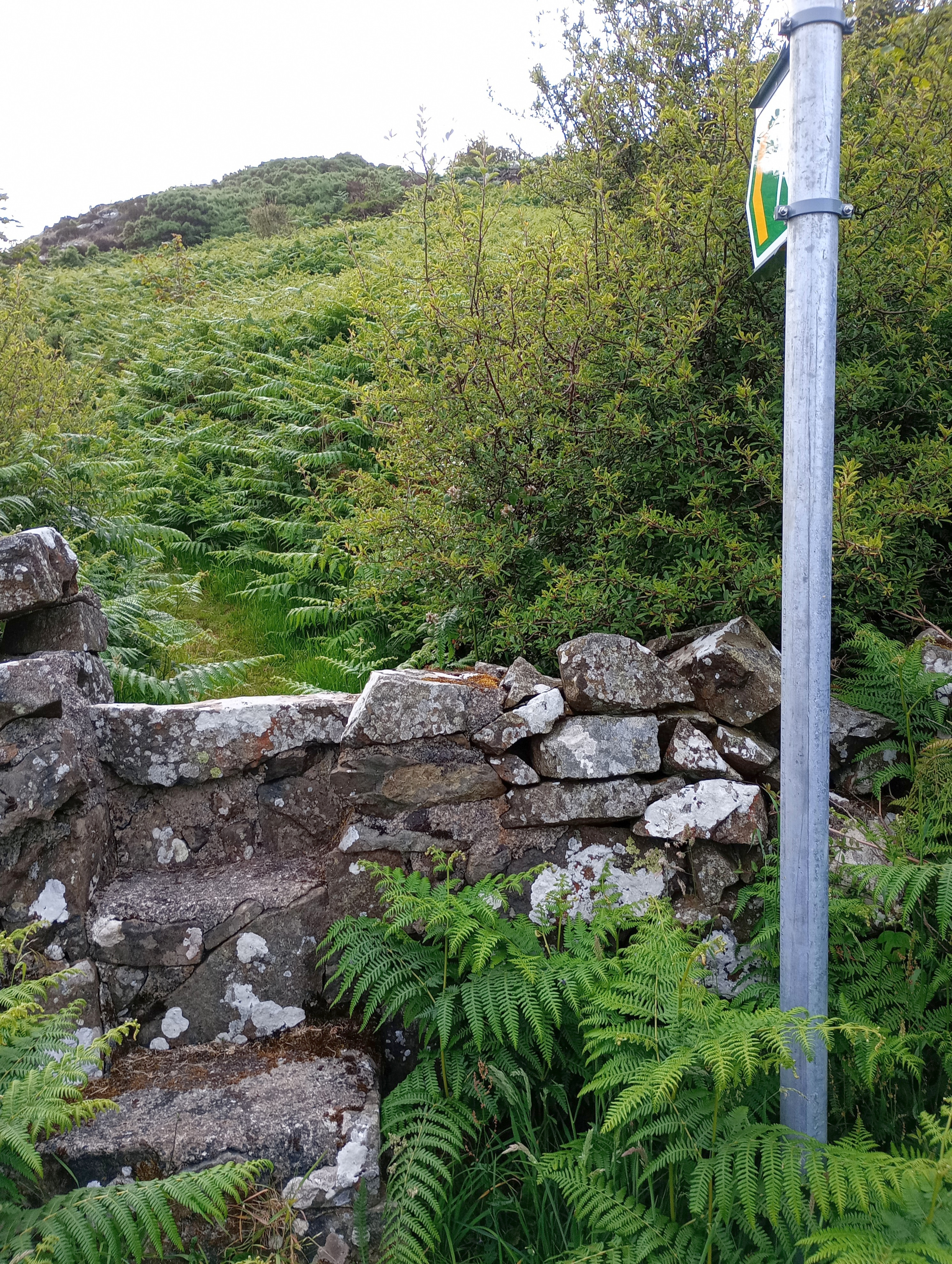
Footpath to the summit

The hill summit can be accessed from the village of Pengorffwysfa, at first by an asphalted lane and then following a public footpath.

== Conservation ==
Mynydd Eilian is part of the Anglesey AONB, and thus some activities or construction works can be restricted because of that. Around the hill was also extablished a RIGS named Mynydd Eilian RIGS Site, mainly to preserve some interesting outcrops of hornblende picrite outcrops. The rocks of the site date back to the Palaeozoic age.

== Panorama ==
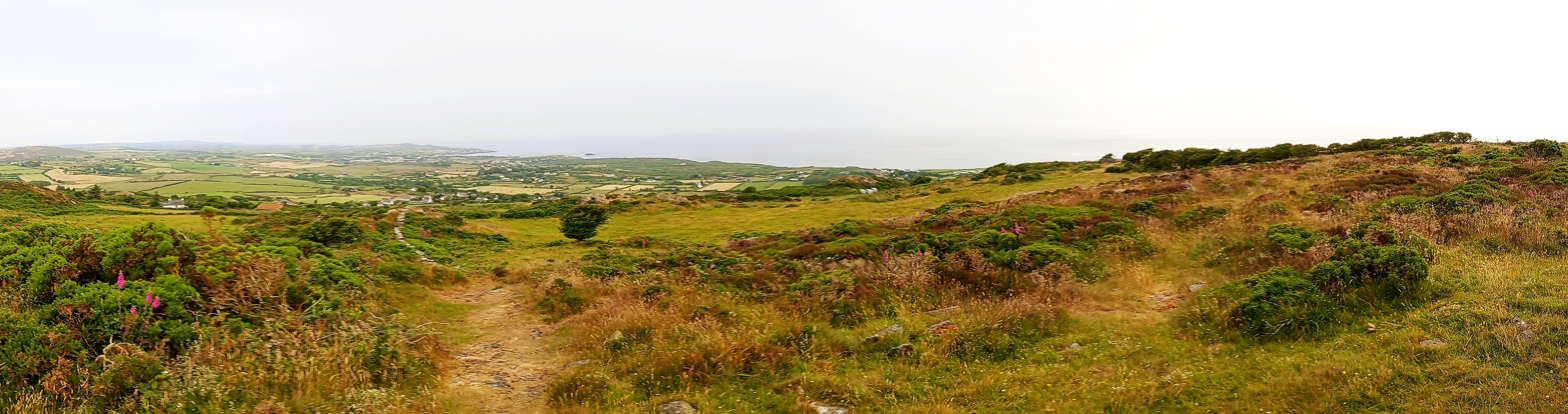
NE view from the hilltop

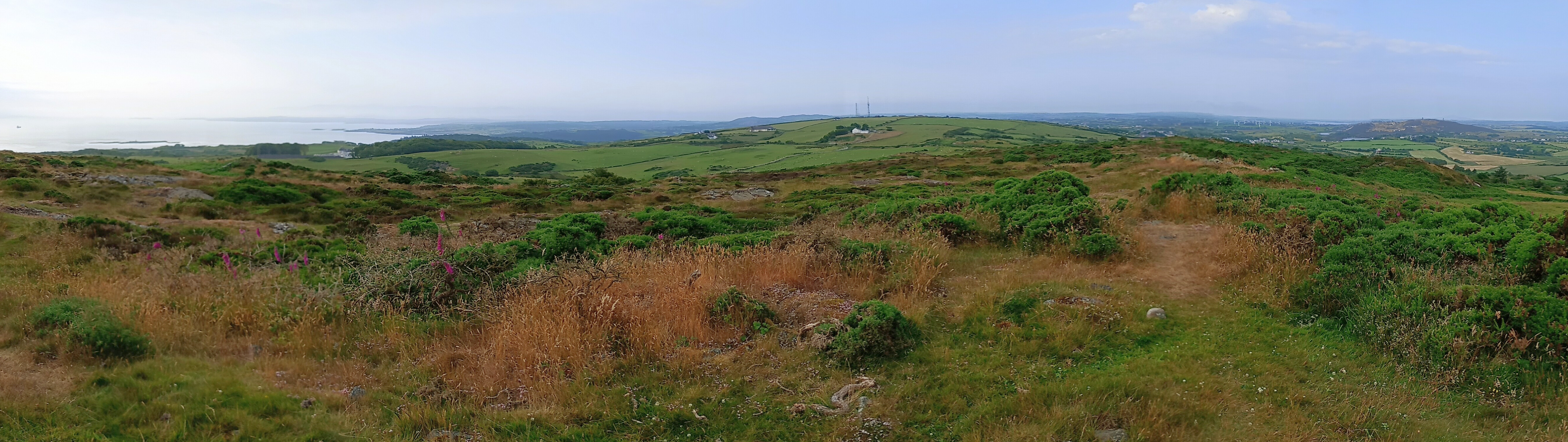
SW view from the hilltop
