= Cerrig Mân =

Village in Anglesey, Wales

Coordinates: 53.395°N 4.328°W

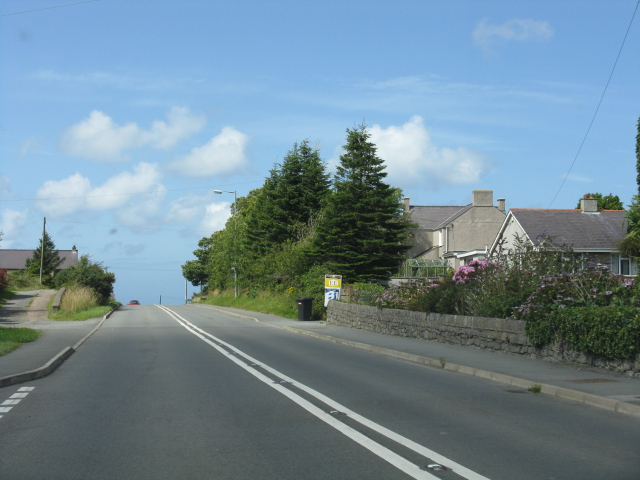

- Location within Anglesey
- OS grid reference: SH453911
- Principal area: Anglesey
- Preserved county: Gwynedd
- Country: Wales
- Sovereign state: United Kingdom
- Police: North Wales
- Fire: North Wales
- Ambulance: Welsh
- UK Parliament: Ynys Môn
- Senedd Cymru – Welsh Parliament: Ynys Môn

Cerrig Mân is a village in Anglesey, in north-west Wales, in the community of Llaneilian and the electoral ward of Twrcelyn. It lies just north of Penysarn and about a mile south-east of Amlwch, on both sides of the road which links those two places.
