= Old Church of St Gwenllwyfo, Llanwenllwyfo =

Coordinates: 53.385787°N 4.278499°W

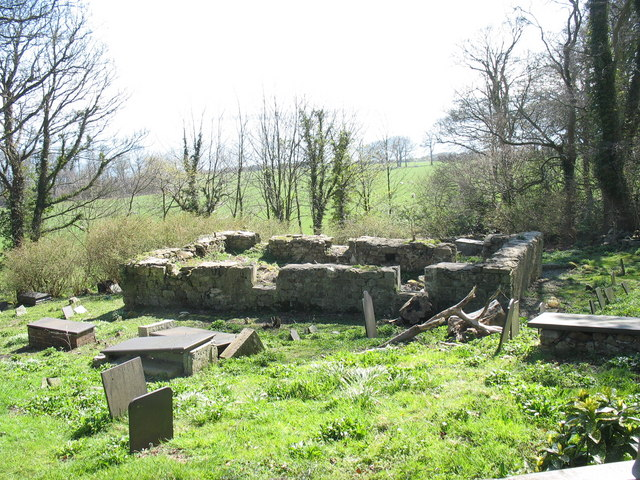
- The ruins of the church

- Location in Anglesey
- Location: Dulas, Anglesey
- Country: Wales
- Previous denomination: Church of England

History
- Status: Chapel of ease
- Dedication: Gwenllwyfo

Architecture
- Functional status: Ruins
- Architectural type: Church
- Closed: 1850s

Specifications
- Length: 39 ft 6 in (12.0 m)
- Width: 15 ft 9 in (4.8 m)

The Old Church of St Gwenllwyfo, Llanwenllwyfo is a medieval ruined church near Dulas, in Anglesey, Wales, perhaps built in the 15th century to replace another church from which only the 12th-century font survived. Dedicated to Gwenllwyfo, a 7th-century female saint about whom nothing else is known, it was used as a chapel of ease for the church in Amlwch, about 5 miles (8 km) away. Restored in 1610 and again in the 18th and 19th centuries, it contained an oak screen and pulpit from 1610.

It was replaced in the middle of the 19th century by a larger church about two-thirds of a mile (1.1 km) away, to which some of the contents, including a memorial brass plaque from the early 17th century and the church bell, were removed; other items were left behind. The disused church was noted to be in bad condition in 1937, and the roof collapsed in 1950. Little of the structure now remains, as the walls have been reduced to 5 feet (1.5 m) in height.

== History and location ==
The ruins of St Gwenllwyfo's Church stand near Dulas, in the north-east of Anglesey, Wales. The date of construction of the first church on the site is unknown. There was a church here in medieval times: one 19th-century writer suggested that the present building dates from the 15th century and that the font, probably 12th century in date, was the only surviving part of an earlier church on the site. Restoration work was carried out in about 1610 and in the 18th century; the latter changes eradicated the church's historical details.

The church (dedicated to Gwenllwyfo, a 7th-century woman about whom nothing else is known) was a chapel of ease attached to the parish of Amlwch, about 5 miles (8 km) away. The parish tithes, however, were divided between the Bishop of Bangor and the incumbent of St Eilian's Church, Llaneilian. The area takes its name from the church: the Welsh word llan originally meant "enclosure" and then "church", and "-wenllwyfo" is a modified form of the saint's name.

In 1812, the priest responsible for the church was Edward Hughes, whose wife was the niece of the owner of Llys Dulas, the landed estate in the area. He employed an architect to carry out some further restoration work, although the details are unknown. The church was in need of further repair by the middle of the 19th century, and the congregation needed a larger building. A new church was therefore built between 1854 and 1856 about two-thirds of a mile (1.1 km) away, financed largely by the widow of William Hughes, 1st Baron Dinorben (the son of Edward Hughes). The old church, which was allowed to fall into ruins, stands in a disused cemetery surrounded by trees.

== Architecture and fittings ==
The nave and chancel of the church were not structurally divided, and measure 39 feet 6 inches by 15 feet 9 inches (12 by 4.8 m). The walls are 3 feet (0.9 m) thick. In 1844, it was recorded as having a coved roof, doors in the north and south walls and windows in the east, north and west walls. It also had a pulpit and an oak screen, 7 feet (2.1 m) high, both dated 1610. The screen had inscriptions in Welsh and Latin, and a note that "Richard Williams of Rhodogeidio who married Marcelly Lloyd at his own charge caused all this worke to be don to the honor of God and his church". A brass plaque, erected in 1609 by Williams in memory of his wife, was moved to the new church. Another screen was later added at the west end to stop the wind blowing into the nave, and two windows were added on opposite sides of the chancel. Two box pews were installed during the 18th century, and a bell (now used by the new church) was added.

At the time of a survey by the Royal Commission on Ancient and Historical Monuments in Wales and Monmouthshire in 1937, although the building was in bad condition with an insecure roof, it still retained an 18th-century oak communion table, a rectangular font dating from the 12th century, the 1610 screen (damaged), the pulpit, fragments of an oak sounding board (also dated 1610) and some 18th-century memorials. There were also stone benches along the north and south walls, and some wooden benches from the 18th or early 19th century. The medieval roof trusses were also still in place in 1937, but the roof collapsed in 1950. The walls have since been lowered to a height of 5 feet (1.5 m).

== Assessment ==
The antiquarian Angharad Llwyd described the church in 1833 as "a small neat edifice, appropriately fitted up for the performance of divine service". Samuel Lewis, writing in the middle of the 19th century, said that the church was "a conspicuous and interesting object" in a parish that "partakes much of the general character of dreary sterility by which the mining districts in the immediate vicinity are distinguished". However, the clergyman and antiquarian Harry Longueville Jones, writing in 1859 about the church as it had been 15 years earlier, said that "the whole building was in bad repair". One writer described the church in the 1970s as "a roofless, forgotten shell".
