= Dulas Bay =

Bay in Anglesey, Wales

Coordinates: 53.37531°N 4.27132°W

Dulas Bay (Welsh: Bae Dulas) is a small bay on the north east coast of Anglesey, north Wales, forming the boundary between Llaneilian and Moelfre communities. The bay is bordered by three beaches.

== Overview ==
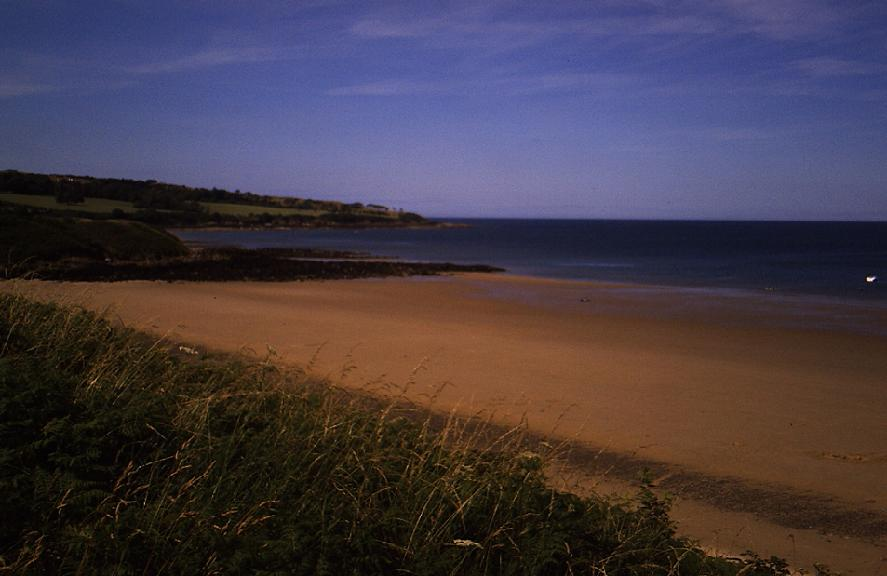
Traeth Yr Ora and, in the distance, Traeth Dulas

The north-western beach is the sand/shingle/mud estuary Traeth Dulas ('Dulas Beach'); southeast of this is the tiny Traeth Bach ('small beach') and the sandy Traeth yr Ora ('beach of the fortified landing place'). The estuary running through Traeth Dulas is that of Afon Goch ('red river'). Traeth Bach and Traeth yr Ora at high tide are separated by a rock outcrop called Craig y Sais ('the Saxon rock'). At low tide, however, it is possible to walk on the sand between the three beaches and also onto the beaches of Lligwy Bay to the south. Traeth Dulas is most affected by the tide, so much so that the most inland parts of the estuary are salt marshes. A walk is the circuit starting at Lligwy Bay, taking in Traeth yr Ora, the Pilot boat Pub and an option to reach the top of nearby Mynydd Bodafon.

About a mile and a half off shore is a small island, Ynys Dulas, which is roughly 620m long and has a maximum width of 205m. It is known for the seals which live on the island (hence it is also known locally as Seal Island), but it is too small for human habitation. However, upon this island is a round structure with a cone-shaped top that was built in 1821 by James Hughes to store food and provide shelter for shipwrecked seamen. Two much smaller islands, Garreg Allan ('the outer/expelled/furthest stone', not visible by the naked eye from the shore, behind Ynys Dulas) and Ynys y Carcharorion ('prisoners' island', nearer Traeth Dulas) are also present. Oil tankers can often be seen out some miles from shore in the Irish Sea, as they wait for the tide to enter the River Mersey for discharge at Tranmere Oil Terminal.

== Bathymetry and history ==
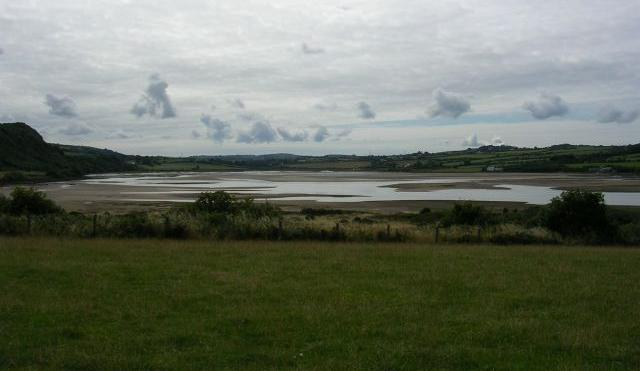
Traeth Dulas, the estuary of Afon Goch

The bathymetry of the bay is interesting. No water less than a mile out is over twenty metres deep. The most steep decline in the sea bed is found out from Traeth yr Ora. Conversely, a raised shelf of seabed about 1.5 km long reaches out just beyond Garreg Allen, none of which is over 5 metres deep. This is followed by a drop to much deeper water (over 20 metres deep), which indicates that Ynys Dulas may have been part of what is, geologically speaking, a recently submerged headland or perhaps a tombolo.

On the north side of Traeth Dulas stands Porto Bello, an interesting house built very much in the Mediterranean style. On top of the cliffs just south of Traeth yr Ora, overlooking the Irish Sea, is a concrete observation post left over from World War II. Slightly north of the bay is the village of Llysdulas. It was here that the manor house Llys Dulas (lit. 'Dulas manor or court') was located, and the families who owned the bay lived here. In ancient times this land belonged to the tribe of Llwyd, and passed through the Neave Baronets and Hughes families. Under the ownership of Lord Boston, however, the mansion fell into disuse and no longer exists. Some ruins of the chapel can still be found.

It is unclear whether the house and beach (both named Porto Bello) are connected. The area has historically been the location of shipwrecks, including those of the Island's famous "bone setters" in around 1745. According to local history, Porto Bello beach may also have been named after a shipwreck.

Perhaps the oldest known tradition regarding the bay dates from 1134. It is said that Owain Gwynedd, who became king of Gwynedd in 1137, had defeated a combined force of the Erse, Manx, and Norsemen near Llangwyllog in the centre of the island. The Welsh fleet turned on their enemy's ships and are said to have captured every last one of them in and around Dulas Bay.

== Location ==
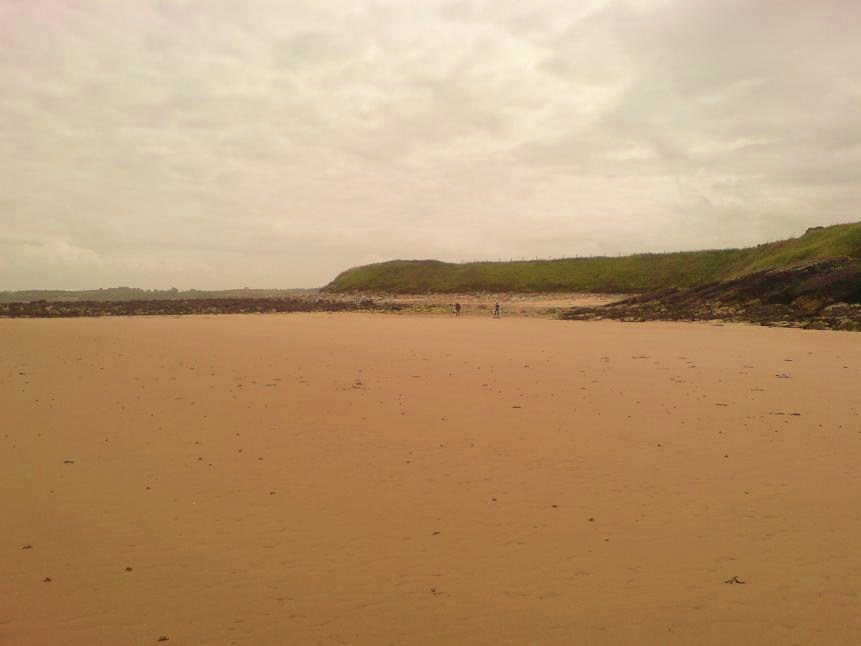
The southern section of Traeth yr Ora

The bay is on the Anglesey Coastal Path at grid reference SH490889 and has, with most of the rest of the coast of Anglesey, been designated as an Area of Outstanding Natural Beauty by the UK government. The geological makeup of the area is mostly Devonian Old Red Sandstone, although the north side of Traeth Dulas sees the limestone beds alternating with shale and gritstone. There are unusual levels of zinc and copper in the soil, and a water-table brought in by Afon Goch from the nearby Parys Mountain mines. However, the level is nowhere near high enough to be of danger to humans or animals. Just two and a half miles from the bay is Mynydd Bodafon, the highest point on the Anglesey mainland, reaching 178 metres above sea level.

The bay is reached by turning right off the A5025 at Brynrefail and although the three beaches are in the parish of Moelfre, Ynys Dulas is under the control of the Llaneilian community council. Other nearby villages include Moelfre, Benllech and Dulas. There are several good quality camp sites within a few minutes walk of the beaches.
