= Burwen =

Village in Anglesey, Wales

Coordinates: 53.412598°N 04.381333°W

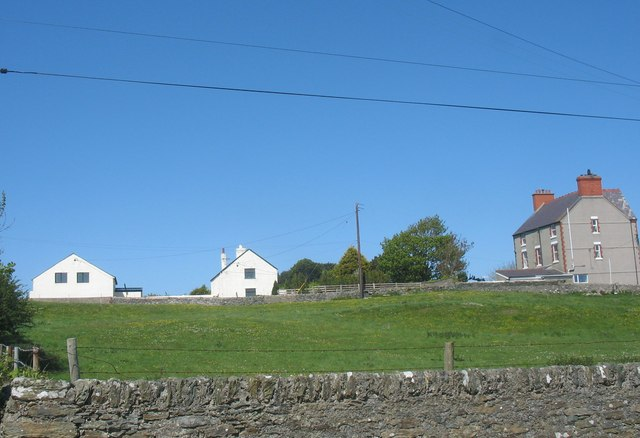
- Burwen

- Location within Anglesey
- OS grid reference: SH4193
- Principal area: Anglesey
- Country: Wales
- Sovereign state: United Kingdom
- Police: North Wales
- Fire: North Wales
- Ambulance: Welsh

Burwen is a village in Anglesey, Wales, in the community of Amlwch. Located on the A5025, it is southwest of Bull Bay and west of Amlwch.

Burwen contains the council cemetery of Amlwch, which was established in 1863.
