= Parys Mountain Windmill =

Building in Anglesey, Wales

Coordinates: 53°23′18″N 4°20′33″W

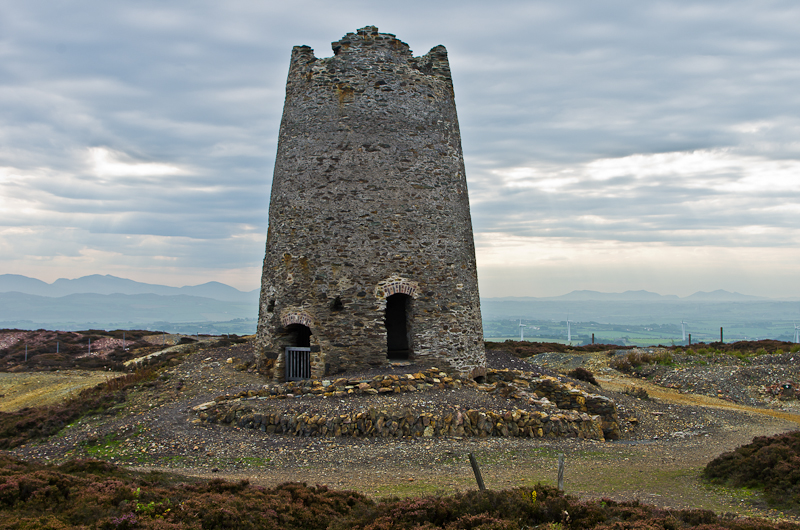

Parys Mountain Windmill is a Grade II listed building located on the highest point of Parys Mountain near Amlwch, Anglesey, Wales. The structure was built in 1878 to assist a local copper mine in the removal of water from mine shafts. It was the last tower mill built in Wales. The windmill remained in use until the mine's closure in 1904.

== History ==
The area around Parys Mountain has been mined for copper for several centuries. A substantial source of copper ore was discovered in 1768 and the site quickly developed into the world's largest copper mine. As the mine progressed, its shafts were sunk further into the ground and the need for the removal of water increased. This was initially done by hand and later by steam engine. In order to save money on the coal required to power the engines, the Parys Mountain Windmill was constructed in 1878, around 200 metres (660 ft) the mine, to replace the engines. The windmill was the last tower mill built in Wales. It was also used to remove ore from the shafts and lift machinery in and out for miners.

The windmill was unusual in that it featured five sails, the only windmill in Anglesey that was constructed in this way; typically windmills are built with four. It was also constructed with three doorways. The site remained in production for more than two decades before it eventually closed in 1904. The windmill fell into a state of disrepair and, by the end of the 1920, was described as a "capless shell".

== Geography ==
The Parys Mountain Windmill is located at the top of Parys Mountain and is visible for miles around. The structure was built at the mountain's highest point, 138 metres (453 ft) above sea level. The Royal Commission on the Ancient and Historical Monuments of Wales reports that a survey of the structure, undertaken in 1975, noted that it measured 10.8 metres (35 ft) high and featured a 2.3-metre (7 ft 7 in) deep cellar.
