= Gwenllwyfo =

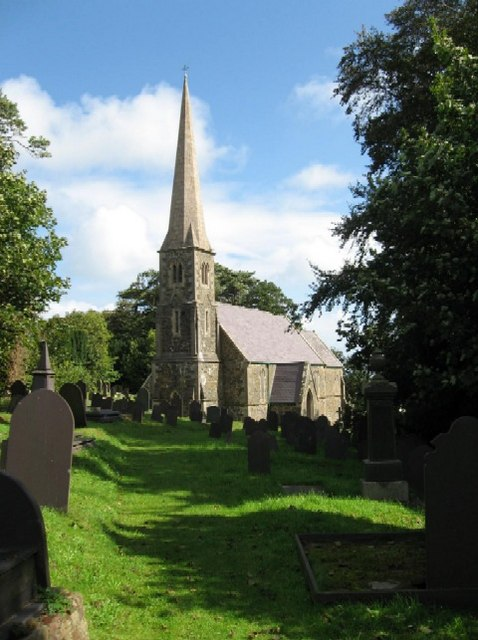
St Gwenllwyfo's Church, Llanwenllwyfo (built in 1856 to replace a medieval church also dedicated to St Gwenllwyfo)

Gwenllwyfo was a Christian woman recognised as a saint. She is commemorated in the dedication of two churches near Dulas, Anglesey, in Wales: St Gwenllwyfo's Church, Llanwenllwyfo (built 1856) and its medieval predecessor, the Old Church of St Gwenllwyfo, Llanwenllwyfo, which is now in ruins.

Few details about her are known. She is said to have lived in the seventh century. She is recorded in the Myvyrian Archaiology (a collection of medieval Welsh literature published in the early 19th century) as being the patroness of the church at Llanwenllwyfo without any further details of her life or family being given. Her feast day was recorded as being celebrated on 30 November. Gwenllwyfo is venerated as a saint, although she was never canonized by a pope: as the historian Jane Cartwright notes, "In Wales sanctity was locally conferred and none of the medieval Welsh saints appears to have been canonized by the Roman Catholic Church".
