= Nebo, Anglesey =

Hamlet in Wales

Coordinates: 53.38796°N 4.305297°W

Nebo
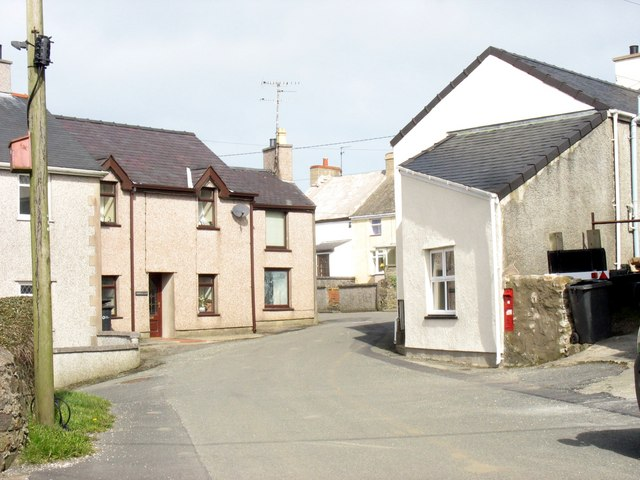
- Nebo Crossroads

- Location within Anglesey
- OS grid reference: SH 4678 9038
  - Cardiff: 140.1 mi (225.5 km)
  - London: 218.6 mi (351.8 km)
- Community: Llaneilian
- Principal area: Anglesey
- Country: Wales
- Sovereign state: United Kingdom
- Post town: Amlwch
- Police: North Wales
- Fire: North Wales
- Ambulance: Welsh
- UK Parliament: Ynys Môn
- Senedd Cymru – Welsh Parliament: Ynys Môn

Nebo is a hamlet in the community of Llaneilian, Anglesey, in north-west Wales. It is close to the town of Amlwch. The village is 1 mile (1.6 km) east of Penysarn, near the top of a hill known as Mynydd Nebo.

== Name and origins ==
An early arrival at what is now a small hamlet was Nebo Calvinistic Methodist Chapel, which was first established here in 1788. The chapel itself was named after Mount Nebo (now in Jordan), the mountain from which Moses is described as seeing the promised land. In 1823 the chapel was rebuilt, and the success of the chapel by the nineteenth century is shown by a religious survey of 1851. The parish of Llanwenllwyfo (now part of Llaneilian Community) was recorded as having 583 residents. The census lists two churches, of which the Anglican parish church recorded an attendance of 51, while Nebo chapel recorded the morning service of 328, afternoon 327, evening 615, indicating that the chapel was drawing in adherents from outside the parish, at a time when the Amlwch copper mining and related industries were employing large numbers of workers.

The chapel was renovated in 1878, but declined in the 20th century and closed in 1966. It has subsequently been converted into flats. The chapel had become a focus for a cluster of houses spreading along the four roads leading out of the hamlet, which collectively took the name of the chapel.

== Mynydd Nebo ==
The hamlet stands on the south-western end of a short ridge leading to the summit of Mynydd Nebo, a hill a little above 160 metres (520 ft), which has two radio masts. Maps show a third transmitter mast, which was taken down before 2008.

== See also ==
- List of localities in Wales by population
Map of Nebo, in Llaneilian Community.
