= Gadfa =

Coordinates: 53.383023°N 4.315814°W

- An access road that runs west from the A5025 to Penterfyn-Gadfa.

- Location within Anglesey
- OS grid reference: SH 4607 8985
  - Cardiff: 140 mi (230 km)
  - London: 218.8 mi (352.1 km)
- Community: Llaneilian
- Principal area: Anglesey
- Country: Wales
- Sovereign state: United Kingdom
- Post town: Penysarn
- Police: North Wales
- Fire: North Wales
- Ambulance: Welsh
- UK Parliament: Ynys Môn
- Senedd Cymru – Welsh Parliament: Ynys Môn

Gadfa is a hamlet in the community of Llaneilian, Anglesey, Wales. It is close to the town of Amlwch.

The dispersed settlement has a scatter of buildings mainly along and to the west of the A5025, with a smaller number on the eastern side of the road.

== See also ==
- List of localities in Wales by population
Map of Llaneilian Community, showing Gadfa and the surrounding area.
