= Point Lynas Lighthouse =

Lighthouse in Anglesey, Wales

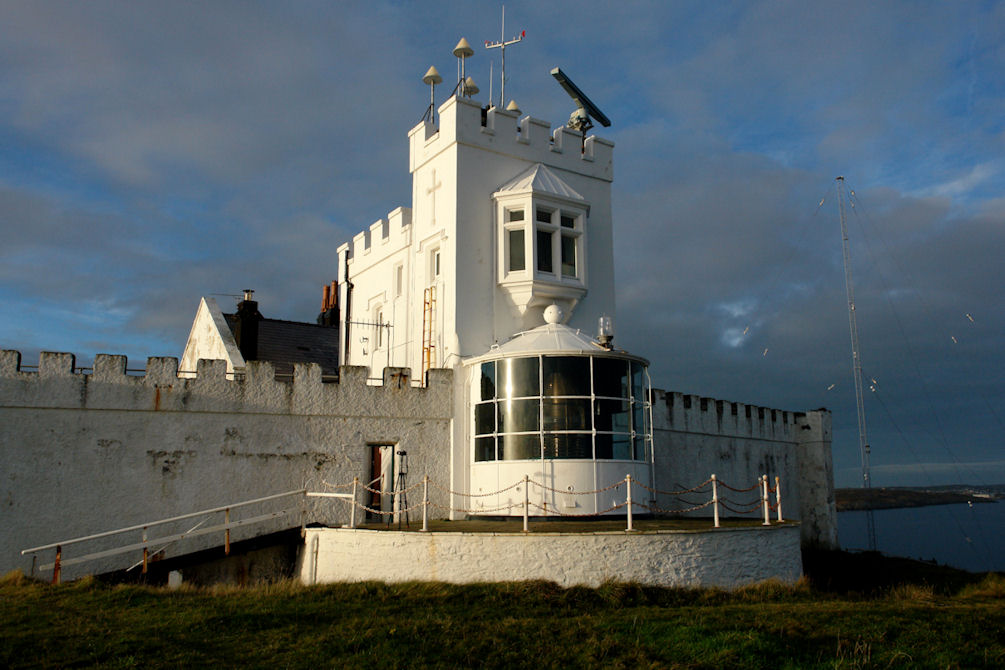
- The Lighthouse at Point Lynas
- Location: Llaneilian; Anglesey; Wales
- Coordinates: 53.416287°N 4.289198°W

Tower
- Constructed: 1766 (first)
- Automated: 1989
- Height: 11 metres (36 ft)
- Shape: lantern at ground level attached to a square castellated tower
- Markings: white tower and lantern
- Operator: Trinity House
- Heritage: Grade II listed building
- Fog signal: blast every 45s. (ceased operation in 2012)

Light
- First lit: 1835 (current)
- Focal height: 39 metres (128 ft)
- Lens: 2nd Order catadioptric fixed
- Intensity: 89,900 candela
- Range: 18 nautical miles (33 km; 21 mi)
- Characteristic: Oc W 10s.

Point Lynas Lighthouse (Welsh: Goleudy Trwyn y Balog) is located on a headland in Llaneilian Community, on the north-east corner of Anglesey in North Wales (at grid reference SH479936). A pilot station was established on the point in 1766, to guide ships entering and leaving Liverpool, with an associated lighthouse added in 1779. The present building was built on the hilltop in 1835, so does not need a tower. Built and managed by the Mersey Docks and Harbour Board, it did not come under the care of Trinity House until 1973. By 2001 the lights were fully automated, so no resident staff were needed. Whilst the light is retained in operational use, the building and associated lighthouse keepers cottages were returned to the Mersey Docks and Harbour Board who sold them to be a private home and holiday accommodation.

== History ==
This unusual and distinctive lighthouse was designed by Jesse Hartley, engineer to the Mersey Docks and Harbour Board from 1824 to 1860, but with additions by G Lyster some twenty years later.

It is a castellated building comprising a two-storey dwelling surmounted by a square tower 11 metres (36 ft) high. The semicircular lantern is located at the base. The present lantern is 4.6 metres (15 ft) in diameter and dates from about 1874. The lantern has a cast-iron lower wall and rectangular glazing bars take the height to 3.7 metres (12 ft). The lantern is topped by a plain conical roof with a ball finial. The square tower above has a corbelled oriel window of the pilot's look-out.

Map of Point Lynas, showing the location of the lighthouse.

== Original location ==
Point Lynas was first lit in 1779 at a site about 300 metres (980 ft) south of the present tower, to provide accommodation for Liverpool pilots making use of the shelter at Porthyrysgaw. The site was abandoned for the present position, so that a light could be positioned on the more important north-eastern position, where a tower is not required, as the light sits 39 metres (128 ft) above mean high water.

== The lantern ==
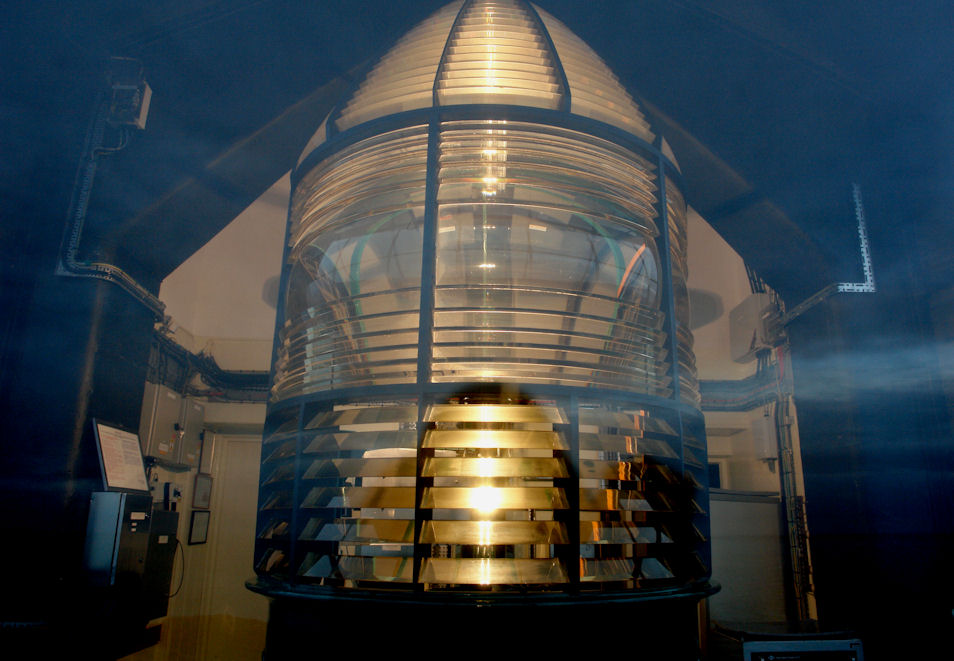
Detail of the optic lens

The unusual arrangement of having the lantern at ground level with the look-out and telegraph room above is similar to the Great Orme Lighthouse, also built by the Mersey Docks and Harbour Board. The telegraph station was established in 1879, and two new cottages were erected to accommodate extra staff. Point Lynas has now been taken over by Trinity House.

A Chance Brothers occulting optic was fitted in the light room in 1878. This is 1.4 metres (4 ft 7 in) in diameter and displays a light through 206 degrees. The fixed part of the optic consists of three sections, the central unit on the focal plane has a 0.25 metres (9.8 in) deep curved lens with bands of six prisms above and below it. The bottom unit is made up of six bands of reflective prisms, while the inclined top unit contains sixteen.

The lamp has an intensity of 89,900 candela and is white, occulting every 10 seconds. It has a range of 18 nautical miles (33 km; 21 mi).

== Electrification and automation ==
In 1952 the station was electrified and the mechanical elements of the original light-shutter were removed. In 1948 an automatic acetylene fog-gun was installed, but was removed in 1973, when the light was transferred to Trinity House, who fitted electrical emitters. The light was automated in 1989 and is now controlled from the Trinity House Planning Centre in Harwich, Essex. As a result, the lighthouse keepers' cottages reverted to Mersey Docks and Harbour Company, who subsequently sold it to be a private family home, with the lighthouse keepers' cottages turned into holiday lets.

== Historical importance ==
The lighthouse is considered to be important for its association with Jesse Hartley (1780–1860), the engineer responsible for the world's first great floating dock system at Liverpool

== See also ==
- List of lighthouses in Wales

== Sources ==
- Hague, D., B., The Lighthouses of Wales Their Architecture and Archaeology (The Royal Commission on the Ancient and Historical Monuments of Wales, Edited by Hughes, S., 1994) ISBN 1-871184-08-8
