= A5025 road =

Road in Anglesey, Wales

A5025

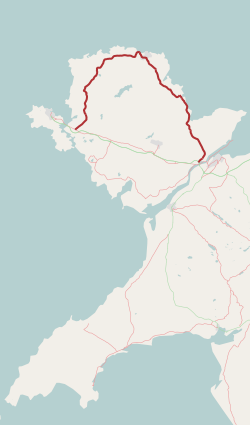

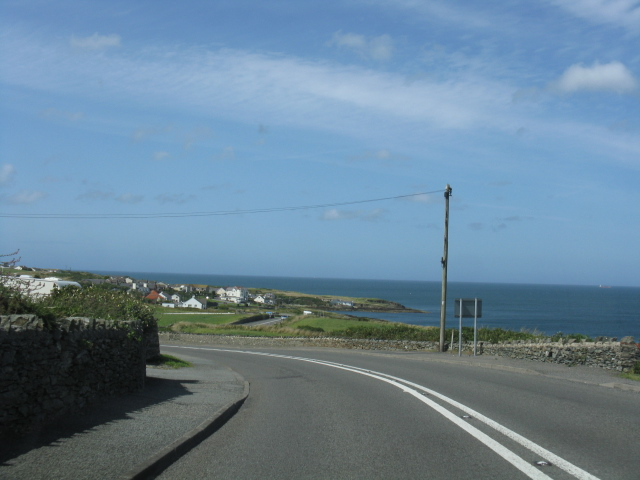

Route information
- Length: 33.1 mi (53.3 km)

Major junctions
- From: Llanfairpwllgwyngyll; 53.2247°N 4.1909°W
- A5, A55
- To: Valley; 53.2829°N 4.5597°W

Location
- Country: United Kingdom
- Constituent country: Wales

Road network
- Roads in the United Kingdom; Motorways; A and B road zones

The A5025 is an 'A' road that runs from Llanfairpwllgwyngyll to Valley in Anglesey, Wales. A major road around the north coast of the isle, it runs up the east, north and finally north-west side of the island via several places including Benllech and Amlwch. In all the road is 33.1 miles (53.3 km) long.

== Description ==
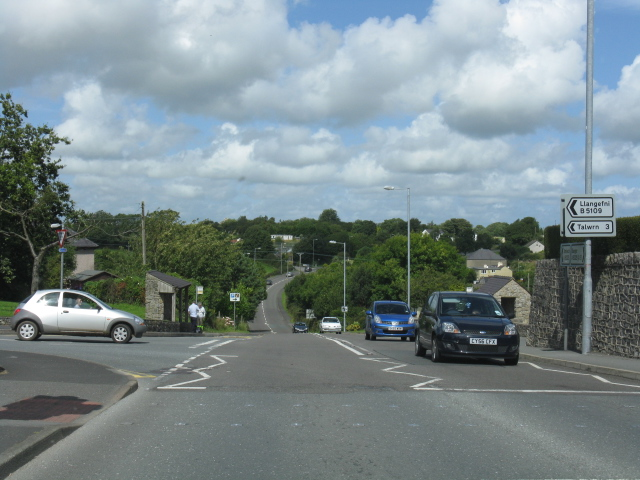
The A5025 at Pentraeth

The A5025 begins at the A55 road, near Sant Tysilio Nursing Home on the northeastern outskirts of Llanfairpwllgwyngyll. It initially heads northeast but soon teeters northwest as its passes Pentraeth Motors. It continues northwest, passing through the town of Pentraeth itself, where it crosses the B5109 road, and then heads north through the coastal town of Benllech. The stretch of road in Benllech is known as Bangor Road. It heads northwest again, crossing the B5110 road, before briefly turning southwest at the junction with the A5108 road to the northeast of Llanallgo. After passing through Llanallgo it heads north-northwest through Brynrefail, Llaneuddog, and Penysarn. Northwest of here it meets the B5111 road in the centre of the town of Amlwch, near the north coast of Anglesey.

At Bull Bay, north of the centre of Amlwych, it turns southwest briefly before heading west at Burwen, where it again joins the B5111. It then heads west for a few miles to thecoastal town of Cemaes, passing through its southern outskirts before heading southwest to Tregele, Llanrhyddlad, and Llanfaethlu. Near Llanfaethlu is briefly turns southeast and then south to Llanfachraeth and Llanynghenedl, before finally heading southwest to the town of Valley, near the Cymyran Strait, where it joins the A5.

== History ==
The Daily Post has referred to the A5025 as "one of the deadliest roads in North Wales". The 10-mile (16 km) stretch between Cemaes on the coast and Llanynghenedl in particular has a notorious reputation on the isle for accidents, claiming three lives in just nine months in the late 2000s. Just before Christmas 2002 a 12-year-old school girl was killed in a car accident near Dulas. The speed limit of the road varies between 30 and 60 mph (50 and 95 km/h), but locals have criticised the 40 mph (65 km/h) limit in several of the areas. In July 2015 it was announced that several alterations would be made to the road and improvements carried out in anticipation of the (now cancelled) building of a new £8 billion nuclear plant at Wylfa, near Cemaes.
