= Anglesey Mining =

United Kingdom based mining company

Anglesey Mining plc
- Formerly: Peakneat Limited (September–November 1984)
- Traded as: LSE: AYM
- Founder: Imperial Metals Corporation (Canada)
- Headquarters: United Kingdom
- Products: Mining
- Website: angleseymining.co.uk

Anglesey Mining plc is a United Kingdom-based mineral exploration and development company focused on the Parys Mountain (Mynydd Parys) copper-zinc-lead-silver-gold project on the Isle of Anglesey in North Wales. The company owns 100% of the project and is listed on the Alternative Investment Market of the London Stock Exchange under the ticker AYM.

During the financial year ended 31 March 2026, Anglesey Mining disposed of its interests in the Grängesberg iron ore project in Sweden and Labrador Iron Mines Holdings Limited in Canada. The disposals formed part of a restructuring which left Parys Mountain as the company's principal and sole mineral development asset.

Andrew Fulton, a Chartered Mining Engineer, was appointed Chief Executive Officer with effect from 1 June 2026, succeeding Rob Marsden. Jim Williams serves as Executive Chairman. Martin Wood, Taj Singh and Brendan Cahill serve as Non-Executive Directors.

Brendan Cahill also serves as President of Energold Minerals Inc., the company’s largest shareholder.

== Company history ==
Anglesey Mining was established in the 1980s to develop the Parys Mountain mineral deposit. Planning permission for mining at Parys Mountain was granted in 1988, and the company subsequently became publicly listed.

During the late 1980s and early 1990s, the company undertook substantial underground exploration and development at Parys Mountain. This included sinking the Morris Shaft to approximately 300 metres, developing underground workings and extracting approximately 2,000 tonnes of mineralised material for metallurgical testing and pilot-plant processing.

Development was suspended in the early 1990s against the background of weak base-metal prices. Exploration, geological modelling and technical studies subsequently continued at the project.

In January 2021, independent mining consultancy Micon International completed a Preliminary Economic Assessment (PEA) for Parys Mountain. The study examined several potential development configurations, including an underground operation initially producing approximately 1,500 tonnes per day and a larger development incorporating the Northern Copper Zone at up to 3,000 tonnes per day.

In 2022 and 2023, further drilling and geological modelling were undertaken in the White Rock and Engine zones. An updated Mineral Resource Estimate was published in April 2023.

Following a corporate and balance-sheet restructuring during 2025 and 2026, Anglesey Mining disposed of its non-core overseas investments and refocused the company on the development and exploration of Parys Mountain.

== Parys Mountain ==
Parys Mountain (Welsh: Mynydd Parys) lies near Amlwch on the Isle of Anglesey in North Wales. The mountain has a long history of mining and was an internationally important source of copper during the eighteenth century.

The modern project is a polymetallic volcanogenic massive sulphide (VMS) deposit containing copper, zinc and lead, together with silver and gold. Mineralisation extends across a number of identified zones within the wider Parys Mountain mineral system.

Anglesey Mining holds the base-metal mining rights at Parys Mountain through its wholly owned subsidiaries and owns or leases the land covering the principal mineralised areas.

== Mineral resources ==
The current JORC-compliant Mineral Resource Estimate, reported in April 2023, comprises approximately 16.1 million tonnes grading 1.0% copper, 1.3% zinc, 0.7% lead, 15 g/t silver and 0.2 g/t gold, equivalent to approximately 1.9% copper equivalent.

The resource contains approximately 158,000 tonnes of copper, 213,000 tonnes of zinc and 115,000 tonnes of lead, together with approximately 7.9 million ounces of silver and 86,000 ounces of gold.

The principal resource areas are:

White Rock Zone - a predominantly zinc-lead-silver mineralised zone forming a significant part of the more extensively drilled western resource.

Engine Zone - a polymetallic copper-zinc-lead-silver-gold zone adjacent to White Rock.

Northern Copper Zone - a larger copper-dominant zone containing an Inferred Mineral Resource of approximately 9.4 million tonnes grading 1.27% copper. It remains open to further geological evaluation and is a principal target for future resource-definition drilling.

Deep Engine Zone - deeper copper-zinc-lead mineralisation below the western resource area.

Garth Daniel Zone - polymetallic mineralisation east of the Engine Zone.

The 2023 resource update concentrated on White Rock and Engine, and introduced Measured Resources at Parys Mountain for the first time. Together, White Rock and Engine contain approximately 5.72 million tonnes, of which approximately 5.3 million tonnes are classified as Measured and Indicated.

The Northern Copper, Deep Engine and Garth Daniel resource estimates were not updated as part of the 2023 exercise and consequently remain based on the earlier resource modelling.

== Geology ==
Parys Mountain is interpreted as a volcanogenic massive sulphide deposit associated with ancient submarine volcanic activity. The mineralisation occurs principally within and around rhyolitic volcanic rocks and shales and extends across a mineralised system approximately three kilometres in length.

The deposit contains both massive sulphide and copper-rich stockwork mineralisation. Principal sulphide minerals include chalcopyrite, sphalerite, galena and pyrite.

Historical and modern drilling has identified mineralisation both within and beyond the currently defined Mineral Resource and several parts of the wider mineral system remain comparatively lightly explored.

== Mine development studies ==
The January 2021 PEA examined underground mining of the Parys Mountain deposit using mechanised mining methods.

The study's initial underground development case focused on White Rock and Engine at a nominal production rate of 1,500 tonnes per day. A larger development case incorporated the Northern Copper, Deep Engine and Garth Daniel zones and considered production of up to 3,000 tonnes per day, together with refurbishment and use of the existing Morris Shaft.

The PEA considered on-site processing using conventional crushing, grinding and differential flotation to produce separate copper, lead and zinc concentrates, together with gravity recovery of gold.

The study was a preliminary economic assessment and included Inferred Mineral Resources. It did not establish an Ore Reserve or constitute a feasibility study.

Since the PEA, Anglesey Mining has continued geological, metallurgical, environmental and engineering work intended to improve the technical definition of the project and support future mine planning and permitting.

== Current development and exploration ==
From 2026, Anglesey Mining's activities have been focused exclusively on Parys Mountain.

The company's current technical programme includes consolidation and digitisation of historical geological information, three-dimensional geological modelling, further evaluation of the Northern Copper Zone, metallurgical and mine-planning studies and assessment of additional exploration targets across the wider Parys Mountain mineral system.

The company describes this programme under three broad areas: development of the initial mine, expansion and increased confidence in the known Mineral Resource, and exploration of the wider mineralised district.

Environmental assessment, planning and permitting work is also being progressed as part of the proposed redevelopment of the site.

== Corporate restructuring ==
During the financial year ended 31 March 2026, Anglesey Mining undertook a restructuring of its balance sheet and investment portfolio. Approximately £3.6 million of principal debt was eliminated and the company's interests in the Grängesberg iron ore project in Sweden and Labrador Iron Mines Holdings Limited in Canada were disposed of.

The restructuring resulted in Anglesey Mining becoming a company focused solely on Parys Mountain.

In June 2026, Andrew Fulton joined as Chief Executive Officer, Jim Williams became Executive Chairman, and Martin Wood and Taj Singh joined as Non-Executive Directors alongside Brendan Cahill.
