= City, Vale of Glamorgan =

Village in the Vale of Glamorgan, Wales

Coordinates: 51.495°N 3.46°W

City is a small hamlet in the Vale of Glamorgan, Wales, United Kingdom. It is part of the slightly larger parish of Llansannor, which is also a hamlet.

== Location ==
It is close to the town of Cowbridge and the village of Llanharry.

== Origin of the name ==
The hamlet has never held the status of a city and "City" is not a recognisable Welsh word, so its origin is unclear. There is local speculation that the name came from an Anglicisation of Saith Tŷ, which is Welsh for "Seven Houses".

There is another place in Wales called City, in Montgomeryshire, as well as City Dulas in Anglesey.

== Amenities ==
The hamlet has no shops. It once had a pub called the City Inn, but it has now closed down and been replaced with residential properties. It contains a village hall called Llansannor Community Hall, which is shared with the neighbouring hamlet of Llansannor and the surrounding local area.
