= City, Powys =

Coordinates: 52.5017°N 3.1639°W

City
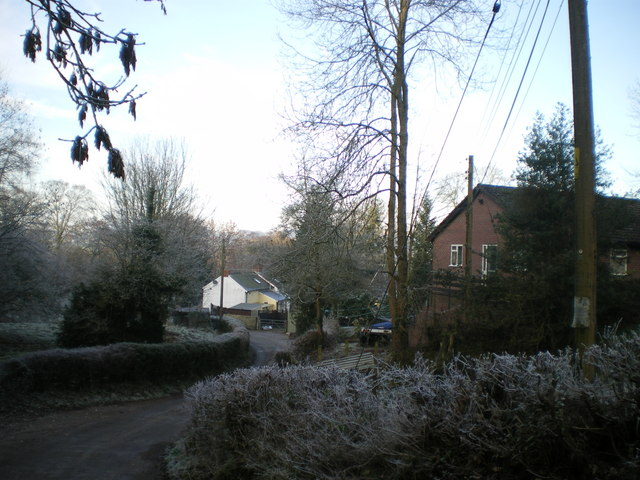

- Location within Powys
- OS grid reference: SO210899
- Principal area: Powys
- Preserved county: Powys
- Country: Wales
- Sovereign state: United Kingdom
- Post town: NEWTOWN
- Postcode district: SY16
- Dialling code: 01686
- Police: Dyfed-Powys
- Fire: Mid and West Wales
- Ambulance: Welsh
- UK Parliament: Montgomeryshire and Glyndŵr
- Senedd Cymru – Welsh Parliament: Montgomeryshire

City is a hamlet in Powys, Wales.

== Geography ==
City is 0.75 miles (1.21 km) from the small village of Sarn (which is situated on the A489 road) and is on the slopes up to the Clun Forest and the English border, which is only 1.2 miles (1.9 km) to the southeast. The hamlet is situated in a small valley, at an elevation of between 210 and 230 metres (690 and 750 ft) above sea level.

City is just off the minor road that leads from Sarn up to the Kerry Ridgeway and further to Bishop's Castle, a market town 7.5 miles (12.1 km) distant, in Shropshire. The two nearer towns however are historic Montgomery — 5.2 miles (8.4 km) away — and (the larger) Newtown, which is 7.1 miles (11.4 km) to the west.

At present, 11 dwellings comprise the core of the hamlet (though one is dilapidated) as well as three outlying isolated houses. There are a number of small, disused quarries in the area. Today the landscape is a mixture of woodland and pasture. The local economy is largely based on agriculture and forestry.

There is a Royal Mail post box with a daily collection Monday-Saturday, and the hamlet's postcode is SY16 4HH.

=== Bachaethlon ===
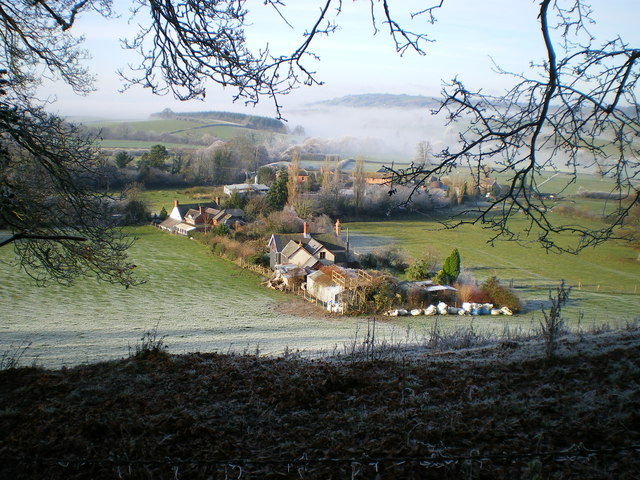
The farming settlement of Bachaethlon, looking towards the northwest.

A separate and historic settlement called Bachaethlon lies just to the north of City, on the other side of the Sarn-Bishop's Castle road. Bachaethlon lies on more level ground, at an elevation of 200 metres (660 ft). It consists of 6 dwellings and many agricultural buildings. Anglicised spellings include "Bahaithlon" and "Bahaillon".

=== Governance ===
The area forms part of the Kerry community (in the ward of Sarn) and for Powys County Council the electoral division/ward of Kerry. It falls in the historic county of Montgomeryshire.

== Origin of the name ==
The hamlet has never held the status of a city and "City" is not a recognisable Welsh word, so its origin is unclear. It is possible that the name came from an Anglicisation of Saith Tŷ, which is Welsh for "Seven Houses".

There is another place in Wales called City, in the Vale of Glamorgan, as well as City Dulas in Anglesey.
