= Ynys Dulas =

Island off Anglesey, Wales

Coordinates: 53°23′N 4°15′W

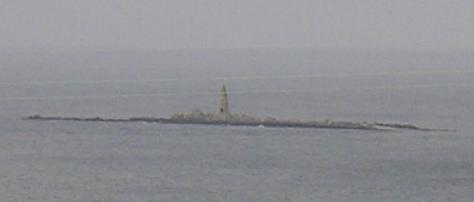
Ynys Dulas viewed from the shoreline

Ynys Dulas (Welsh for 'Dulas Island') is a small island located off the north-east coast of Anglesey (Welsh: Ynys Môn), Wales. It marks the most eastern part of the parish of Llaneilian.

The island is situated about a mile and a half offshore, within Dulas Bay. The size of the island depends on the tide, with a maximum length of 623 metres and width of 207 metres against a minimum of 184 metres by 35 metres. It has a maximum area of 18.3 acres (74,000 m^{2}). The island is mainly rocky, but at low tide sand is exposed, most noticeably on the southern part of the island where it separates the main rock formation from two smaller ones named Garnog ('Hooves'). Seals are often spotted living on and around the island, but it is too small for human inhabitation. There is also very little flora on the island owing to its rocky composition. However, on lower lying parts of the island, exposed at low tide, seaweeds and other sea plants live. A smaller rock called Garreg Allan ('The Outer, Expelled or Furthest Stone') is found about 100 m behind the island, but is not visible with the naked eye from the shore.

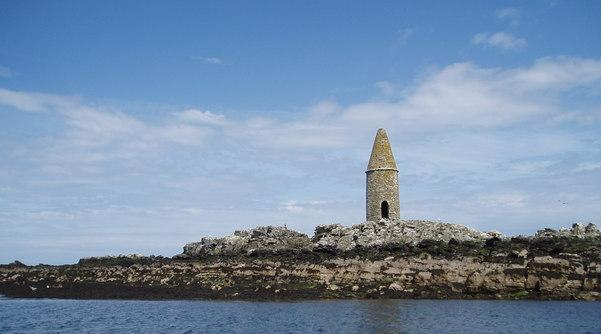
Ynys Dulas up close

A raised shelf of seabed about 1.5 km long reaches out a little beyond Garreg Allan, meaning that the sea around it is no more than 5 metres deep. This is followed by a drop to water much deeper (over 20 metres deep), which indicates that Ynys Dulas may have been part of a recently (geologically speaking) submerged headland. The island also marks the termination of an old limestone headland which geologically separated Dulas Bay from Lligwy Bay and Red Wharf Bay.

The island has a rescue tower that once stored food and provided shelter for shipwrecked seamen. The cylindrical, stone-cone-shaped structure was completed in 1824 by Colonel James Hughes of Llys Dulas Manor. A map drawn up in September 1748 by Lewis Morris shows the island named as Ynys Gadarn (Strong or Mighty Island) not Ynys Dulas.

== Sinking of Mary Ann ==
On 16 November 1928 Mary Ann, a 138 GRT wooden brigantine built in 1879 by Kingston of Moray, registered in Guernsey and owned by George H Grounds of Runcorn, was sailing from Runcorn to Falmouth with a cargo of coal, when it was stranded on Ynys Dulas.
