= Sarn, Powys =

Coordinates: 52.51°N 3.174°W

Sarn
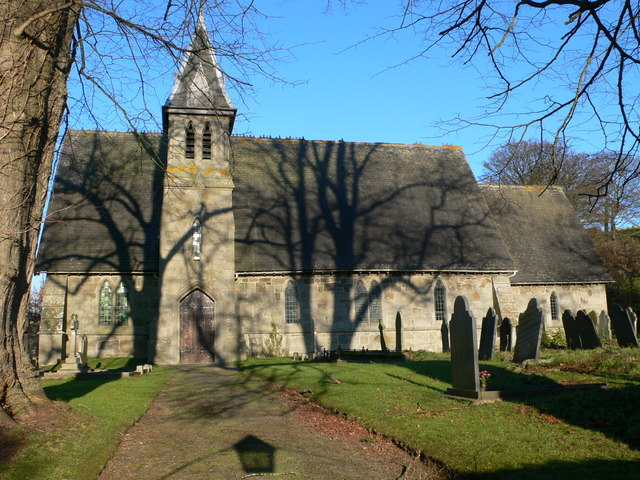
- Holy Trinity Church, Sarn, Montgomeryshire

- Location within Powys
- OS grid reference: SO204908
- Principal area: Powys
- Preserved county: Powys
- Country: Wales
- Sovereign state: United Kingdom
- Post town: NEWTOWN
- Postcode district: SY16
- Dialling code: 01686
- Police: Dyfed-Powys
- Fire: Mid and West Wales
- Ambulance: Welsh
- UK Parliament: Montgomeryshire and Glyndŵr
- Senedd Cymru – Welsh Parliament: Montgomeryshire

Sarn is a small village in Powys, Wales.

The village lies on the A489 road 6.4 miles (10.3 km) east of Newtown. There is a bus service through the village, with buses to Newtown, Churchstoke and Montgomery.

Less than a mile to the west is the smaller settlement of Llancowrid, also on the A489, at grid reference SO196908. The hamlets of City and Bachaethlon are 0.75 miles (1.21 km) from Sarn, on the minor road up to the Kerry Ridgeway.

The historic parish church is Holy Trinity, part of the Ridgeway Benefice, in the Clun Forest deanery of the Church of England's Diocese of Hereford. The village also has a Baptist church.

There is a village hall, a primary school and a public house — the Sarn Inn. A small recreation ground includes a tennis court and a bowling green. A small group of farmers called the Sarnies beat the Eggheads in 2005.

Historic buildings in the parish include Great Cefnyberen, a Grade II timber-framed house, which dates from the mid-16th century.

== Governance ==
It forms part of the Kerry community (in the ward of Sarn) and for Powys County Council the electoral division/ward of Kerry. It falls in the historic county of Montgomeryshire.
