= Brynrefail =

Village in Anglesey, Wales

Coordinates: 53.3565°N 4.2836°W

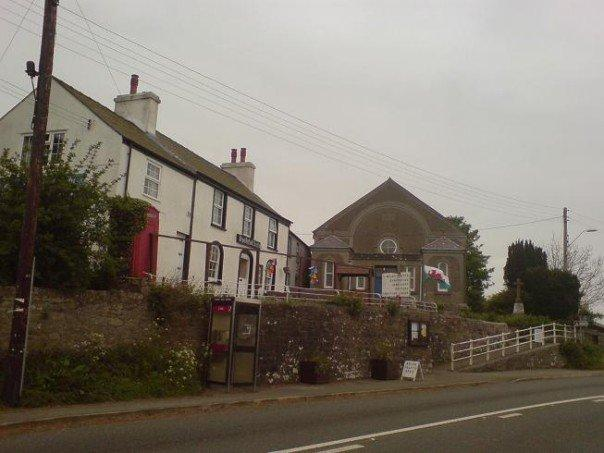
- Brynrefail shop and church

- Location within Anglesey
- Principal area: Anglesey
- Preserved county: Gwynedd
- Country: Wales
- Sovereign state: United Kingdom
- Police: North Wales
- Fire: North Wales
- Ambulance: Welsh
- UK Parliament: Ynys Môn
- Senedd Cymru – Welsh Parliament: Bangor Conwy Môn

Brynrefail (Welsh pronunciation) is a small village in north-east Anglesey, Wales. The village is located in the civil parish of Moelfre on the A5025 between Amlwch and Benllech.

== Landmarks ==
Brynrefail Chapel was built in the 19th century, with the cause established in 1852 and a headstone dating to 1896. The chapel was still in use in 1999.

Four men from the village lost their lives in World War I. Their names are displayed on the village war memorial next to the chapel.

== Culture and community ==
Brynrefail also contains a community hall which was re-opened in 2005, and previously contained a craft shop and food outlet named Anglesey Good Gifts. Tyddyn Mon, a 'Learning Disability Wales' centre, is found in the village.

== Transport ==
The village is on bus route 62 which runs between Bangor and Amlwch, providing access to Dulas Bay and Lligwy Bay. The A5025 runs through the village.
