= Bull Bay, Anglesey =

Bay and village in Anglesey, Wales

Coordinates: 53°25′N 4°21′W

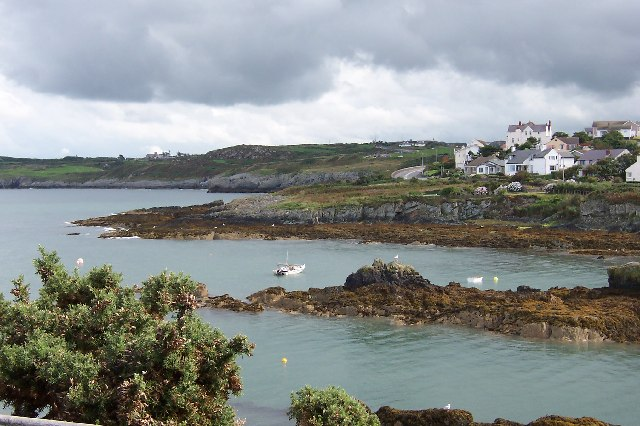

Map of Bull Bay, part of Amlwch Community

Bull Bay (Welsh: Porth Llechog) is a village and bay on the northern coast of Anglesey, Wales, close to Amlwch. Its Welsh name, Porth Llechog, means "sheltered bay". The English name is derived from Pwll y Tarw ("the bull's pool"), which is located near the shore close to the bay.

The village is located on the A5025. It is the most northerly village in Wales. Also, it contains Wales' most northerly golf course which was opened and funded by a local aristocrat in 1913 to a design by Herbert Fowler. The island of East Mouse lies within the bay, the coastline of which is rocky and contains many caves. Some of these rocks are over 570 million years old which make them amongst the oldest in Wales. The population as of the 2011 census was 287 with 61% having no form of Welsh identity.

Bull Bay is the home of Trireme Ynys Mon Rowing Club, a sea rowing club affiliated with the Welsh Sea Rowing Association. It mainly races with three classes of boat: Pembrokeshire Longboat, Celtic Longboat and Euro, with a boathouse near the site of the former lifeboat station.

== Lifeboat Station ==
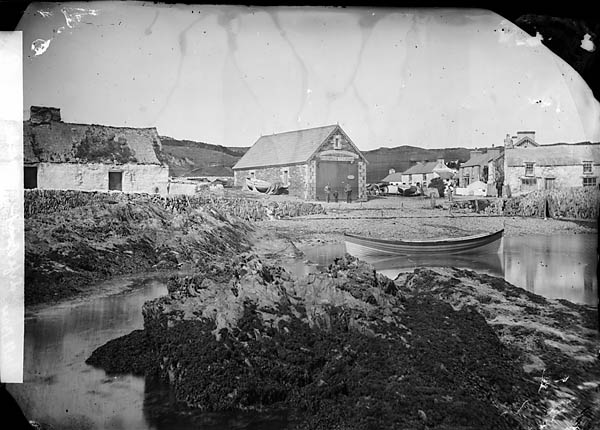
Life boat house, Porth Llechog, photographed around 1875

In 1867 the RNLI opened the Bull Bay Lifeboat Station. A 32-foot (9.8 m) boat named "Eleanor" was first in action in 1871, saving the crew of the schooner "Albion", and in 1877 rescued 20 passengers from the SS Dakota. The next two boats were both name "Curling", first a 34-foot (10 m) self-righting Woolfe & Son which was called out 6 times in 5 years, then a self-righting boat by Henderson & Co which cost £441 and continued in service until 1903. "Jamie Cullen" a 38-foot (12 m) Watson Class non self-righting boat arrived in 1904 at a cost of £993 from a legacy of Miss Marianne Cullen of Nottingham, which also required a new boat house. In June 1924 the RNLI closed the station. In 58 years the Bull Bay lifeboats were launched 41 times saving 63 lives and 7 ships.
