= Llaneilian =

Village and community in Anglesey, Wales

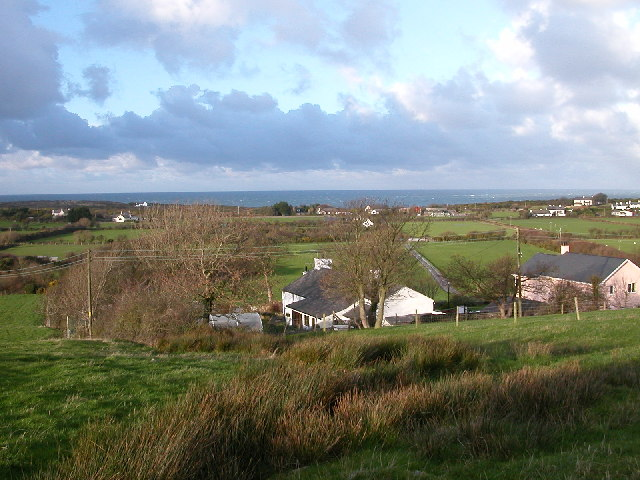
- Henblas, Llaneilian, looking north.

- Location within Anglesey
- Population: 1,186 (2011)
- OS grid reference: SH4792
- Community: Llaneilian
- Principal area: Anglesey
- Preserved county: Gwynedd
- Country: Wales
- Sovereign state: United Kingdom
- Post town: AMLWCH
- Postcode district: LL68
- Dialling code: 01407
- Police: North Wales
- Fire: North Wales
- Ambulance: Welsh
- UK Parliament: Ynys Môn
- Senedd Cymru – Welsh Parliament: Bangor Conwy Môn
- List of places UK Wales Anglesey 53.407°N 4.296°W Map of the community

Llaneilian (Welsh: [ɬanˈei̯ljan]) is a village and community in Anglesey, Wales. It is located in the north east of the island, 2.2 miles (3.5 km) east of Amlwch, 16.5 miles (26.6 km) north west of Menai Bridge and 12.5 miles (20.1 km) north of Llangefni. The community includes the villages and hamlets of Dulas, Llaneilian, Pengorffwysfa, Cerrig Man and Penysarn, Gadfa and Nebo, and at the 2001 census had a population of 1,192, decreasing slightly to 1,186 at the 2011 Census. The parish is crowned by its hill, Mynydd Eilian (177 metres), a HuMP, popular with walkers and ramblers (the Anglesey Coastal Path navigates most of the parish's coastline - all of which within the Anglesey Coastal Area of Outstanding Natural Beauty), and its beach, Traeth Eilian, which is popular with holidaymakers and for watersport activities. At the north easternmost point is Point Lynas, (on a clear day from the north coast of Anglesey the Isle of Man is visible with the streetlights of Douglas, Isle of Man visible on the horizon), while Ynys Dulas lies off the North East coast of the island, east of Dulas Bay.

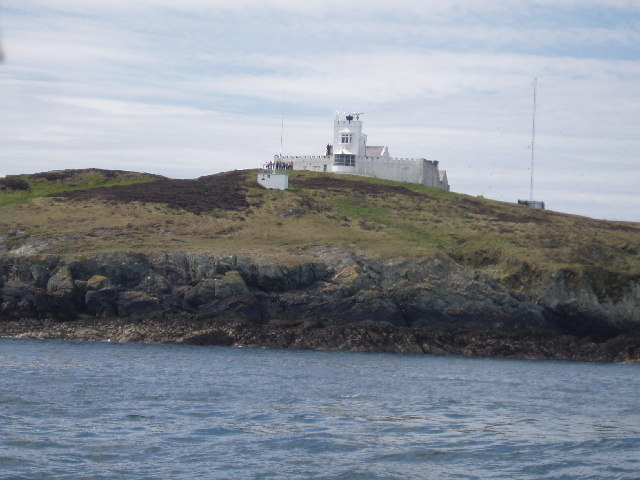
Point Lynas Lighthouse, Llaneilian

== History ==
=== Llys Caswallon, Court of the Kingdom of Gwynedd ===
The parish contains the remains of Llys Caswallon and there has been a traditional association of this site with the court of 5th Century King of Gwynedd Cadwallon Lawhir ap Einion - the third generation of the dynasty of Gwynedd, being the grandson of Cunedda, the progenitor of the royal dynasty of Gwynedd. With no visible evidence above ground it had been thought that the site indicated on the Ordnance Survey map of 1889, within a field near Mynnydd Eilian, might be without basis and by the mid 20th century had been largely discredited as a Llys site. However a geophysical survey in 2009 identified foundations of a rectangular building within a trapezoidal enclosure, for which an early medieval site was a strong possibility.

The Lineage of Cadwallon led to the famed reign of Rhodri the Great, who brought the kingdoms of Gwynedd, Powys and Seisyllwg under his control, and fought the threats of the Anglo Saxons and Vikings, and who was killed on the island of Anglesey in 854AD. Later, this lineage led to possibly the most well known of all the medieval kings of Wales, Hywel Dda, who came to rule most of Wales, and became synonymous with the codification of medieval Welsh law which became famed for a reputation of justice and early recognition of women's rights. His legacy endured in the form of his laws, which remained in active use throughout Wales until the appointed date of implementation of the Laws in Wales Acts 1535–1542 of Henry VIII of England who asserted his royal descent by blood-line from the House of Aberffraw, via Rhodri Mawr via Hywel Dda. It was this claim to this ancient Brittonic lineage by a British monarch that led to a widespread feeling of the fulfilment of the myth of the Mab Darogan, a messianic figure of Welsh legend destined to reclaim Britain for the Celtic inhabitants. The legacy of this lineage is represented in the main office buildings of the National Assembly for Wales being named "Tŷ Hywel" (the House of Hywel), within which the former debating chamber of the National Assembly for Wales has been converted into a youth debating chamber, the first of its kind in Europe, named "Siambr Hywel" (Hywel's Chamber) after Hywel Dda. The coat of arms of this dynasty is represented on the Royal Badge of Wales which appears on Acts of the National Assembly for Wales passed by the National Assembly for Wales.

=== World War I ===
In World War I a wireless telegraphy (radio) relay station at Llaneilian was used for communication with airships patrolling the Irish Sea for German submarines. Messages were forwarded by telephone to and from the airship base at RNAS Anglesey near Llangefni.

== Governance ==
An electoral ward in the same name exists. The ward includes some of Rhosybol community, to give a total population at the 2011 census of 2,264.

== Notable buildings ==
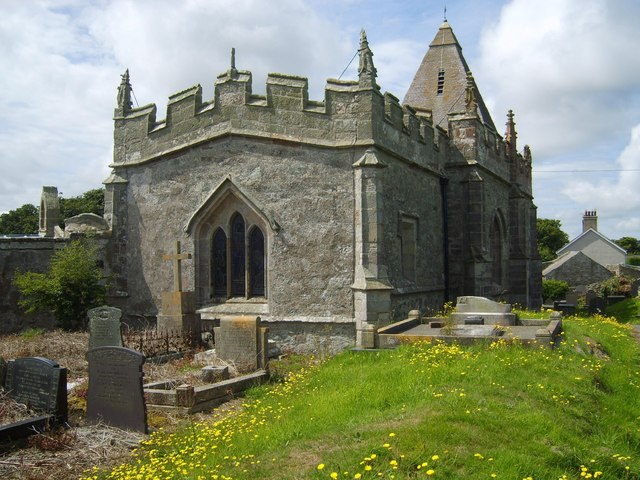
St Eilian's church

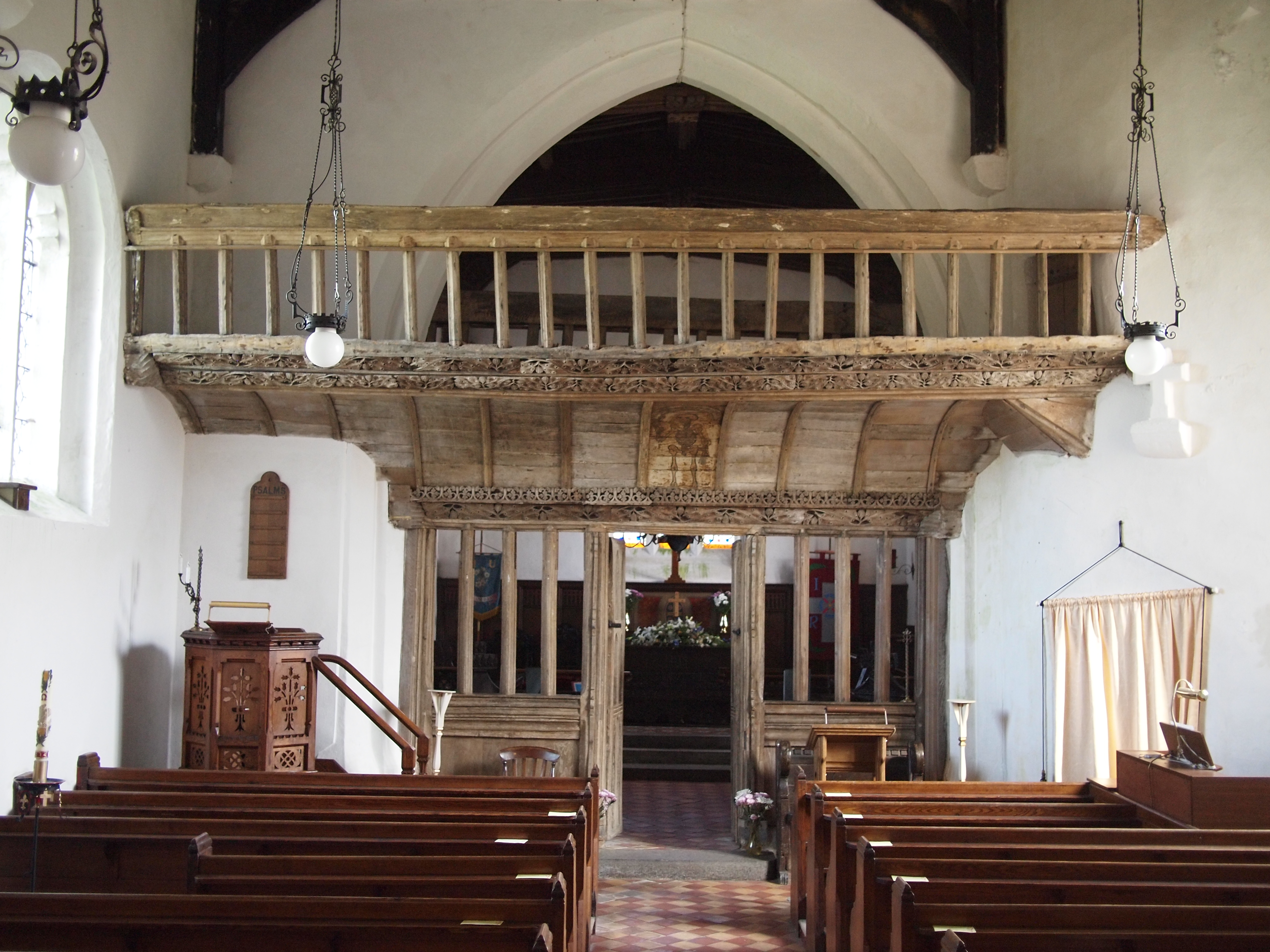
15th century rood screen and loft in St Eilian's church

Map of Llaneilian Community, showing the location of settlements and ancient churches.

Saint Eilian's Church is Grade I listed. A Celtic clas church, it has a 12th-century tower, 14th-century chapel and a nave and chancel dating from the 15th century. In the chancel is a 15th-century rood screen, and there are traces of post-medieval wall paintings. A painting of a skeleton bears the inscription "Colyn angau yw pechod" (English: The sting of death is sin). The Church is named after Saint Eilian (Eilianus). Eilian of Rome also known as Eilian of Anglesey was a 6th-century saint who came from Rome to Britain where he lived as a hermit in the area north of Anglesey. His feast day is 13 January. The churchyard contains the war grave of a Royal Navy sailor of World War I.

At Dulas is Saint Gwenllwyfo's Church, a mid-19th-century building designed by Henry Kennedy of Bangor. It is Grade II* listed. The nave and chancel contain 15th and 16th century Flemish stained glass, which had been removed from former Roman Catholic churches taken over by Protestants, who considered the images theologically unsound. Other examples are found at the Victoria and Albert Museum, the Burrell Collection in Glasgow, and the Metropolitan Museum of Art in New York. The church was built to replace the medieval church of St Gwenllwyfo, which had also served the Llys Dulas settlement, although it stood over a mile away at the other end of the dispersed village. The old church is now reduced to some low stone walls within a churchyard.

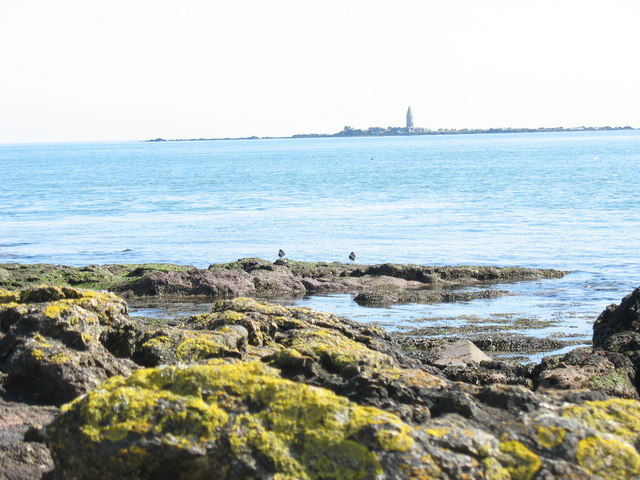
Ynys Dulas refuge tower

The refuge tower on Ynys Dulas was built in 1821 by James Hughes of Llysdulas as a refuge for shipwrecked sailors. It was stocked with essential foodstuffs to enable those stranded to survive until rescuers arrived.

Point Lynas Lighthouse is located on the northern headland. The first lighthouse was built by the Mersey Docks and Harbour Board in 1779. It was replaced in 1835, and moved up onto the hilltop, so does not need a tower. It did not come under the care of Trinity House until 1973. By 2001 the lights were fully automated, so no resident staff were needed. whilst the light is retained in operational use, the building and associated lighthouse keepers cottages were returned to the Mersey Docks and Harbour Board who sold them to be a private home and holiday accommodation.
