= Mynydd Bodafon =

Hill (177.6m) on Anglesey, Wales

Coordinates: 53.34244°N 4.29812°W

Yr Arwydd
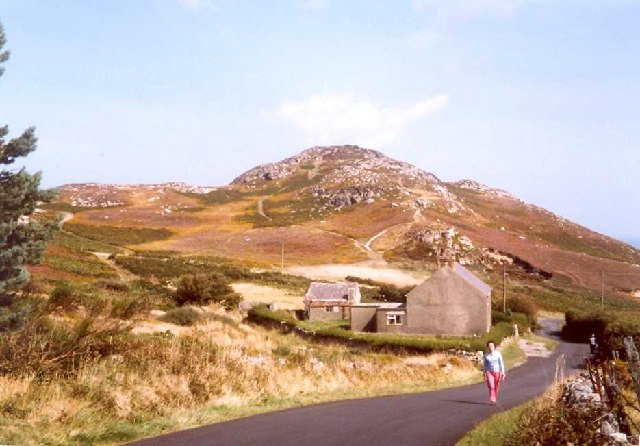

Highest point
- Elevation: 584 ft (178 m)
- Prominence: 584 ft (178 m)
- Parent peak: none - HP Anglesey
- Listing: Marilyn

Naming
- English translation: the signal
- Language of name: Welsh
- Pronunciation: Welsh: [ər ˈarwɪð]

Geography
- Location: Anglesey, Wales
- OS grid: SH472854
- Topo map: OS Landranger 114

Mynydd Bodafon (Welsh for 'Bodafon mountain') is a small collection of peaks including Yr Arwydd (Welsh for 'the sign' / 'signal') which is the highest point on the island of Anglesey (although not in the county of Anglesey — see Holyhead Mountain). It lies about 2 1/2 miles (4.0 km) west of the coastal town of Moelfre and 2/3 mi (1.1 km) south-west of the hamlet of Brynrefail. The meaning of Bodafon is obscure. Bod is a common placename element meaning 'dwelling' and afon here is probably a corruption of the personal name A(e)ddan (afon is Welsh for 'river' but topography rules that out).

On the mountain is a lake named Gors Fawr (the big marsh), containing rudd, roach and recently pike. Originally, there were two lakes on either side of the road but one is now a covered reservoir. The lake is spring fed despite local legends that claim it is connected to lakes in Snowdonia, and is bottomless. To the east of the lake is found an Iron Age settlement called Cytiau'r Gwyddelod (Irishmen's huts).

The wildlife is dictated by the heathland habitat, different heathers, two types of gorse, cotton grass, bog asphodel, tormentil etc. There are adders, lizards, stone chats, peregrine, chough and cuckoos (there is an old local song about the cuckoo on Bodafon) etc. Heron, coot and ducks are in the lake and water rail are occasionally seen or heard. A rare form of pillwort exists in the lake. Mynydd Bodafon holds a special place in druidic and spiritual history

Although the name Mynydd Bodafon may refer to the hill itself, it is also the name for the wider geographical area, which is part of the Penrhoslligwy parish.

Rabbits tend to be the only grazing animals currently and parts of the heath are reverting to pioneer woodland because of that. There are occasional fires that sweep across the heathland but these are often at the wrong time of year and subsequently encourage bracken.
