= Penysarn =

Village in Anglesey, Wales

Coordinates: 53.387°N 04.315°W

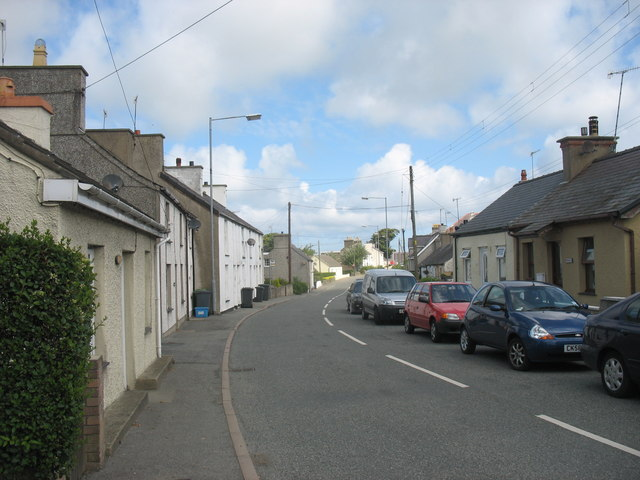
- Chapel Street, Penysarn

- Location within Anglesey
- Population: 595 (2011 census)
- OS grid reference: SH460908
- Principal area: Anglesey
- Preserved county: Gwynedd
- Country: Wales
- Sovereign state: United Kingdom
- Post town: PENYSARN
- Postcode district: LL69 9
- Dialling code: 01407 / 01248
- Police: North Wales
- Fire: North Wales
- Ambulance: Welsh
- UK Parliament: Ynys Môn
- Senedd Cymru – Welsh Parliament: Ynys Môn

Penysarn (/pɛnˈsɑːrn/; Welsh pronunciation: [pɛnˈsarn]) is a small village located within the community of Llaneilian, in the north-eastern corner of Anglesey, Wales. It is on the north-eastern side of Parys Mountain, at approximately 140–150 feet (43–46 m) above sea level. The settlement expanded in the 18th century with the arrival of miners working at the nearby copper mines. The population as of the 2011 census was 595.

== Name ==
Penysarn is sometimes written 'Pen-y-sarn', but in both cases, the 'y' is silent. The English translation from Welsh means 'the end of the causeway'.

== History ==
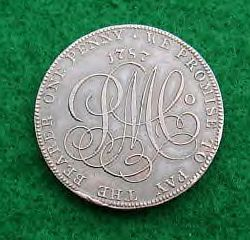
Parys Penny

Penysarn grew throughout the 18th century, close to what was once the world's largest copper mine, located at Parys Mountain. During this time, the mountain and surrounding area had their own nationally recognized currency, known as the Parys Penny, or Anglesey Penny. These coins were made from copper mined at the mountain.

The village's early expansion was principally due to employment opportunities created by the busy mines and from providing ancillary services such as clog-making, blacksmithing and baking. Several light industrial companies existed in Penysarn until the 1990s, but employment today is largely limited to core services, such as the village shop and school. Tourism has brought some business opportunities, with the creation of a small camping and caravan site and several properties being rented out as holiday cottages, but most workers living in Penysarn today commute to local towns for work.

Map of Penysarn, in Llaneilian Community.

== Amenities ==
The village is the starting point for several, officially designated, circular tourist walks. These include industrial heritage walks such as Llwybr Cadi Rondol, which takes walkers through the old copper mines at Mynydd Parys, and Llwybr Eilian, which takes walkers through Llaneilian and the surrounding countryside.

== Notable people ==
- Lewis William Lewis "Llew Llwyfo", (1831 - 1901), poet, novelist, journalist, conductor, singer and winner of several Eistoddfodau.
- John Eilian Jones (1904 - 1985), journalist, poet and broadcaster.
