= Dulas, Anglesey =

Village in Anglesey, Wales

Coordinates: 53.363947°N 4.301532°W

City Dulas
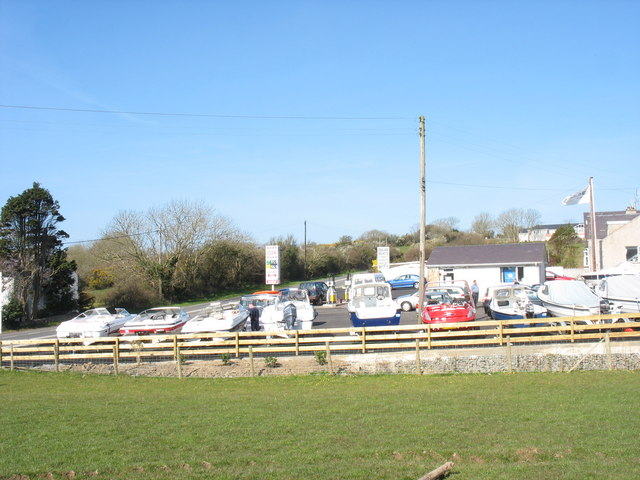

- Location within Anglesey
- Principal area: Anglesey
- Preserved county: Gwynedd
- Country: Wales
- Sovereign state: United Kingdom
- Post town: DULAS
- Postcode district: LL70
- Police: North Wales
- Fire: North Wales
- Ambulance: Welsh
- UK Parliament: Ynys Môn
- Senedd Cymru – Welsh Parliament: Ynys Môn

Dulas (Welsh pronunciation) or City Dulas is a village in Anglesey, in north-west Wales. It is situated on the A5025 road, near the coast (Dulas Bay) at only 5 metres (16 ft) above sea level. It is in the community of Llaneilian.

== Origin of the name ==
The village has never held the status of a city and "City" is not a recognisable Welsh word, so its origin is unclear. It may be that the name came from an Anglicisation of Saith Tŷ, which is Welsh for "Seven Houses".

There are two places in Wales simply called 'City': City, Powys and City, Vale of Glamorgan.

Map of Llaneilian Community, showing City Dulas and its churches.
