= Parys Mountain =

Hill (147m) on Anglesey, Wales

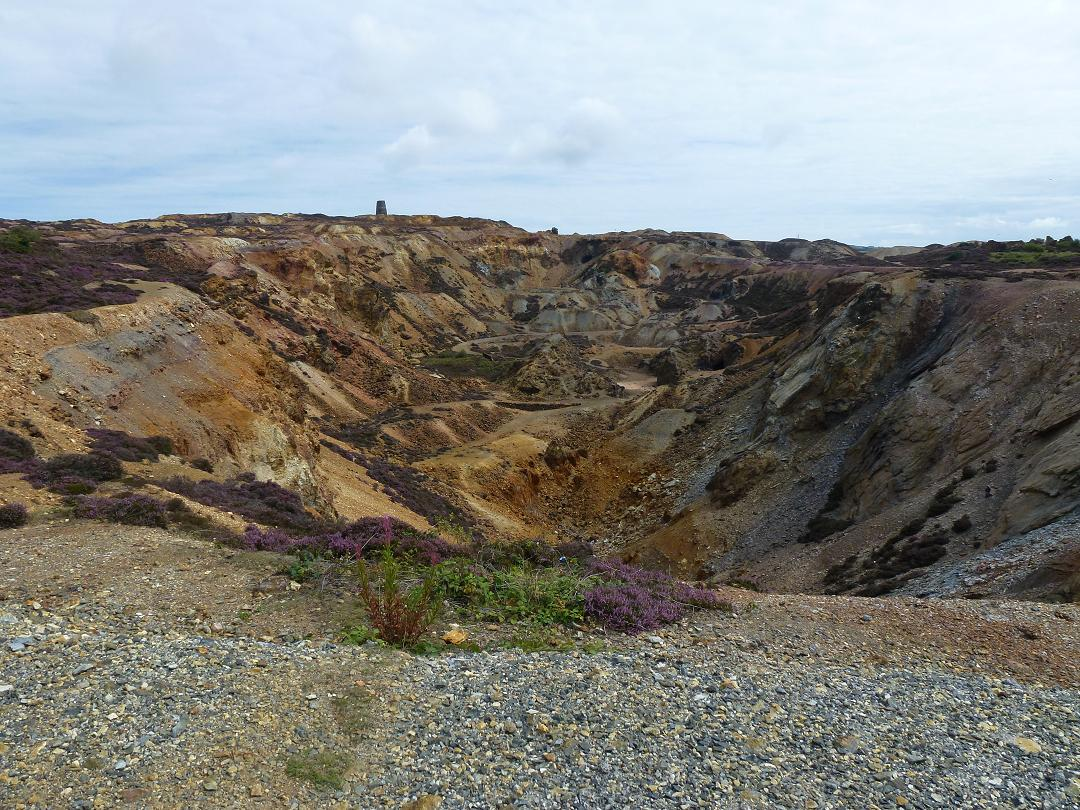
- Parys Mountain

Highest point
- Elevation: 147 m (482 ft)
- Prominence: 66 m (217 ft)
- Coordinates: 53°22′56″N 4°21′9″W

Geography
- Location: Anglesey, United Kingdom
- OS grid: SH445905
- Topo map: OS Landranger 114

Parys Mountain (Welsh: Mynydd Parys) is located south of the town of Amlwch in north east Anglesey, Wales. Originally known as Trysclwyn, the high ground is reputed to have gained its current name when it was given to Robert Parys, Chamberlain of North Wales by Henry IV. It is the site of a large copper mine that was extensively exploited in the late 18th century. Parys Mountain is a mountain in name only, being a hill with an elevation of less than 150m.

== History ==
Parys Mountain was mined for copper ore in the early Bronze Age, as shown by sub-surface debris nearly 4,000 years old revealed during excavations in 2002. Since then, access has been regained to the sealed underground workings of the Parys mine, revealing further evidence of ancient mining. Parys Mountain is thus one of the few sites in Britain where there is evidence for the prehistoric beginnings of the British metal mining industry.

The 18th century miners recognised that they were following in the steps of much earlier workers, an observation that was then linked to the discovery locally of copper ingots bearing Roman inscriptions. Conclusive evidence that the Romans worked the mine, e.g. datable pottery, has yet to be found and may have been obliterated by the mining in the 18th century.

In 1762, Alexander Frazer convinced the owner, Sir Nicholas Bayly, to allow him to search for copper, but he failed to find it in economically viable quantities. In 1764, Charles Roe of Macclesfield approached Sir Nicholas Bayly wanting to lease the copper mine at Penrhyn du, on the Llŷn Peninsula. This was agreed provided they also took a lease on part of Parys Mountain and continued the exploration work recently abandoned. After considerable expenditure searching for copper ore at Parys Mountain, they decided to instruct their agents to cease the search for new veins. However a last-ditch attempt was successful when their agent, Rowland Pugh, a local miner, discovered the "Great Lode" on 2 March 1768 and was rewarded with a bottle of whisky and a rent-free house for his lifetime. The vein, discovered only 7 feet down, was to prove so valuable that 2 March was celebrated locally by a festival at least until 1858.

A further discovery of ore was made in 1775 further to the West of "the Great Lode" by the Reverend Edward Hughes, who was co-owner of that area with Sir Nicholas Bayly, and to exploit this he formed the Parys Mine Company that same year. The 21 year lease of Charles Roe expired in 1785, and so the Earl of Uxbridge (who had succeeded Sir Nicholas Bayly), decided to form the Mona Mine Company. The production from Parys Mountain by these two adjacent companies dominated the world's copper market during the 1780s, when the mine was the largest in Europe. Its rise severely damaged the mining industry in Cornwall. The ore was exported via Amlwch, which grew to a substantial town. A loading pier was built at Amlwch harbour in 1782, and in 1793 by act of parliament the port was enlarged and dredged with the addition of piers, buoys and mooring posts to accommodate the seaborne traffic. The copper from the mine was used to sheath the British Admiralty's wooden ships of war, to prevent the growth of seaweed and barnacles and to protect the wood from attack by shipworms. This increased the speed and manoeuvrability of the vessels, and enabled them to remain at sea for longer as there was less need to return to port for maintenance (see Copper sheathing for further details).

Although the ore here was of variable quality, this was more than compensated for by the fact that it occurred in two large masses close to the surface. Initially ore was worked on the surface from shallow shafts, next by open-pit mining, and finally underground from adits or shafts. The ore was broken into small lumps by hand, the best ore being shipped to Lancashire or to the Lower Swansea valley in South Wales through the port of Swansea for smelting. Copper was concentrated and extracted from the remainder using kilns and furnaces on site. It was also discovered that purer metal could be obtained efficiently, although in small amounts, by its precipitation from drainage water with scrap iron in purpose-built ponds. Associated with the mines, important chemical industries were established on the mountain based on by-products such as ochre pigments, sulphur, vitriol and alum. The processes were described by the German writer and translator Augustin Gottfried Ludwig Lentin (1764–1823), who visited Parys Mountain in the 1790s and published his findings in Briefe über die Insel Anglesea: vorzüglich über das dasige Kupfer-Bergwerk und die dazu gehörigen Schmelzwerke und Fabriken (Leipzig: Crusius, 1800).

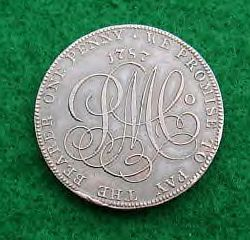
Parys Penny

In response to a national shortage of small currency, the Parys Mine Company produced its own coinage between 1787 and 1793. The Parys Penny, also known as the Anglesey Penny, was used by the mine to pay workers, and also by the populace at large. It is thought that around ten million pennies and half pennies were minted.

Underground mining of Parys Mountain ceased in 1904; however, precipitation of copper from mine water continued. A dam was built inside one of the main drainage adits, and the water was periodically released into the precipitation pits by opening valves. In 1927 it was hoped that work on the mines could be restarted and The Welsh Copper Trust (Ltd) was formed. In a survey of the mine published in a pamphlet in 1928 the precipitation pits were still in use with water being drained 3-monthly. It was claimed in the survey that the tailings of the old workings contained considerable copper as the old method of hand picking the ore generally rejected ore with less than 6% copper as uneconomic. It was also claimed that a 10 foot vein containing 2 to 3% copper had been left below ground as uneconomic. Linked to The Welsh Copper Trust Ltd was another company, the Mona Copper Co (Ltd) formed in October 1928. However it appears these attempts to restart the mine came to nothing.

This operation of the precipitation pits appears to have ceased around 1940, and in the 1990s it was realised that the large volume of water held back by a decaying dam and inoperative valves posed a flood risk. As a result a dewatering exercise took place in 2003, and with pumps operating at 50 litres per second it took 8 weeks to sufficiently dewater the mine, after which the dam was breached to prevent the problem re-occurring. This operation dropped the water levels by 70 metres (230 ft), and gave access to many more passages and to a connection to the nearby previously inaccessible Mona Mine. The entry into these sections was filmed for the TV series Extreme Archaeology. Due to the high chemical content of the water, snottites thrive in the until recently submerged passages.

== Modern day ==
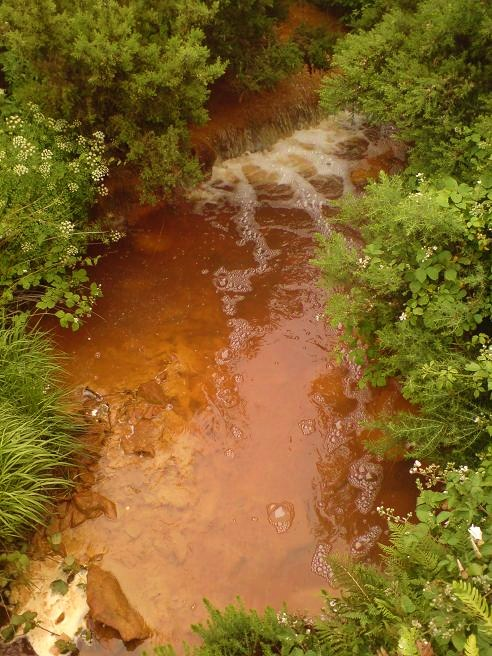
A stream running from the mine through Amlwch contaminated by iron salts

Drone footage of Parys Mountain and Cairn Windmill

There is a waymarked trail around the mountain, giving views of Amlwch Port to the north and the nearby Trysglwyn wind farm to the south. Those wishing to explore the historic mine levels need to contact the Parys Underground Group.

Renewed exploration of Parys Mountain by drilling resulted in the discovery of copper rich stockwork in 1962 - now referred to as the Northern Copper Zone. Several other zones of mineralisation were subsequently discovered and in 1988 the new public company, Anglesey Mining plc was formed. This owns the western part of the mountain and between 1988 and 1990 it sunk a 300m deep shaft and drove 850m of levels so as to remove minerals for processing in a pilot plant. Unfortunately a recession caused a big fall in metal prices and the project was shelved.

Further drilling since then has better defined the as yet unexploited resources, which include 6,500,000 tonnes containing 10% combined zinc, lead and copper with some silver and gold. The company has permits and a plan to restart mining operations at 350,000 tonnes per year. Drilling to better define the Northern Copper Zone started in late 2023, with the target of improving the confidence of the mineral estimates for inclusion in the feasibility study, and explore adjacent areas as yet undrilled.

Due to the high level of soil contamination, plant life is sparse on or near the mountain, but there are a number of examples of rare plants and bacteria. The bare, heavily mined landscape give the mountain a strange appearance which has been used in the filming of science fiction films and television shows such as Mortal Kombat Annihilation.

Mynydd Parys is an anchor point on the European Route of Industrial Heritage.

== Geology ==
The volcanogenic massive sulfide ore deposit is located at the border of the Ordovician to the Llandovery epoch. The ore is covered by an overlying layer of volcanic rhyolites.

The mineral Anglesite, with the chemical formula PbSO_{4}, was first recognised by William Withering in 1783, who discovered it in the Parys copper-mine; the name was given by F. S. Beudant in 1832.

== See also ==
- Parys Mountain Windmill
