= Amlwch =

Town and community in Anglesey, Wales

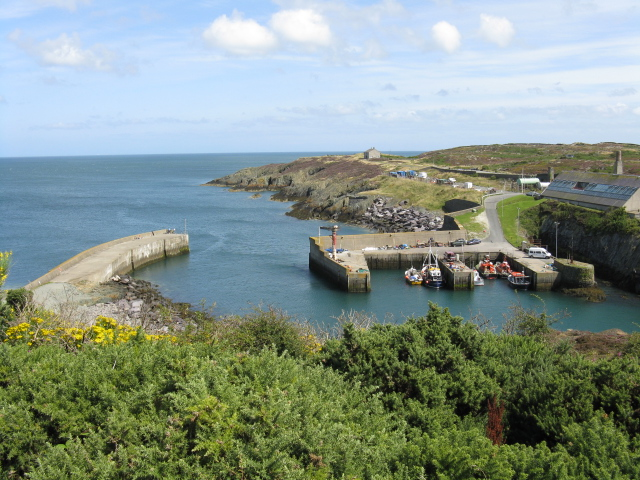
- Amlwch Port

- Location within Anglesey
- Area: 18.19 km^{2} (7.02 sq mi)
- Population: 3,789 (2011)
  - Density: 208/km^{2} (540/sq mi)
- OS grid reference: SH4492
- Community: Amlwch
- Principal area: Anglesey
- Preserved county: Gwynedd
- Country: Wales
- Sovereign state: United Kingdom
- Post town: AMLWCH
- Postcode district: LL68
- Dialling code: 01407
- Police: North Wales
- Fire: North Wales
- Ambulance: Welsh
- UK Parliament: Ynys Môn
- Senedd Cymru – Welsh Parliament: Bangor Conwy Môn
- List of places UK Wales Anglesey 53.406°N 4.341°W Map of the community

Map of Amlwch Community

Amlwch (Welsh: [ˈamlʊχ]) is a port town and community in Wales. It is situated on the north coast of the Isle of Anglesey, on the A5025 which connects it to Holyhead and to Menai Bridge. As well as Amlwch town and Amlwch Port, other settlements within the community include Burwen, Bull Bay (Porthllechog) and Pentrefelin. The town has a beach in Llaneilian, and it has significant coastal cliffs. Tourism is an important element of the local economy. At one time it was a booming mining town that became the centre of a vast global trade in copper ore. The harbour inlet became a busy port and significant shipbuilding and ship repair centre, as well as an embarkation point with boats sailing to the Isle of Man and to Liverpool. The community covers an area of about 15 square kilometres.

== Town centre ==
The name Amlwch, a reference to the site of the town's harbour, Porth Amlwch, derives from Welsh am ("about, on or around") and llwch (an old word meaning "inlet, creek" - similar to the Gaelic word "loch" for a body of water).

On 23 November 1981, the first tornado of the record-breaking 1981 United Kingdom tornado outbreak, an F1/T2 tornado, passed through Amlwch.

At the 2011 census the community had a population of 3,789.

The local newspaper for northeastern Anglesey is Yr Arwydd ('The Sign'). Yr Arwydd is the local Welsh name for Mynydd Bodafon, the paper covers the area surrounding the mountain, and has an image of the summit as its logo.

=== Industry ===
Amlwch grew rapidly in the 18th century near what was then the world's biggest copper mine at the nearby Parys Mountain. By the late 18th century, Amlwch had a population of around 10,000 and was the second largest town in Wales after Merthyr Tydfil. It was at this time that its harbour was also extended to accommodate the ships needed to transport the ore.

When the copper production declined, a wide variety of industrial activities were developed to take its place. Ship-building in the narrow harbour area and other sites around the coast of Amlwch Port was a significant enterprise from the 1820s and grew in significance after the railway opened in 1864, reducing the use of the harbour for copper and other goods by ship. By 1912 the main shipbuilding activities were in decline, and neither the harbour nor shipyards offered much commercial activity.

In 1953 Octel began the extraction of bromine from seawater at a plant built just west of the port. The bromine was taken to Ellesmere Port where it was used in the manufacture of anti-knock additives for leaded petrol. When leaded petrol was withdrawn in 2000 the demand for bromine fell. The plant ceased production in 2004.

In the 1970s, Amlwch had an offshore single point mooring, Amlwch Oil Terminal, which receives large oil tankers unsuitable for the Mersey. Reception tanks were located ashore and the oil was pumped from there to the refineries on the Manchester Ship Canal. The terminal closed in 1990.

When copper mining began to decline in the mid-1850s, shipbuilding became the main industry with many people becoming involved in ship repair and other maritime industries. The town was home to a brewing industry and also had tobacco works, producing the famous Amlwch Shag Tobacco - "Baco Shag Amlwch".

=== Railway ===
Amlwch station was the northern terminus of the Anglesey Central Railway which was opened in 1864. It closed to passengers a hundred years later, in 1964, but for the next 30 years was used by freight trains. In 1951 the Amlwch Octel bromide works installed an extension to the line from Amlwch station into their premises. After the passenger service ceased the line continued until 1993 with freight trains bringing sulphuric acid in to the Octel works, and transporting bromine and related products used in fuel additives, back to the main line, bound for Ellesmere Port.

In 1993 the freight activity was transferred to road vehicles and use of the line ceased. The rails were not lifted however, leaving open the prospect that the line could be restored as a tourist and local transport facility for Amlwch, Llanerchymedd and Llangefni. In 2012 a local enthusiast group, Anglesey Central Railway, or Lein Amlwch, were granted permission to clear and survey the line condition, and in May 2017 the Welsh Government announced that re-opening Llangefni station was under active consideration, raising a strong hope that the service could one day continue north to reach Amlwch again.

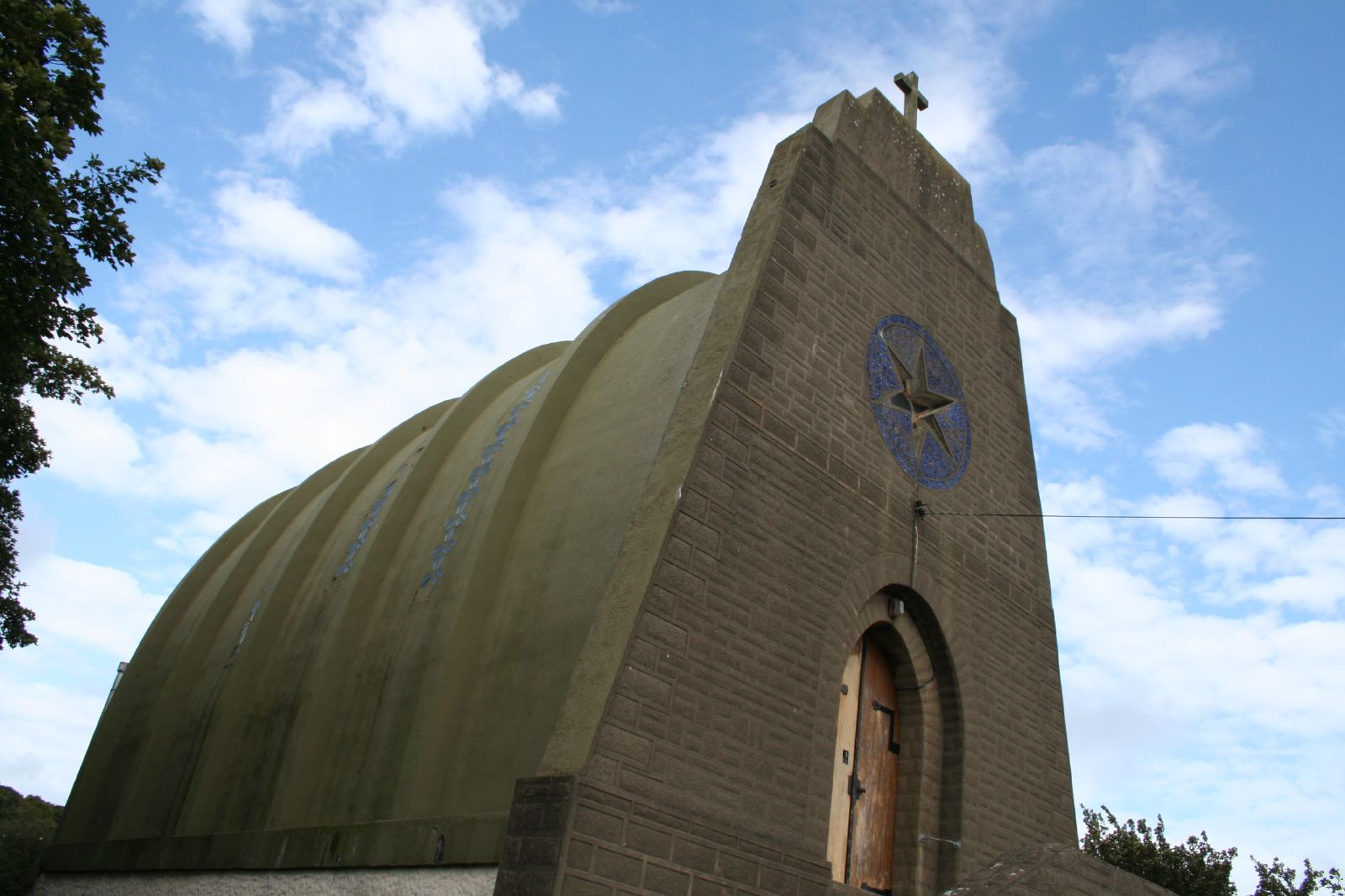
Our Lady Star of the Sea and St Winefride

=== Landmarks ===
Attractions in Amlwch include its restored port area, the Anglesey Coastal Path which passes through it, its watch tower containing an exhibition by Geo Môn, maritime and copper mining museums, St Eleth's Church (which dates from 1800) and the reinforced concrete Catholic church Our Lady Star of the Sea and St Winefride, built in 1937.

== Local government ==
There are two tiers of local government covering Amlwch, at community (town) and county level: Amlwch Town Council and Isle of Anglesey County Council. The town council is based at the old police station on Lôn Goch and comprises fifteen councillors elected from the three community wards of Town, Rural and Amlwch Port. Amlwch is in the Twrcelyn electoral ward which also includes Llanbadrig, Llaneilian and Rhosybol, electing three county councillors to the county council.

=== Administrative history ===
Amlwch was an ancient parish. When elected parish and district councils were established in 1894, Amlwch was given a parish council and included in the Twrcelyn Rural District. In 1901 the parish was converted into an urban district. Amlwch Urban District was abolished in 1974, with its area instead becoming a community. District-level functions passed to Ynys Môn-Isle of Anglesey Borough Council, which in 1996 was reconstituted as a county council.

== Sport and leisure ==
The town's leisure centre is one of the few on Anglesey and has a swimming pool, sports centre. It is situated on Anglesey's 125-mile stretch of coast that is designated Area of Outstanding Natural Beauty. The town also has two football clubs, Amlwch Town F.C., who play in the Welsh Alliance League, and Amlwch Port F.C., a Sunday League pub team that plays in the North Wales Sunday League. Amlwch has a sea rowing club based in Bull Bay, Trireme Ynys Mon Rowing Club.

== Notable people ==
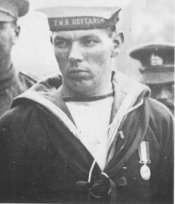
William Williams (VC), 1890

- Billy Butler (born 1942), radio and television presenter
- William Edwards (1938–2007), Labour politician, born in Amlwch
- Thomas Parry Jones (1935–2013) scientist, inventor and entrepreneur from Carreglefn
- Lemmy (1945–2015), lead singer and primary songwriter of the rock band Motörhead, attended Ysgol Syr Thomas Jones
- Captain Keith Paul Mills (born 1959), Royal Marines officer who commanded the defence of South Georgia against the Argentines in 1982.
- Edward Parry (ca.1599 – 1650) Church of Ireland Bishop of Killaloe, born in Madyn Dyswy
- William Roos (1808–1878), artist and engraver
- Andy Whitfield (1971–2011), actor, brought up in Bull Bay
- William Williams (1890–1965), a Welsh recipient of the Victoria Cross
