= List of Cadw properties =

Cadw is the historic environment service of the Welsh Government which manages historical buildings and ancient monuments in Wales.

| Property | | | Image | Type | Access | Principal area | Community | Historic county | Grid reference | Coordinates | Ref. |
| Common English name | Standardised name | | Image | Type | Access | Principal area | Community | Historic county | Grid reference | Coordinates | Ref. |
| Common English name | Welsh | English | Image | Type | Access | Principal area | Community | Historic county | Grid reference | Coordinates | Ref. |
|---|---|---|---|---|---|---|---|---|---|---|---|
| Barclodiad y Gawres | Beddrod Siambr Barclodiad y Gawres | Barclodiad y Gawres Chambered Tomb | Barclodiad y Gawres, Interior | Burial Chamber | Free | Isle of Anglesey | Aberffraw | Anglesey | SH329707 | 53.2072°N 4.5036°W | |
| Basingwerk Abbey | Abaty Dinas Basing | Basingwerk Abbey | Basingwerk Abbey | Religious | Free | Flintshire | Holywell | Flintshire | SJ196774 | 53.288°N 3.2074°W | |
| Beaumaris Castle | Castell Biwmares | Beaumaris Castle | Beaumaris Castle | Castle; World Heritage Site. | Pay | Isle of Anglesey | Beaumaris | Anglesey | SH607762 postcode LL58 8AP | 53.2649°N 4.0897°W | |
| Blaenavon Ironworks | Gwaith Haearn Blaenafon | Blaenafon Ironworks | | Industrial; World Heritage Site. | Free | Torfaen | Blaenavon | Monmouthshire | SO249092 postcode NP4 9RN | 51.777°N 3.0892°W | |
| Bodowyr | Beddrod Siambr Bodowyr | Bodowyr Chambered Tomb | | Burial Chamber | Free | Isle of Anglesey | Llanidan | Anglesey | SH462681 | 53.1882°N 4.3029°W | |
| Y Gaer | Caer Rufeinig y Gaer | Y Gaer Roman Fort | | Roman Fort | Free | Powys | Yscir | Brecknockshire | SO003296 | 51.9565°N 3.4517°W | |
| Bronllys Castle | Castell Bronllys | | | Castle | Free | Powys | Bronllys | Brecknockshire | SO149347 | 52.0044°N 3.2407°W | |
| Bryn Celli Ddu | Beddrod Siambr Bryn Celli Ddu | Bryn Celli Ddu Chambered Tomb | | Burial Chamber | Free | Isle of Anglesey | Llanddaniel Fab | Anglesey | SH507701 | 53.2077°N 4.2361°W | |
| Bryntail lead mine | Gwaith Plwm Bryn-tail | Bryn-tail Leadworks | | Industrial | Free | Powys | Llanidloes Without | Montgomeryshire | SN913868 | 52.4688°N 3.6008°W | |
| Caer Gybi | Caer Rufeinig Caer Gybi | Caer Gybi Roman Fort | | Roman Fort | Free | Isle of Anglesey | Holyhead | Anglesey | SH247826 | 53.3116°N 4.632°W | |
| Caer Lêb | Fferm Frythonig-Rufeinig Caer Lêb | Caer Lêb Romano-British Farm | | Enclosure | Free | Isle of Anglesey | Llanidan | Anglesey | SH472674 | 53.1819°N 4.2866°W | |
| Caer y Twr | Tŵr Gwylio Rhufeinig Caer y Twr | Caer y Twr Roman Watchtower | | Hill Fort | Free | Isle of Anglesey | Trearddur | Anglesey | SH219829 | 53.3131°N 4.6747°W | |
| Caergwrle Castle | Castell Caergwrle | | | Castle | Free | Flintshire | Caergwrle | Flintshire | SJ3057557213 | 53.10729°N 3.037164°W | |
| Caerleon Roman Fortress and Baths | Amffitheatr Rufeinig Caerllion Baddondy Rhufeinig Caerllion Barics Rhufeinig Caerllion | Caerleon Roman Amphitheatre Caerleon Roman Baths Caerleon Roman Barracks | | Roman Fort and Baths Barracks | Free | Newport | Caerleon | Monmouthshire | ST337906 | 51.6103°N 2.9588°W | |
| Caernarfon Castle | Castell Caernarfon | | | Castle; World Heritage Site. | Pay | Gwynedd | Caernarfon | Caernarfonshire | SH477626 postcode LL55 2AY | 53.1394°N 4.277°W | |
| Caernarfon town walls | Muriau Tref Caernarfon | Caernarfon Town Walls | | Town Walls; World Heritage Site. | Free | Gwynedd | Caernarfon | Caernarfonshire | SH479626 | 53.141°N 4.2754°W | |
| Caerphilly Castle | Castell Caerffili | Caerphilly Castle | | Castle | Pay | Caerphilly | Caerphilly | Glamorganshire | ST155870 | 51.5763°N 3.2206°W | |
| Caerwent | Tref Rufeinig Caer-went | Caer-went Roman Town | | Roman Town | Free | Monmouthshire | Caerwent | Monmouthshire | ST469907 | 51.6126°N 2.7683°W | |
| Capel Garmon | Beddrod Siambr Capel Garmon | Capel Garmon Chambered Tomb | | Burial Chamber | Free | Conwy | Bro Garmon | Denbighshire | SH817543 | 53.073°N 3.7658°W | |
| Capel Lligwy | Capel Llugwy | | | Religious | Free | Isle of Anglesey | Moelfre | Anglesey | SH499863 | 53.3523°N 4.2564°W | |
| Carew Cross | Croes Caeriw | Carew Cross | | Religious | Free | Pembrokeshire | Carew | Pembrokeshire | SN047037 | 51.698°N 4.8278°W | |
| Carreg Cennen Castle | Castell Carreg Cennen | | | Castle | Pay | Carmarthenshire | Dyffryn Cennen | Carmarthenshire | SN668190 | 51.8545°N 3.9352°W | |
| Carreg Coetan Arthur | Beddrod Siambr Carreg Coetan Arthur | Carreg Coetan Arthur Chambered Tomb | | Burial Chamber | Free | Pembrokeshire | Newport | Pembrokeshire | SN060394 | 52.0186°N 4.8282°W | |
| Carswell Medieval House | Tŷ Canoloesol Carswell | Carswell Medieval House | | Domestic | Free (Ext.) | Pembrokeshire | Penally | Pembrokeshire | SN098010 | 51.676°N 4.7523°W | |
| Castell Bryn Gwyn | Clostir Cynhanesyddol Castell Bryngwyn | Castell Bryngwyn Prehistoric Enclosure | | Prehistoric | Free | Isle of Anglesey | Llanidan | Anglesey | SH465670 | 53.1784°N 4.2979°W | |
| Castell Coch | Castell Coch | | | Castle | Pay | Cardiff | Tongwynlais | Glamorganshire | ST130826 | 51.536°N 3.2549°W | |
| Castell y Bere | Castell y Bere | | | Castle | Free | Gwynedd | Llanfihangel-y-Pennant | Merionethshire | SH667085 | 52.6583°N 3.9711°W | |
| Bulwarks Camp, Chepstow | Clostir Cynhanesyddol Bwlwarcau | Bulwarks Prehistoric Enclosure | | Prehistoric enclosure | Free | Monmouthshire | Chepstow | Monmouthshire | ST538927 | 51.6312°N 2.6689°W | |
| Chepstow Castle | Castell Cas-gwent | Chepstow Castle | | Castle | Pay | Monmouthshire | Chepstow | Monmouthshire | ST533940 | 51.6437°N 2.6755°W | |
| Chepstow Port Wall | Mur Porthladd Cas-gwent | Chepstow Port Wall | | Town Walls | Free | Monmouthshire | Chepstow | Monmouthshire | ST533937 | 51.6404°N 2.6762°W | |
| Cilgerran Castle | Castell Cilgerran | | | Castle | Pay | Pembrokeshire | Cilgerran | Pembrokeshire | SN194431 | 52.0569°N 4.6342°W | |
| Coity Castle | Castell Coety | | | Castle | Free | Bridgend | Coity Higher | Glamorganshire | SS923814 | 51.5221°N 3.5534°W | |
| Conwy Castle | Castell Conwy | | | Castle; World Heritage Site. | Pay | Conwy | Conwy | Caernarfonshire | SH783774 postcode LL32 8AY | 53.2801°N 3.8256°W | |
| Conwy town walls | Muriau Tref Conwy | Conwy Town Walls | | Town Walls; World Heritage Site. | Free | Conwy | Conwy | Caernarfonshire | SH780776 | 53.2817°N 3.8312°W | |
| Criccieth Castle | Castell Cricieth | | | Castle | Pay | Gwynedd | Criccieth | Caernarfonshire | SH499377 | 52.916°N 4.2324°W | |
| Cymer Abbey | Abaty Cymer | Cymer Abbey | | Religious | Free | Gwynedd | Llanelltyd | Merionethshire | SH721195 | 52.7581°N 3.8962°W | |
| Denbigh Castle | Castell Dinbych | Denbigh Castle | | Castle | Pay | Denbighshire | Denbigh | Denbighshire | SJ051657 | 53.1806°N 3.4206°W | |
| Denbigh Friary | Eglwys y Brodyr, Dinbych | Denbigh Friary Church | | Religious | Free | Denbighshire | Denbigh | Denbighshire | SJ059665 | 53.1878°N 3.4091°W | |
| Denbigh Town Walls | Muriau Tref Dinbych | Denbigh Town Walls | | Town Walls | Free | Denbighshire | Denbigh | Denbighshire | SJ052657 | 53.1808°N 3.4191°W | |
| Leicester's Church | Eglwys Iarll Leicester | Earl of Leicester's Church | | Religious | Free | Denbighshire | Denbigh | Denbighshire | SJ053659 | 53.1822°N 3.419°W | |
| St Hilary's Chapel | Capel Hilari | St Hilary's Chapel | | Religious | Free | Denbighshire | Denbigh | Denbighshire | SJ052659 | 53.1818°N 3.4198°W | |
| Derwen Churchyard Cross | Croes Derwen | Derwen Cross | | Religious | Free | Denbighshire | Derwen | Denbighshire | SJ070507 | 53.0457°N 3.3882°W | |
| Din Dryfol | Beddrod Siambr Din Dryfol | Din Dryfol Chambered Tomb | | Burial Chamber | Free | Isle of Anglesey | Aberffraw | Anglesey | SH395724 | 53.225°N 4.4048°W | |
| Din Lligwy | Pentref Brythonig-Rufeinig Din Llugwy | Din Llugwy Romano-British Village | | Hut Group | Free | Isle of Anglesey | Moelfre | Anglesey | SH497861 | 53.3508°N 4.2592°W | |
| Dinefwr Castle | Castell Dinefwr | | | Castle | Free | Carmarthenshire | Llandeilo | Carmarthenshire | SN622224 | 51.876776°N 4.018562°W | |
| Dolbadarn Castle | Castell Dolbadarn | | | Castle | Free | Gwynedd | Llanberis | Caernarfonshire | SH586598 | 53.1166°N 4.1143°W | |
| Dolforwyn Castle | Castell Dolforwyn | | | Castle | Free | Powys | Llandyssil | Montgomeryshire | SO151950 | 52.5464°N 3.2525°W | |
| Dolwyddelan Castle | Castell Dolwyddelan | | | Castle | Pay | Conwy | Dolwyddelan | Caernarfonshire | SH721523 | 53.0531°N 3.9084°W | |
| Dryslwyn Castle | Castell Dryslwyn | | | Castle | Free | Carmarthenshire | Llangathen | Carmarthenshire | SN554203 | 51.8632°N 4.1007°W | |
| Dyffryn Ardudwy | Beddrod Siambr Dyffryn Ardudwy | Dyffryn Ardudwy Chambered Tomb | | Burial Chamber | Free | Gwynedd | Dyffryn Ardudwy | Merionethshire | SH588228 | 52.7846°N 4.0937°W | |
| Dyfi Furnace | Ffwrnais Dyfi | Dyfi Furnace | | Industrial | Free | Ceredigion | Ysgubor-y-coed | Cardiganshire | SN684950 | 52.5378°N 3.9404°W | |
| Eliseg's Pillar | Piler Eliseg | Eliseg's Pillar | | Religious | Free | Denbighshire | Llantysilio | Denbighshire | SJ202445 | 52.9921°N 3.1893°W | |
| Ewenny Priory | Priordy Ewenni | Ewenni Priory | | Religious | Free | The Vale of Glamorgan | Ewenny | Glamorganshire | SS912778 | 51.4888°N 3.5676°W | |
| Ewloe Castle | Castell Ewloe | | | Castle | Free | Flintshire | Hawarden | Flintshire | SJ288675 | 53.2°N 3.0672°W | |
| Flint Castle | Castell y Fflint | | | Castle | Free | Flintshire | Flint | Flintshire | SJ246732 | 53.2511°N 3.1301°W | |
| Grosmont Castle | Castell y Grysmwnt | Grosmont Castle | | Castle | Free | Monmouthshire | Grosmont | Monmouthshire | SO405244 | 51.9154°N 2.8657°W | |
| Gwydir Uchaf Chapel | Capel Gwydir Uchaf | | | Religious | Free | Conwy | Trefriw | Caernarfonshire | SH794609 | 53.1319°N 3.8028°W | |
| Hafoty Medieval House | Tŷ Canoloesol Hafoty | Hafoty Medieval House | | Domestic | Free (Ext.) | Isle of Anglesey | Cwm Cadnant | Anglesey | SH562781 | 53.2809°N 4.1579°W | |
| Harlech Castle | Castell Harlech | | | Castle; World Heritage Site. | Pay | Gwynedd | Harlech | Merionethshire | SH581312 postcode LL46 2YH | 52.8602°N 4.1091°W | |
| Haverfordwest Priory | Priordy Hwlffordd | Haverfordwest Priory | | Religious | Free | Pembrokeshire | Haverfordwest | Pembrokeshire | SM956151 | 51.7976°N 4.9643°W | |
| Hen Gwrt Moated Site | Safle Ffosedig Ganoloesol Hen Gwrt | Hen Gwrt Medieval Moated Site | | Domestic | Free | Monmouthshire | Llantilio Crossenny | Monmouthshire | SO395151 | 51.8315°N 2.8782°W | |
| Holyhead Mountain Hut Circles | Pentref Cynhanesyddol Mynydd Twr | Holyhead Mountain Prehistoric Village | | Hut Group | Free | Isle of Anglesey | Trearddur | Anglesey | SH212820 | 53.3054°N 4.6838°W | |
| Kidwelly Castle | Castell Cydweli | Kidwelly Castle | | Castle | Pay | Carmarthenshire | Kidwelly | Carmarthenshire | SN409070 | 51.7398°N 4.3055°W | |
| Lamphey Bishop's Palace | Llys yr Esgob, Llandyfái | Bishop's Palace, Lamphey | | Religious | Free | Pembrokeshire | Lamphey | Pembrokeshire | SN018009 | 51.672°N 4.8668°W | |
| Laugharne Castle | Castell Talacharn | Laugharne Castle | | Castle | Pay | Carmarthenshire | Laugharne Township | Carmarthenshire | SN302107 | 51.7696°N 4.4621°W | |
| Llangar Church | Hen Eglwys Llangar | Llangar Old Church | | Religious | Pay | Denbighshire | Cynwyd | Merionethshire | SJ063424 | 52.9712°N 3.3959°W | |
| Llanmelin Wood Hill Fort | Bryngaer Coed Llanmelin | Llanmelin Wood Hillfort | | Hill Fort | Free | Monmouthshire | Caerwent | Monmouthshire | ST461925 | 51.6291°N 2.7794°W | |
| Llansteffan Castle | Castell Llansteffan | | | Castle | Free | Carmarthenshire | Llansteffan | Carmarthenshire | SN351101 | 51.7655°N 4.3908°W | |
| Llanthony Priory | Priordy Llanddewi Nant Hodni | Llanthony Priory | | Religious | Free | Monmouthshire | Crucorney | Monmouthshire | SO289278 | 51.9448°N 3.0364°W | |
| Llawhaden Castle | Castell Llanhuadain | Llawhaden Castle | | Castle | Free | Pembrokeshire | Llawhaden | Pembrokeshire | SN073175 | 51.8223°N 4.7976°W | |
| Lligwy Burial Chamber | Beddrod Siambr Llugwy | Llugwy Chambered Tomb | | Burial Chamber | Free | Isle of Anglesey | Moelfre | Anglesey | SH501860 | 53.3499°N 4.2529°W | |
| Loughor Castle | Castell Casllwchwr | Loughor Castle | | Castle | Free | Swansea | Llwchwr | Glamorganshire | SS564979 | 51.6622°N 4.0771°W | |
| Maen Achwyfan Cross | Croes Maen Achwyfan | Maen Achwyfan Cross | | Religious | Free | Flintshire | Whitford | Flintshire | SJ128787 | 53.2987°N 3.3085°W | |
| Margam Stones Museum | Amgueddfa Cerrig Margam | Margam Stones Museum | | Religious | Pay | Neath Port Talbot | Margam | Glamorganshire | SS801864 | 51.5637°N 3.7312°W | |
| Monmouth Castle | Castell Trefynwy | Monmouth Castle | | Castle | Free | Monmouthshire | Monmouth | Monmouthshire | SO506128 | 51.8125°N 2.7167°W | |
| Montgomery Castle | Castell Trefaldwyn | Montgomery Castle | | Castle | Free | Powys | Montgomery | Montgomeryshire | SO221967 | 52.5632°N 3.1501°W | |
| Neath Abbey | Abaty Nedd | Neath Abbey | | Religious | Free | Neath Port Talbot | Dyffryn Clydach | Glamorganshire | SS738974 | 51.6612°N 3.826°W | |
| Newcastle Castle | Y Castell Newydd | Newcastle Castle | | Castle | Free | Bridgend | Bridgend | Glamorganshire | SS902800 | 51.5089°N 3.583°W | |
| Newport Castle | Castell Casnewydd | Newport Castle | | Castle | Free | Newport | Stow Hill | Monmouthshire | ST311884 | 51.5908°N 2.9951°W | |
| Ogmore Castle | Castell Ogwr | Ogmore Castle | | Castle | Free | The Vale of Glamorgan | St Bride's Major | Glamorganshire | SS881769 | 51.4805°N 3.6115°W | |
| Old Beaupre Castle | Hen Gastell y Bewpyr | Old Beaupre Castle | | Castle | Free | The Vale of Glamorgan | Llanfair | Glamorganshire | ST008720 | 51.4385°N 3.4274°W | |
| Oxwich Castle | Castell Oxwich | | | Castle | Pay | Swansea | Penrice | Glamorganshire | SS497862 | 51.5555°N 4.1683°W | |
| Parc Cwm long cairn at Parc le Breos | Beddrod Siambr Parc le Breos | Parc le Breos Chambered Tomb | | Burial Chamber | Free | Swansea | Ilston | Glamorganshire | SS537898 | 51.5883°N 4.1128°W | |
| Penarth Fawr | Pennarth Fawr | | | Medieval House | ? | Gwynedd | Llanystumdwy | Caernarfonshire | SH419376 | 52.9132°N 4.3524°W | |
| Penmon Cross | Croes Penmon | Penmon Cross | | Religious | Free | Isle of Anglesey | Llangoed | Anglesey | SH630807 | 53.3058°N 4.0568°W | |
| Penmon Dovecote | Colomendy Penmon | Penmon Dovecote | | Domestic | Free | Isle of Anglesey | Llangoed | Anglesey | SH631807 | 53.3056°N 4.0557°W | |
| Penmon Priory | Priordy Penmon | Penmon Priory | | Religious | Free | Isle of Anglesey | Llangoed | Anglesey | SH630807 | 53.3055°N 4.0568°W | |
| St Seiriol's Well | Ffynnon Seiriol | St Seiriol's Well | | Religious | Free | Isle of Anglesey | Llangoed | Anglesey | SH630808 | 53.3064°N 4.0566°W | |
| Penrhos Feilw Standing Stones | Meini Hirion Penrhosfeilw | Penrhosfeilw Standing Stones | | Prehistoric | Free | Isle of Anglesey | Trearddur | Anglesey | SH227809 | 53.2957°N 4.6618°W | |
| Pentre Ifan | Beddrod Siambr Pentre Ifan | Pentre Ifan Chambered Tomb | | Burial Chamber | Free | Pembrokeshire | Nevern | Pembrokeshire | SN099370 | 51.9991°N 4.7701°W | |
| Plas Mawr, Conwy | Plas Mawr | | | Domestic | Pay | Conwy | Conwy | Caernarfonshire | SH780775 | 53.2812°N 3.83°W | |
| Pont Minllyn | Pont Minllyn | | | Bridge | Free | Gwynedd | Mawddwy | Merionethshire | SH859138 | 52.7106°N 3.6891°W | |
| Presaddfed Burial Chamber | Beddrod Siambr Presaddfed | Presaddfed Chambered Tomb | | Burial Chamber | Free | Isle of Anglesey | Bodedern | Anglesey | SH347808 | 53.2992°N 4.4809°W | |
| Raglan Castle | Castell Rhaglan | | | Castle | Pay | Monmouthshire | Raglan | Monmouthshire | SO417085 | 51.7702°N 2.8498°W | |
| Rhuddlan Castle | Castell Rhuddlan | | | Castle | Pay | Denbighshire | Rhuddlan | Flintshire | SJ024779 | 53.2891°N 3.465°W | |
| Rug Chapel | Capel y Rug | | | Religious | Pay | Denbighshire | Corwen | Merionethshire | SJ064438 | 52.9842°N 3.3942°W | |
| Runston Chapel | Eglwys Runston | Runston Church | | Religious | | Monmouthshire | Mathern | Monmouthshire | ST496915 | 51.6204°N 2.7293°W | |
| Segontium Roman Fort | Caer Rufeinig Segontium | Segontium Roman Fort | | Roman Fort | Free | Gwynedd | Caernarfon | Caernarfonshire | SH485624 | 53.1372°N 4.2662°W | |
| Skenfrith Castle | Castell Ynysgynwraidd | Skenfrith Castle | | Castle | Free | Monmouthshire | Llangattock-Vibon-Avel | Monmouthshire | SO456203 | 51.8786°N 2.7904°W | |
| St Cybi's Well | Ffynnon Gybi | St Cybi's Well | | Religious | Free | Gwynedd | Llangybi | Gwynedd | SH427413 | 52.945735°N 4.342090°W | |
| St Davids Bishop's Palace | Llys yr Esgob, Tyddewi | St Davids Bishop’s Palace | | Religious | Pay | Pembrokeshire | St Davids | Pembrokeshire | SM750254 | 51.8821°N 5.2708°W | |
| St Dogmaels Abbey | Abaty Llandudoch | St Dogmaels Abbey | | Religious | Free | Pembrokeshire | St Dogmaels | Pembrokeshire | SN164458 | 52.0806°N 4.6806°W | |
| St Lythans burial chamber | Beddrod Siambr Llwyneliddon | St Lythans Chambered Tomb | | Burial Chamber | Free | The Vale of Glamorgan | Wenvoe | Glamorganshire | ST100723 | 51.4426°N 3.2951°W | |
| Chapel of St Non | Capel Non | St Non's Chapel | | Religious | Free | Pembrokeshire | St Davids | Pembrokeshire | SM750243 | 51.8722°N 5.2689°W | |
| St Quentin's Castle, Llanblethian | Castell Llanfleiddan | Llanblethian Castle | | Castle | Free | The Vale of Glamorgan | Cowbridge with Llanblethian | Glamorganshire | SS989741 | 51.4576°N 3.4564°W | |
| St Winefride's Chapel and Well | Capel a Ffynnon Gwenffrewi | St Winefride's Chapel and Well | | Religious | Free | Flintshire | Holywell | Flintshire | SJ185762 | 53.2771°N 3.2236°W | |
| Strata Florida Abbey | Abaty Ystrad Fflur | Strata Florida Abbey | | Religious | Pay | Ceredigion | Ystrad Fflur | Cardiganshire | SN746657 | 52.2752°N 3.8383°W | |
| Swansea Castle | Castell Abertawe | Swansea Castle | | Castle | Free (External only) | Swansea | Swansea | Glamorganshire | SS657930 | 51.6205°N 3.9411°W | |
| Talley Abbey | Abaty Talyllychau | Talley Abbey | | Religious | Free | Carmarthenshire | Talley | Carmarthenshire | SN632327 | 51.9765°N 3.9922°W | |
| Tinkinswood | Beddrod Siambr Tinkinswood | Tinkinswood Chambered Tomb | | Burial Chamber | Free | The Vale of Glamorgan | St Nicholas and Bonvilston | Glamorganshire | ST092732 | 51.4513°N 3.3072°W | |
| Tintern Abbey | Abaty Tyndyrn | Tintern Abbey | | Religious | Pay | Monmouthshire | Tintern | Monmouthshire | SO533000 | 51.6969°N 2.6768°W | |
| Trefignath | Beddrod Siambr Trefignath | Trefignath Chambered Tomb | | Burial Chamber | Free | Isle of Anglesey | Trearddur | Anglesey | SH258805 | 53.2932°N 4.6142°W | |
| Tregwehelydd Standing Stone | Maen Hir Tregwehelydd | Tregwehelydd Standing Stone | | Prehistoric | Free | Isle of Anglesey | Tref Alaw | Anglesey | SH340831 | 53.3195°N 4.4926°W | |
| Tretower Castle | Castell a Llys Tretŵr | Tretower Castle and Court | | Castle | Pay | Powys | Llanfihangel Cwmdu | Brecknockshire | SO184212 | 51.8839°N 3.1862°W | |
| Tretower Court | Castell a Llys Tretŵr | Tretower Castle and Court | | Castle | Pay | Powys | Llanfihangel Cwmdu | Brecknockshire | SO185211 | 51.8832°N 3.1846°W | |
| Twthill | Mwnt y Castell, Twtil | Twtil, Castle Motte | | Castle Mound | Free | Denbighshire | Rhuddlan | Flintshire | SJ026776 | 53.2871°N 3.4619°W | |
| Tŷ Mawr Standing Stone | Maen Hir Tŷ Mawr | Tŷ Mawr Standing Stone | | Prehistoric | Free | Isle of Anglesey | Holyhead | Anglesey | SH253809 | 53.2967°N 4.6214°W | |
| Tŷ Newydd Burial Chamber | Beddrod Siambr Tŷ Newydd | Tŷ Newydd Chambered Tomb | | Burial Chamber | Free | Isle of Anglesey | Llanfaelog | Anglesey | SH344738 | 53.2359°N 4.4824°W | |
| Valle Crucis Abbey | Abaty Glyn y Groes | Valle Crucis Abbey | | Religious | Pay | Denbighshire | Llantysilio | Denbighshire | SJ204441 | 52.9888°N 3.1867°W | |
| Weobley Castle | Castell Weble | Weobley Castle | | Castle | Pay | Swansea | Llanrhidian Lower | Glamorganshire | SS478927 | 51.6128°N 4.1993°W | |
| White Castle | Y Castell Gwyn | White Castle | | Castle | Free | Monmouthshire | Llantilio Crossenny | Monmouthshire | SO379167 | 51.8461°N 2.9022°W | |
| Wiston Castle | Castell Cas-wis | Wiston Castle | | Castle | Free | Pembrokeshire | Wiston | Pembrokeshire | SN022181 | 51.8268°N 4.8711°W | |

== Location map ==
Map of Wales, showing the location of Cadw Properties

== See also ==
- List of National Trust properties in Wales
- Lists of scheduled monuments in Wales
