= Llugwy =

Llugwy (or Lligwy) may refer to a number of places and archaeological sites in Wales:

- River Llugwy (Afon Llugwy), in Snowdonia
- Ffynnon Llugwy, a lake in Snowdonia
- Lligwy Bay, in Anglesey
- Capel Lligwy, a ruined 12th-century Anglesey church
- Din Lligwy, an Iron Age hut circle in north east Anglesey
- Lligwy Burial Chamber, a Neolithic site in north east Anglesey
- Caer Llugwy (also known as Bryn-y-Gefeiliau), a Roman fort near Capel Curig
- Llugwy, Gwynedd, hamlet near Pennal, Gwynedd
- Llugwy Hall, ancestral Home of the Anwyl Family, near Pennal, Gwynedd
