= Lligwy (disambiguation) =

Lligwy is an electoral ward of north east Anglesey.

It may also refer to:

- Capel Lligwy
- Din Lligwy
- Lligwy Bay
- Lligwy Burial Chamber

in this area.

Note that the River Llugwy is on mainland Wales.
