= Fishing weir =

Obstruction placed in tidal waters to trap fish

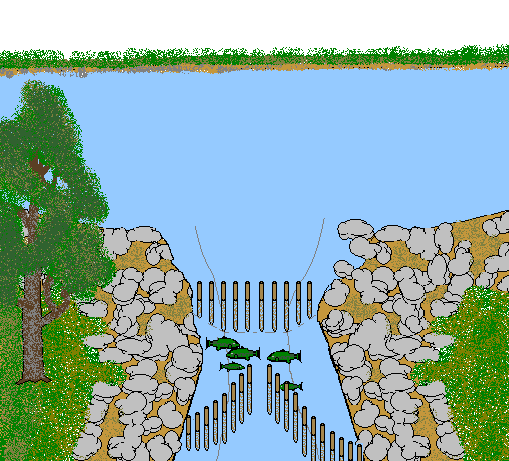
Weir-type fish trap

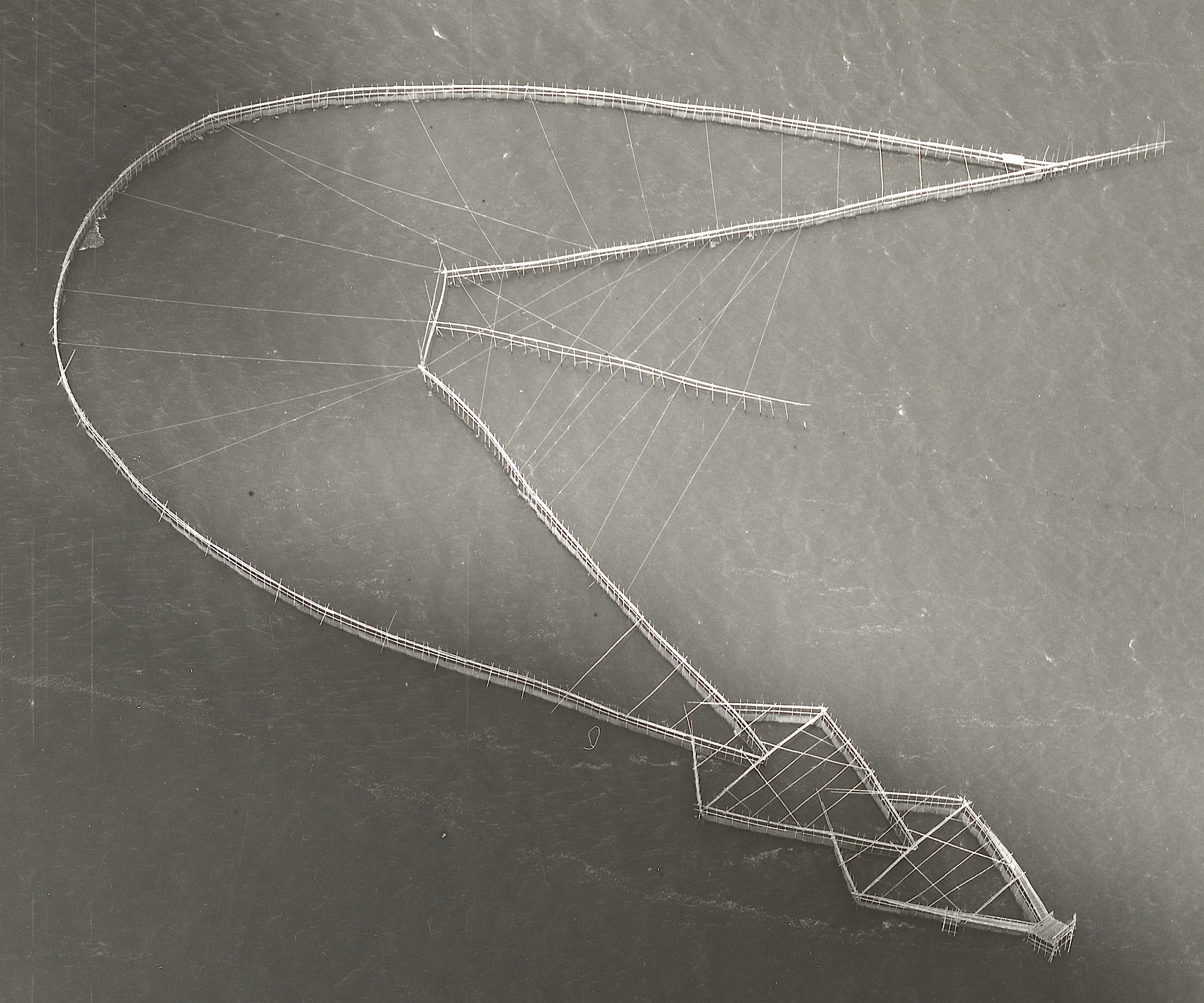
A tidal fish corral in Manila Bay, Philippines (c. 1940s)

A fishing weir, fish weir, fishgarth or kiddle is an obstruction placed in tidal waters, or wholly or partially across a river, to direct the passage of, or trap, fish. A weir may be used to trap marine fish in the intertidal zone as the tide recedes, fish such as salmon as they attempt to swim upstream to breed in a river, or eels as they migrate downstream. Alternatively, fish weirs can be used to channel fish to a particular location, such as to a fish ladder. Weirs were traditionally built from wood or stones. The use of fishing weirs as fish traps probably dates back prior to the emergence of modern humans, and have since been used by many societies around the world.

In the Philippines, specific indigenous fishing weirs (a version of the ancient Austronesian stone fish weirs) are also known in English as fish corrals and barrier nets.

== Etymology ==
The English word 'weir' comes from the Anglo-Saxon wer, one meaning of which is a device to trap fish.

== By region ==
=== Africa ===
A line of stones dating to the Acheulean in Kenya may have been a stone tidal weir in a prehistoric lake, which if true would make this technology older than modern humans.

=== Americas ===
==== North America ====
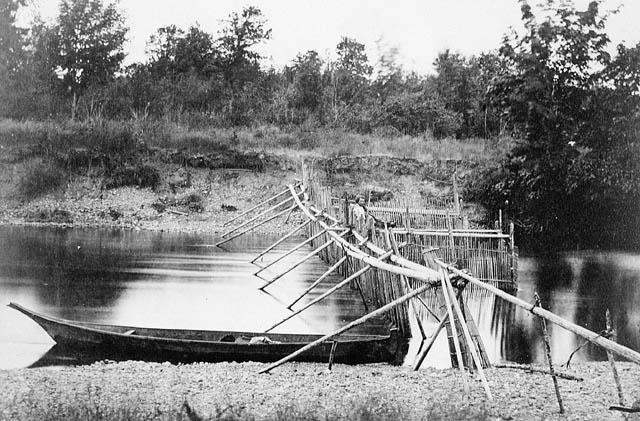
Salmon weir at Quamichan Village on the Cowichan River, Vancouver Island, c. 1866

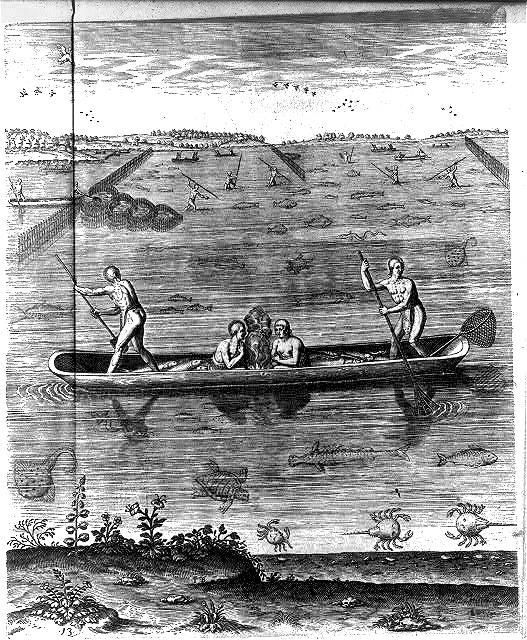
Algonquin fishing with weir and spears in a dugout canoe. After a drawing by colonist John White (1585).

In September 2014 researchers from University of Victoria investigated what may turn out to be a 14,000-year-old fish weir in 120 ft (37 m) of water off the coast of Haida Gwaii, British Columbia.

In Virginia, the Native Americans built V-shaped stone weirs in the Potomac River and James River. These were described in 1705 in The History and Present State of Virginia, In Four Parts by Robert Beverley Jr:

At the falls of the Rivers, where the Water is shallow, and the Current strong, the Indians use another kind of Weir thus made. They make a Dam of loose stone where of there is plenty on hand, quite across the River, leaving One, Two or more Spaces or Tunnels, for the water to pass thro': at the Mouth of which they set a Pot of Reeds, Wove in form of a Cone, whose Base is about Three Foot, and in Perpendicular Ten, into which the Swiftness of the Current carries the Fish, and wedges them in fast, that they cannot possibly return.

This practice was taken up by the early settlers but the Maryland General Assembly ordered the weirs to be destroyed on the Potomac in 1768. Between 1768 and 1828 considerable efforts were made to destroy fish weirs that were an obstruction to navigation and from the mid-1800s, those that were assumed to be detrimental to sports fishing.

In the Back Bay area of Boston, Massachusetts, wooden stake remains of the Boylston Street Fishweir have been documented during excavations for subway tunnels and building foundations. The Boylston Street Fishweir was actually a series of fish weirs built and maintained near the tidal shoreline between 3,700 and 5,200 years ago.

Natives in Nova Scotia use weirs that stretch across the entire river to retain shad during their seasonal runs up the Shubenacadie, Nine Mile, and Stewiacke rivers, and use nets to scoop the trapped fish. Various weir patterns were used on tidal waters to retain a variety of different species, which are still used today. V-shaped weirs with circular formations to hold the fish during high tides are used on the Bay of Fundy to fish herring, which follow the flow of water. Similar V-shaped weirs are also used in British Columbia to corral salmon to the end of the "V" during the changing of the tides.

The Cree of the Hudson Bay Lowlands used weirs consisting of a fence of poles and a trap across fast flowing rivers. The fish were channelled by the poles up a ramp and into a box-like structure made of poles lashed together. The top of the ramp remained below the surface of the water but slightly above the top of the box so that the flow of the water and the overhang of the ramp stopped the fish from escaping from the box. The fish were then scooped out of the box with a dip net.

==== South America ====
A large series of fish weirs, canals and artificial islands was built by an unknown pre-Columbian culture in the Baures region of Bolivia, part of the Llanos de Moxos. These earthworks cover over 500 square kilometres (190 mi^{2}), and appear to have supported a large and dense population around 3000 BCE.

Stone fish weirs were in use 6,000 years ago in Chiloé Island off the coast of Chile.

=== Asia and Oceania ===
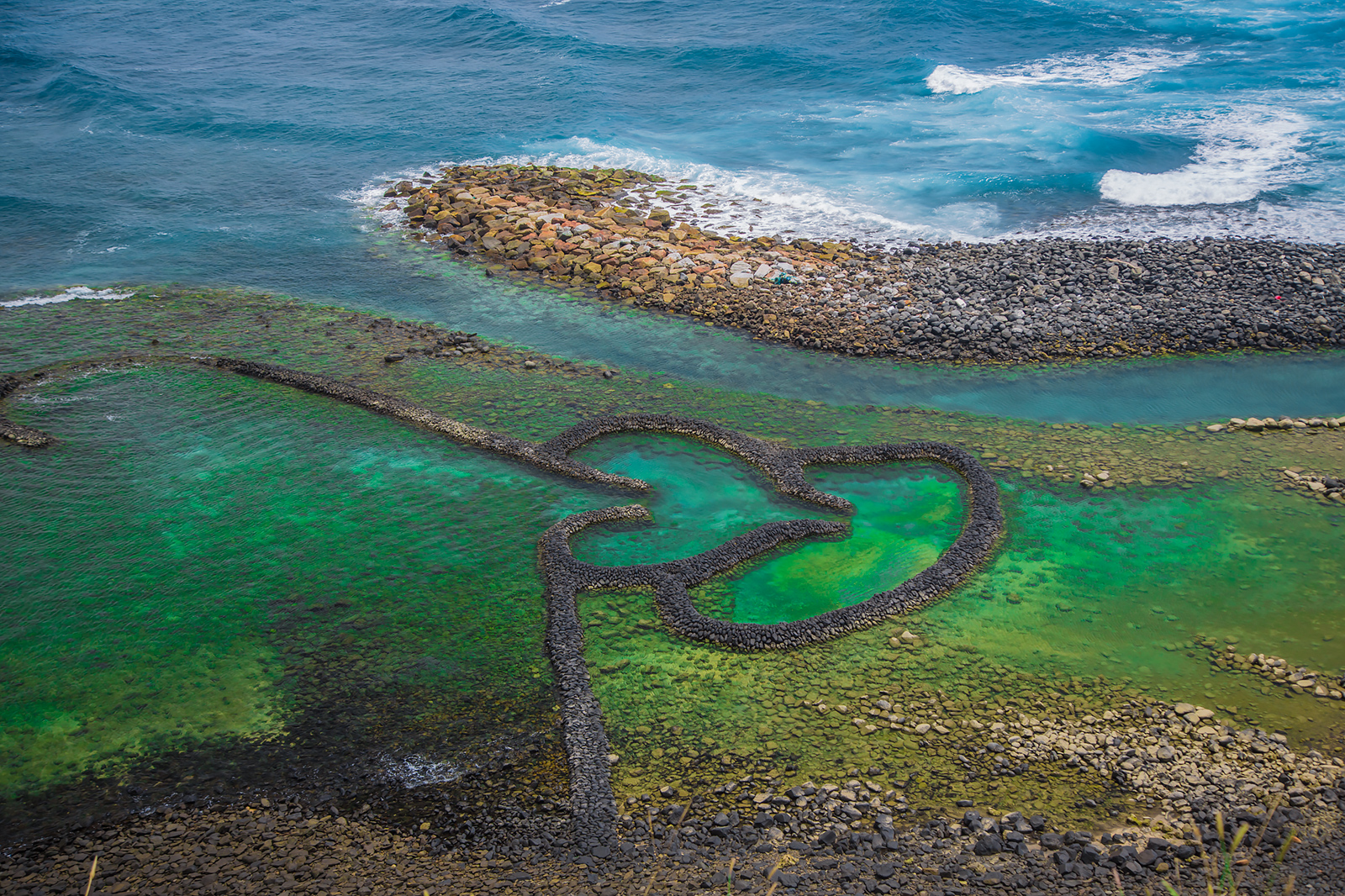
The Double-Heart of Stacked Stones fishing weir in Penghu, Taiwan

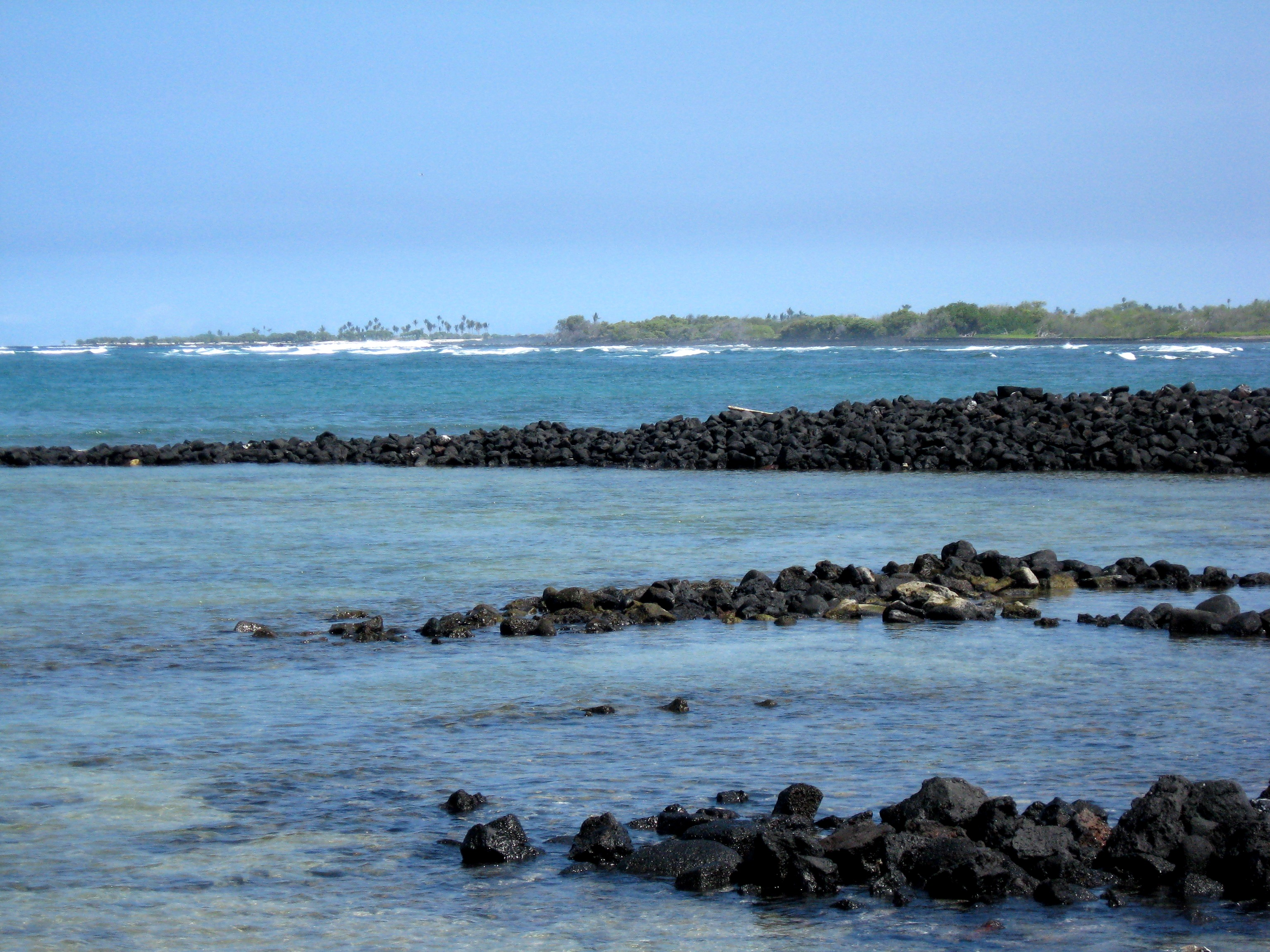
The ancient 'Ai'opio stone fish trap in Honokohau, Hawaii

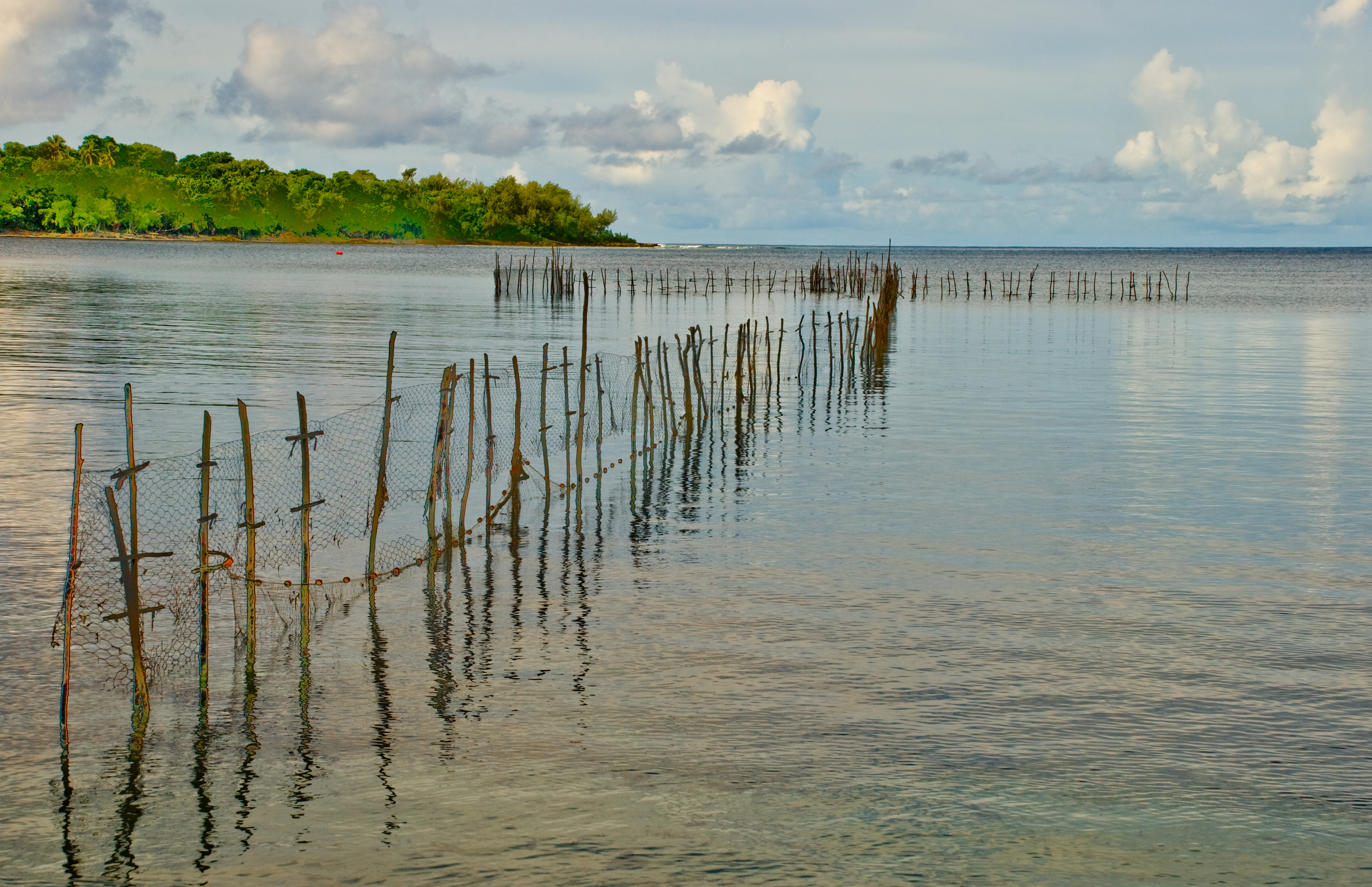
A fishing weir in Efate, Vanuatu

Tidal stone fish weirs are one of the ancestral fishing technologies of the seafaring Austronesian peoples. They are found on tidal estuaries and shallow coastal waters throughout regions settled by Austronesians during the Austronesian expansion (c. 3000 to 1500 BCE). They are very similar in shape and construction throughout. They come in several variants, the most basic of which is the semicircular shape (with various examples being described as horseshoe-shaped, arrow-shaped, boomerang-shaped, or heart-shaped), with the opening facing seaward (the direction of the ebb tide). They also sometimes include linear or triangular fish corridors, creating a tennis racket-like or keyhole-like shape that guides the fish into the weir opening. Some variants also include a fish labyrinth at the tips that serves as the fish trap. The weirs can also be nested into each other or extended with multiple short chambers for subdividing the communal fish catch. In some regions they have also been adopted into fish pens or fish ponds or use more perishable materials like bamboo, brushwood, and netting.

Austronesian stone fish weirs are found in the highest concentrations in Penghu Island in Taiwan, the Philippines, and all throughout Micronesia. They are also prevalent in eastern Indonesia, Melanesia, and Polynesia. Around 500 stone weirs survive in Taiwan, and millions of stone weirs used to exist through all of the islands of Micronesia. They are known as atob in the Visayas Islands of the Philippines, maai in Chuuk, aech in Yap, loko ‘umeiki in Hawaii, and pā in New Zealand, among other names. The oldest known example of a stone fish weir in Taiwan was constructed by the indigenous Taokas people in Miaoli County. Most stone fish weirs are believed to also be ancient, but few studies have been conducted into their antiquity as they are difficult to determine due to being continually rebuilt in the same location.

The technology of tidal stone fish weirs has also spread to neighboring regions when Taiwan came under the jurisdiction of China and Imperial Japan in recent centuries. They are known as ishihibi or sukki in Kyushu, kaki in the Ryukyu Islands; dŏksal, sŏkpangryŏm, sŏkchŏn, or wŏn in South Korea (particularly Jeju Island); and chioh-ho in Taiwan.

The Han Chinese also had separate ancient fish weir techniques, known as hu, which use bamboo gates or "curtains" in river estuaries. These date back to at least the 7th century in China.

=== Europe ===
In medieval Europe, large fishing weir structures were constructed from wood posts and wattle fences. V-shaped structures in rivers could be as long as 60 m (200 ft) and worked by directing fish towards fish traps or nets. Such weirs were frequently the cause of disputes between various classes of river users and tenants of neighbouring land. Basket weir fish traps are shown in medieval illustrations and surviving examples have been found. Basket weirs are about 2 m (6.6 ft) long and comprise two wicker cones, one inside the other—easy for fish to get into but difficult to escape.

==== Great Britain ====
In Great Britain the traditional form was one or more rock weirs constructed in tidal races or on a sandy beach, with a small gap that could be blocked by wattle fences when the tide turned to flow out again.

===== Wales =====
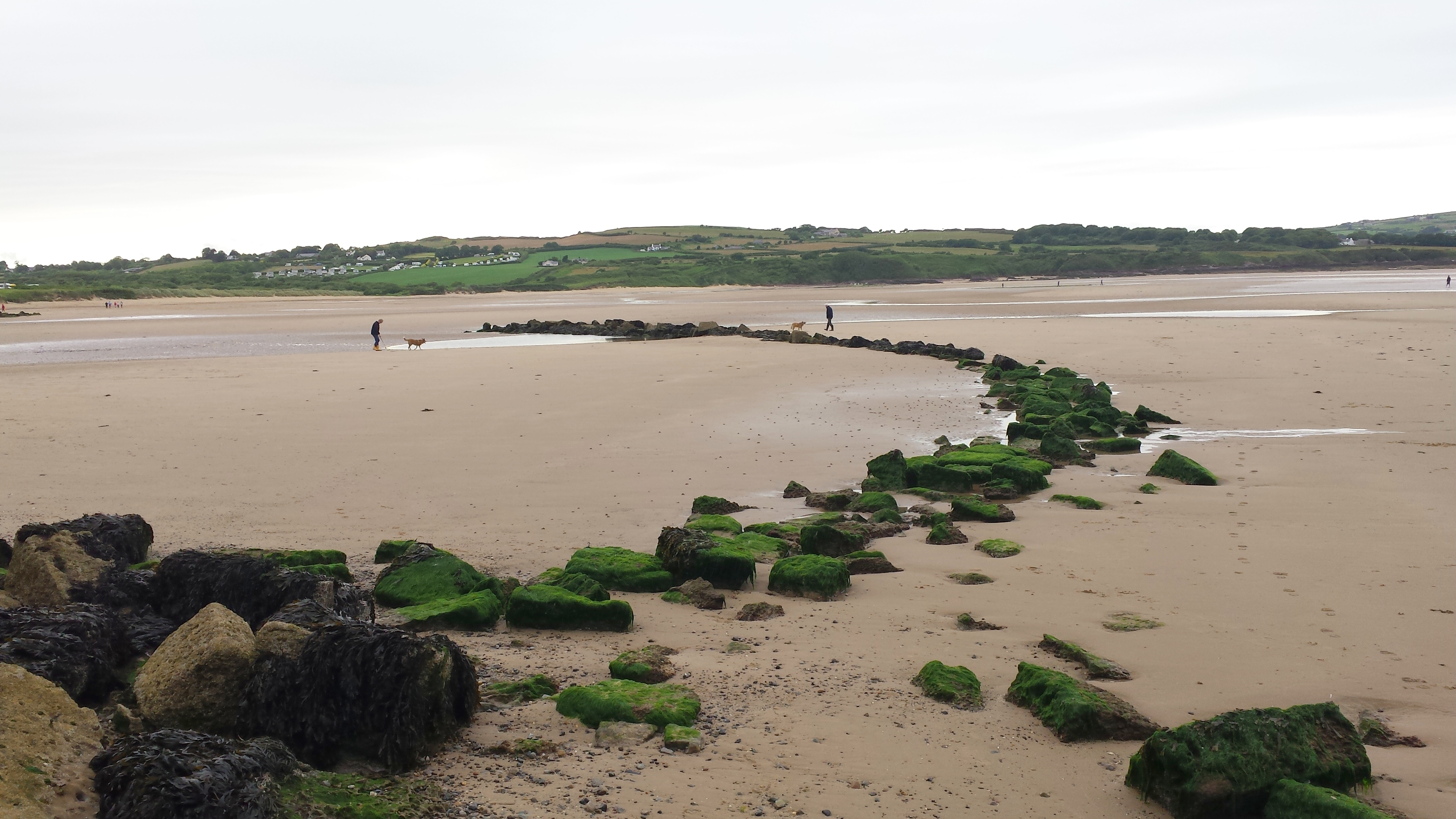
Remains of a medieval fish weir just above the low water mark at Traeth Lligwy, Anglesey

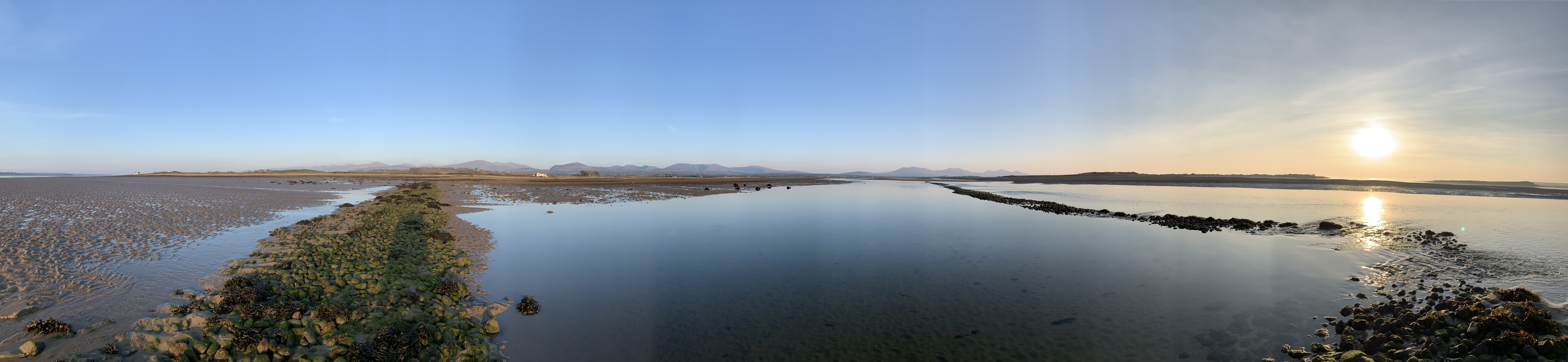
Gorad Gwyrfai fish weir near Caernarfon, Wales

Surviving examples, but no longer in use, can be seen in the Menai Strait, with the best preserved examples to be found at Ynys Gored Goch (Red Weir Island) dating back to around 1842. Also surviving are 'goredi' (originally twelve in number) on the beach at Aberarth, Ceredigion. Another ancient example was at Rhos Fynach in North Wales, which survived in use until World War I. The medieval fish weir at Traeth Lligwy, Moelfre, Anglesey was scheduled as an Ancient Monument in 2002.

===== England =====
Fish weirs were an obstacle to shipping and a threat to fish stocks, for which reasons over the course of history several attempts were made to control their proliferation. The Magna Carta of 1215 includes a clause embodying the barons' demands for the removal of the king's weirs and others:

All fish-weirs shall be removed from the Thames, the Medway, and throughout the whole of England, except on the sea coast.

A statute was passed during the reign of King Edward III (1327–1377) and was reaffirmed by King Edward IV in 1472 A further regulation was enacted under King Henry VIII, apparently at the instigation of Thomas Cromwell, when in 1535 commissioners were appointed in each county to oversee the "putting-down" of weirs. The words of the commission were as follows:

All weirs noisome to the passage of ships or boats to the hurt of passages or ways and causeys (i.e. causeways) shall be pulled down and those that be occasion of drowning of any lands or pastures by stopping of waters and also those that are the destruction of the increase of fish, by the discretion of the commissioners, so that if any of the before-mentioned depend or may grow by reason of the same weir then there is no redemption but to pull them down, although the same weirs have stood since 500 years before the Conquest.

The king did not exempt himself from the regulation and by the destruction of royal weirs lost 500 marks in annual income. The Lisle Papers provide a detailed contemporary narrative of the struggle of the owners of the weir at Umberleigh in Devon to be exempted from this 1535 regulation. The Salmon Fishery Act 1861 (24 & 25 Vict. c. 109) (relevant provisions re-enacted since) bans their use except wherever their almost continuous use can be traced to before the Magna Carta (1215).

==== Ireland ====
In Ireland, discoveries of fish traps associated with weirs have been dated to 8,000 years ago. Stone tidal weirs were used around the world and by 1707, 160 such structures, some of which reached 360 metres in length, were in use along the coast of the Shimabara Peninsula of Japan.

== Gallery ==
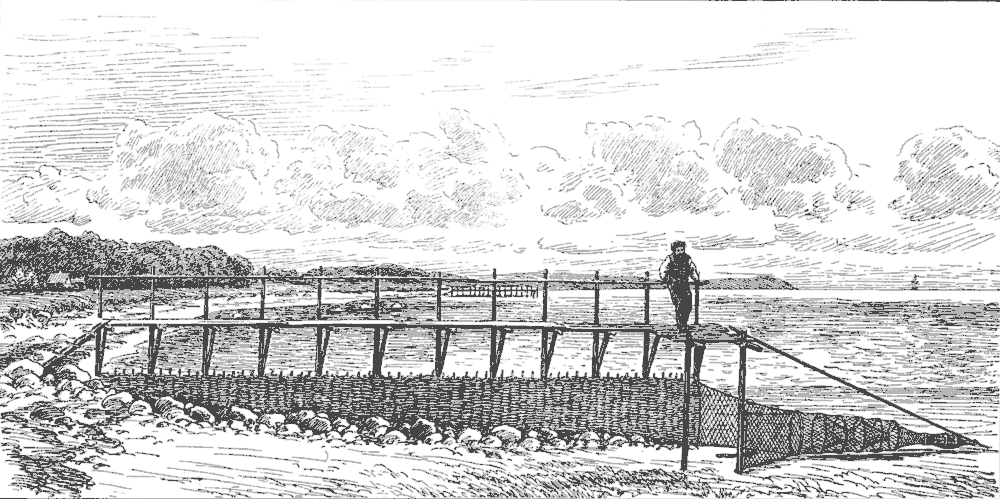
19th-century fishing weir used to trap eels on the Danish coast

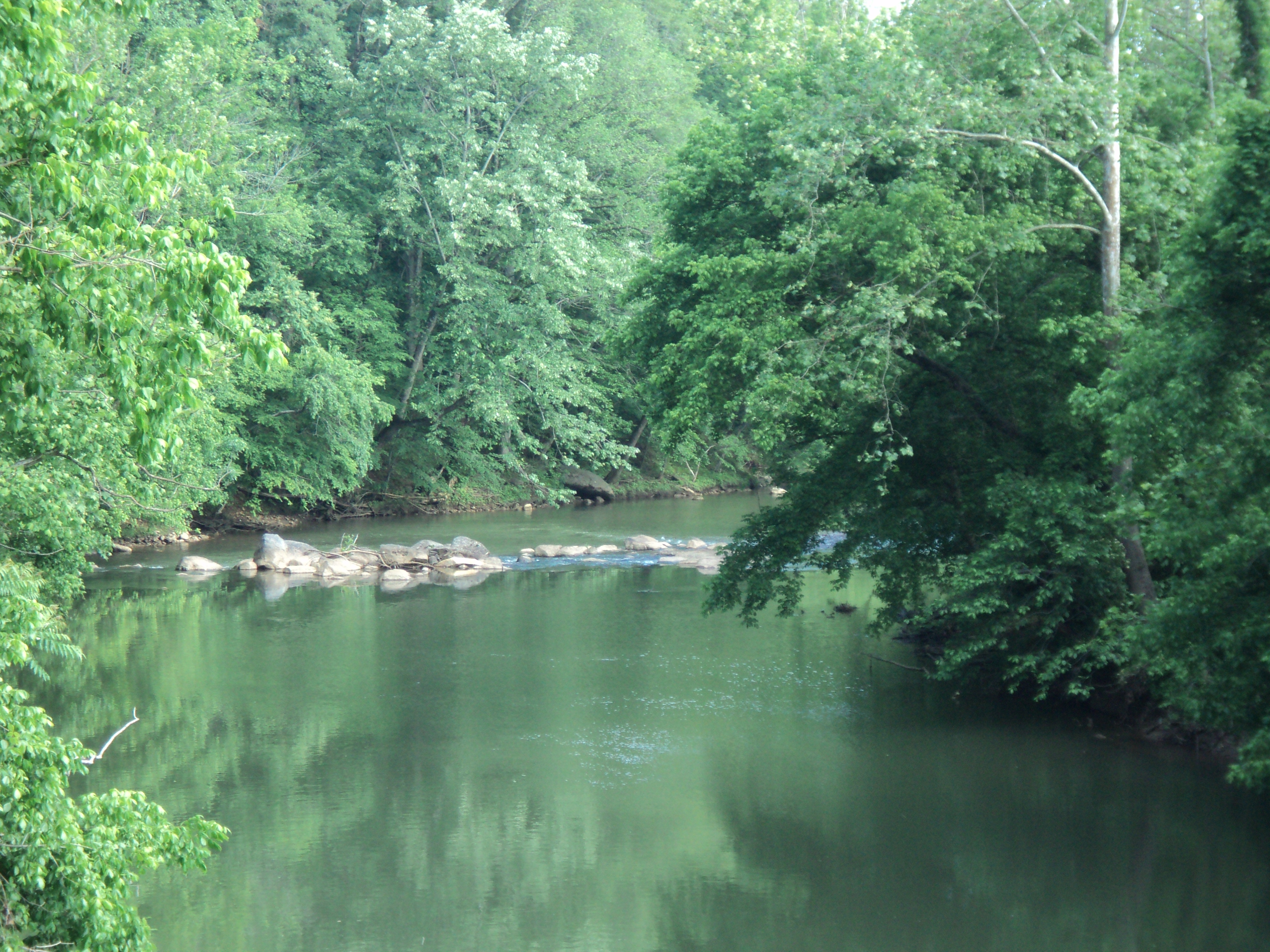
The Martinsville Fish Dam Virginia, a historic Native American Indian fishing weir built with rocks

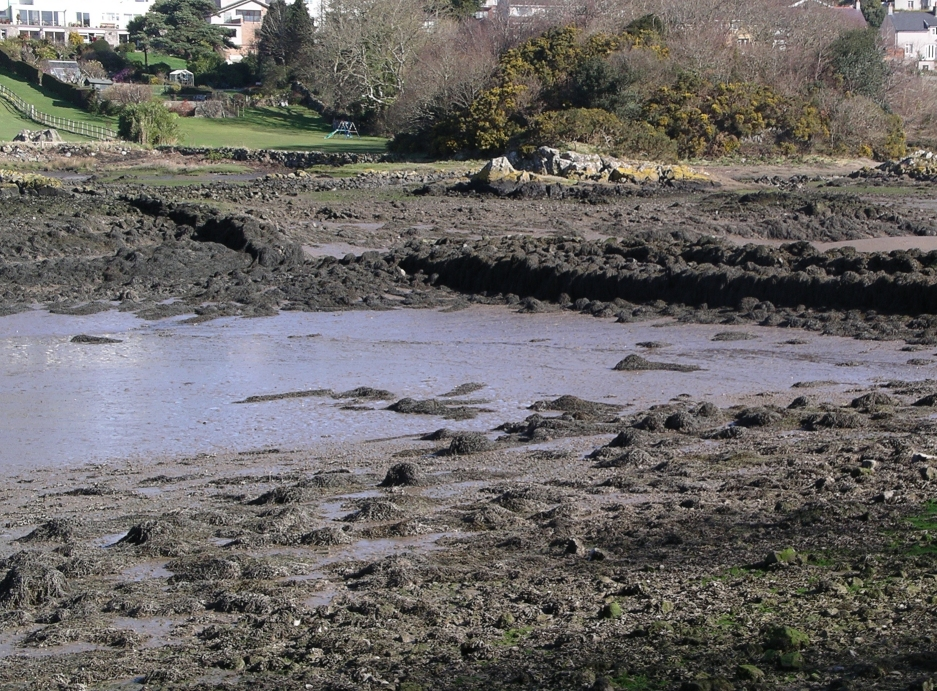
Remains of an ancient stone fishing weir in the tidal Menai Strait in Wales

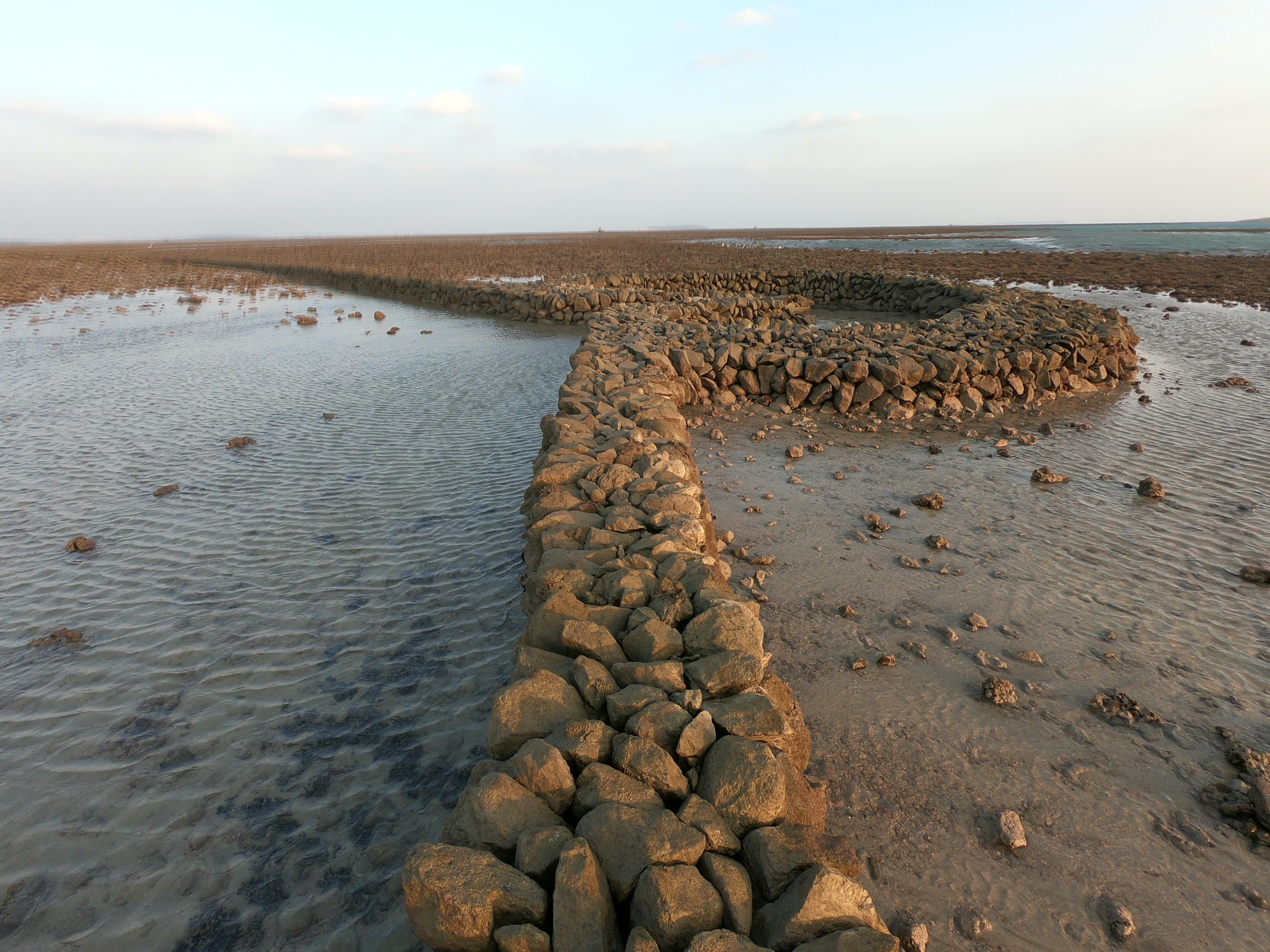
Fishing weir, Penghu County

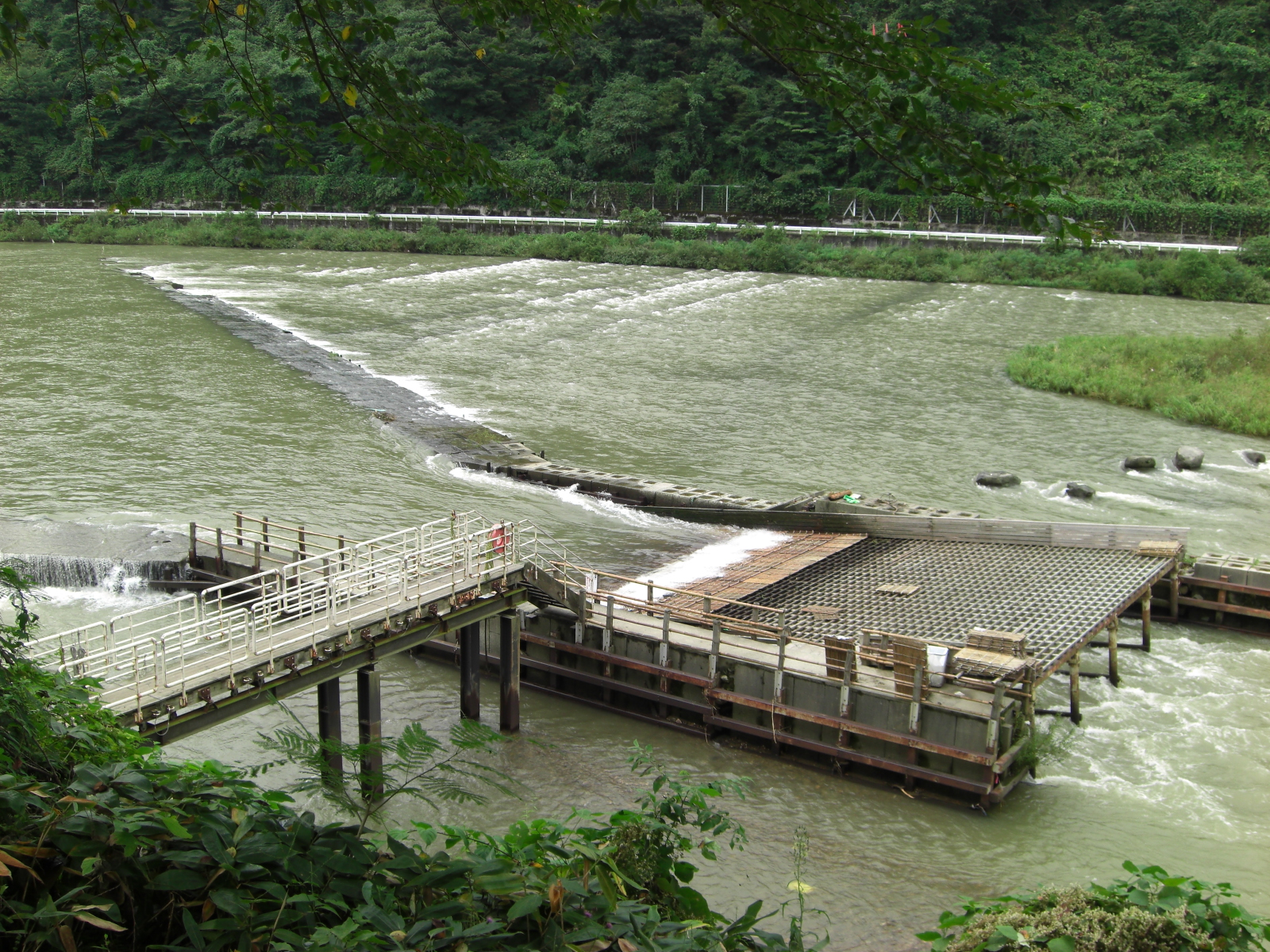
Fishing weir on the rapidly flowing Mogami River in Japan

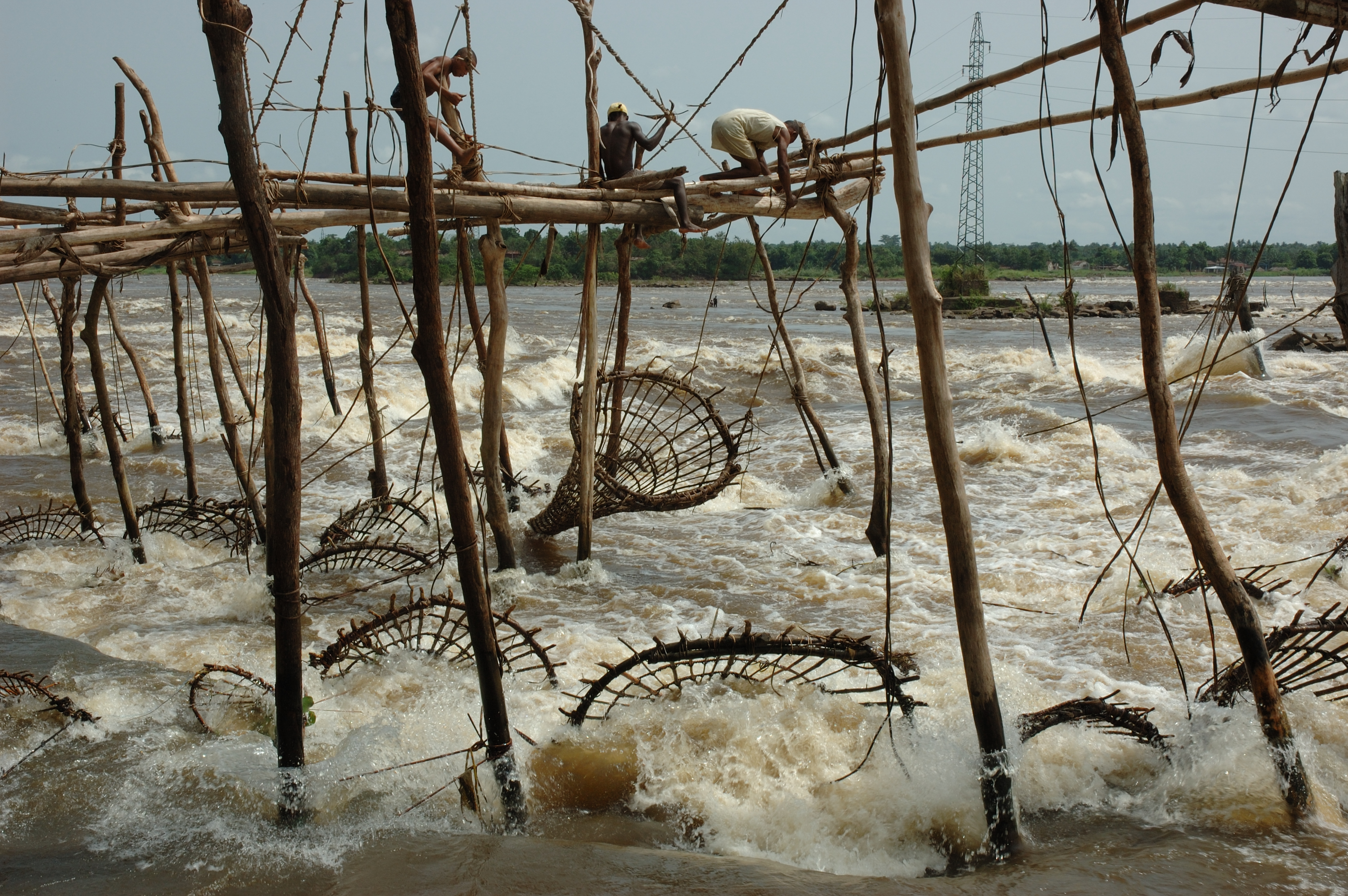
Fishing weirs using baskets at a river waterfall, Democratic Republic of the Congo

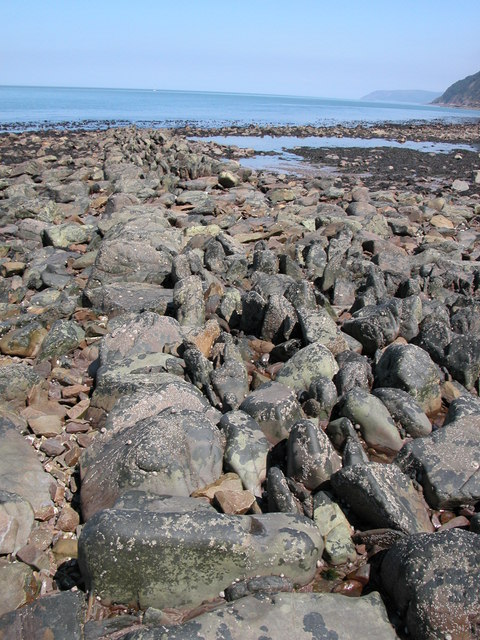
Ancient V-shaped fishing weir at Countisbury Cove, Somerset

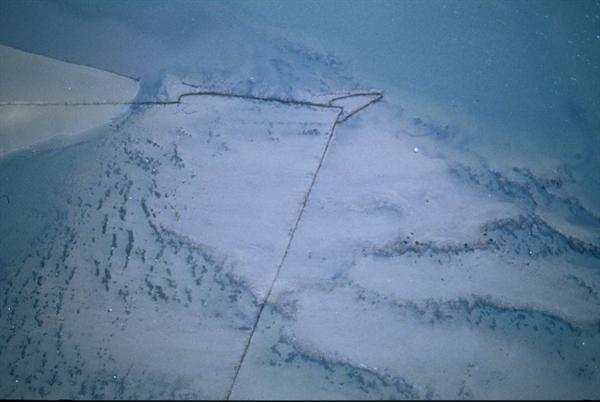
Modern anchovy weir in the Oosterschelde near Bergen op Zoom in the Netherlands (aerial view)

== See also ==
- Desert kite
- Fish screen
- Mnjikaning Fish Weirs
- Tailrace fishing
- Weir
