= Lligwy Bay =

Bay in Anglesey, Wales, United Kingdom

Coordinates: 53.36204°N 4.26010°W

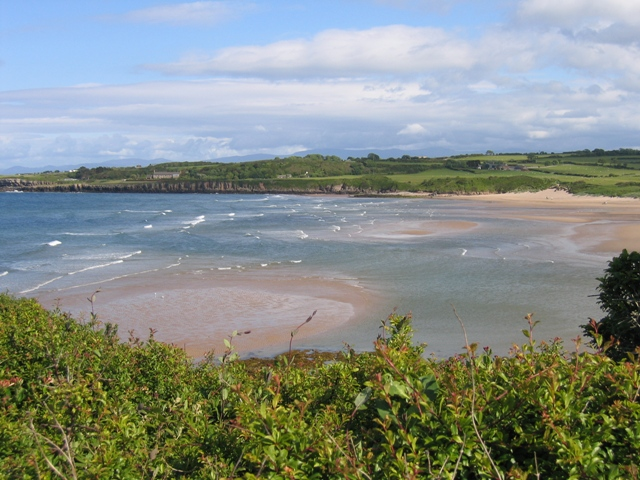
Looking south-east over Lligwy Beach

Lligwy Bay (Welsh: Traeth Lligwy) is a bay of the Welsh island of Anglesey.

It is on the north east of the island, to the north of the village of Moelfre. It was the site, in October 1859, of the loss of the steam clipper Royal Charter with a loss of life in excess of 450.

The bay is very popular with windsurfers and other wind-powered watersport enthusiasts. There is a pay and display car park at the end of the access road from the A5025 at Brynrefail.

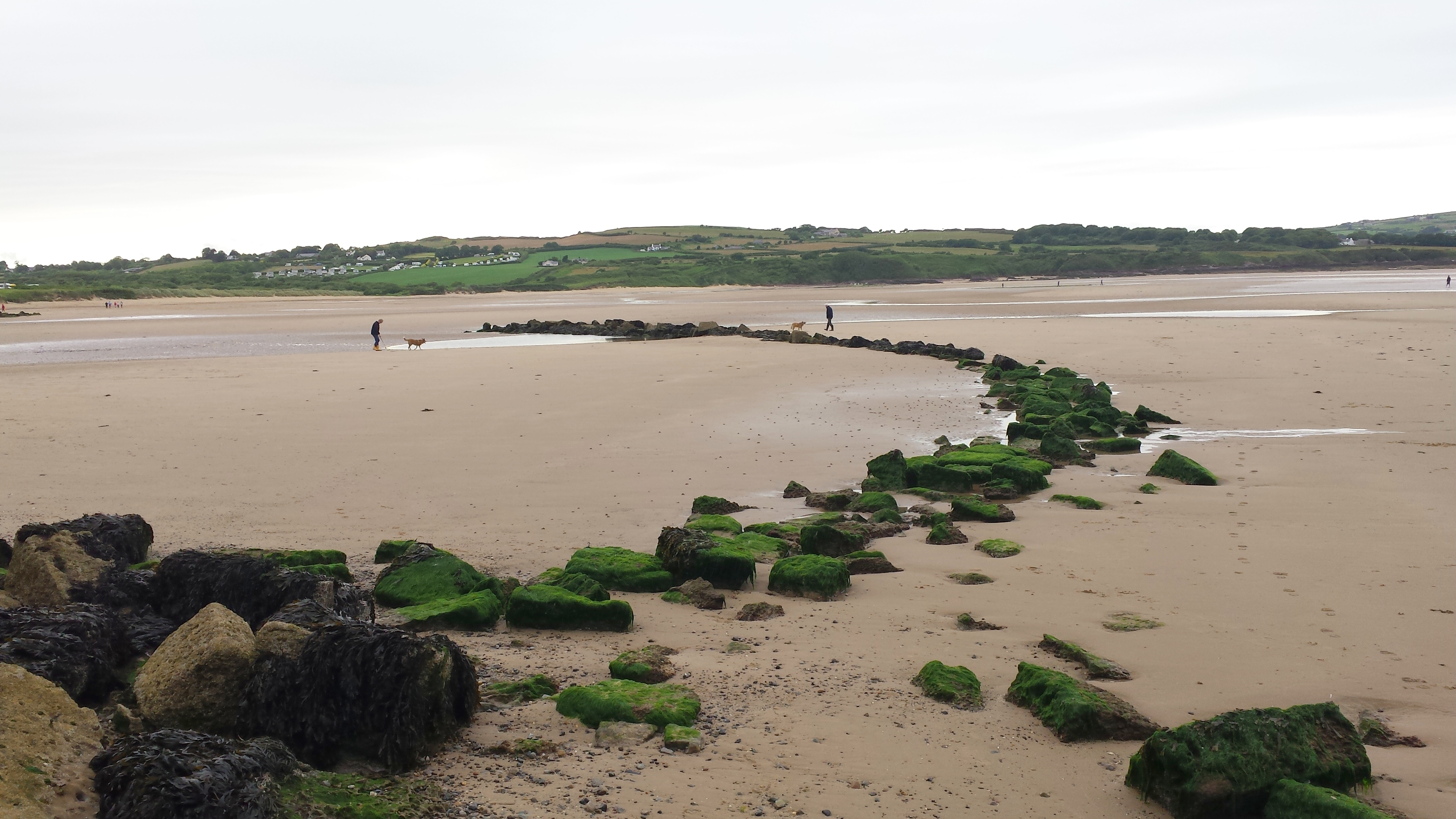
Remains of the medieval fish weir just above the low water mark

The beach is the site of a medieval fish weir, which was scheduled as an Ancient Monument in 2002.

== See also ==
- Capel Lligwy
- Din Lligwy
- Lligwy Burial Chamber
- Royal Charter Storm
