= Aled Eames =

Welsh historian, 1921–1996

Aled Eames (29 July 1921 – 7 March 1996) was a Welsh historian and author. He wrote primarily on Welsh maritime history.

== Life and career ==
Eames, born in Llandudno, attended a local grammar school. He joined the Royal Navy in the Second World War, reached the rank of lieutenant and was twice mentioned in despatches. He then read history at the University College of North Wales and obtained a first-class degree. The college was the forerunner of Bangor University, whose staff he joined as an education lecturer and as warden of Neuadd Reichel hall of residence for twenty years.

In 1955 Eames was awarded the Prince Llywelyn ap Gruffydd Prize for his thesis "Sea Power and Welsh History during the Reign of Charles I". His research interests focused on Welsh merchant shipping in the 18th and 19th centuries. He visited the Canadian Maritime Provinces and parts of the United States on a study trip in 1981.

Eames was one of the founders of the annual Cymru a'r Mor/Maritime Wales in 1976 and was one of the editors of the Journal of the Merioneth Historical and Record Society. He also worked on television, for instance on the BBC2 series Tradewinds (1986) and several Welsh-language programmes.

Eames was married first to Hazel Phillips, with whom he had two daughters, but the marriage was dissolved. He later married Freda Gale, with whom he had a son and two daughters. He lived for many years at Moelfre.

Eames died on 7 or 8 March 1996, aged 74, after a long illness. The biennial Aled Eames Memorial Lecture was instituted in his memory at Moelfre.

== Book publications ==
Bibliographic information augmented from British Library catalogues:

- Ships and Seamen of Anglesey, 1558–1918: Studies in Maritime and Local History, 1973, c. 1981
- Porthmadog Ships, with Emrys Hughes, 1975
- Llongau a llongwyr Gwynedd, 1976, in English: Ships and Seamen of Gwynedd, 1976
- Meistri'r Moroedd, 1978
- O Bwllheli i bendraw'r byd : hanes hen longau Pwllheli a'r cylch, 1979
- Ship Master: The Life and Letters of Capt. Robert Thomas of Llandwrog and Liverpool 1843–1903, c. 1980
- Machlud Hwyliau'r Cymry (The Twilight of Welsh Sail), 1984
- Gwraig y Capten, 1984, translated into English by Elinor Ellis as The Captain's Wife, 2016
- Ventures in Sail: Aspects of the Maritime History of Gwynedd, 1840–1914, and the Liverpool Connection, c. 1987
- Heb long wrth y cei: hen borthladdoedd diflanedig Cymru (No Ship at the Quay. The Old Lost Ports of Wales), 1989, in English Shrouded quays: the lost ports of Wales, 1991
- Y Fordaith Bell, 1993
