= Tŷ Newydd Burial Chamber =

Neolithic dolmen in Wales

Tŷ Newydd
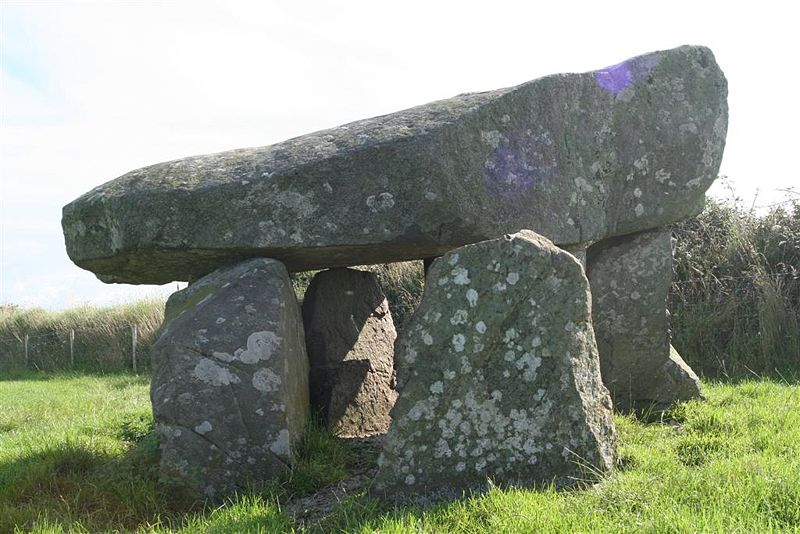

- Location within Anglesey
- 53.23599°N 4.48243°W
- Type: Dolmen
- Periods: Neolithic
- Location: Anglesey
- OS grid reference: SH344738

Site notes
- Owner: Cadw

Tŷ Newydd Burial Chamber is a Neolithic dolmen located northeast of the village of Llanfaelog on the Isle of Anglesey in Wales. It is located near Tŷ Newydd farm, and is in the care of Cadw.

== Description ==
Tŷ Newydd burial chamber is a ruined megalithic dolmen set up on a natural outcrop and would originally have been covered with a mound or cairn. The capstone measures 4.0 metres by 1.8 metres and is up to 1.2 metres thick. The capstone is cracked and rests on three of the four remaining uprights.

== Excavations ==
The chamber was excavated in August 1935 by Charles Phillips. The chamber was found to be about 2.8 metres by 1.2 metres, and its area was defined by a spread of charcoal with a hearth at the eastern end, where there was thought to have been a second chamber or passage. The finds included five flint flakes, a burnt flint arrowhead, a small chip from a polished flint axe, and nine small fragments of pottery. Phillips believed that the pottery fragments were from the Beaker culture, and thus might represent Bronze Age reuse of an earlier Neolithic monument.
