= Moelfre, Anglesey =

Village and community in Anglesey, Wales

Moelfre
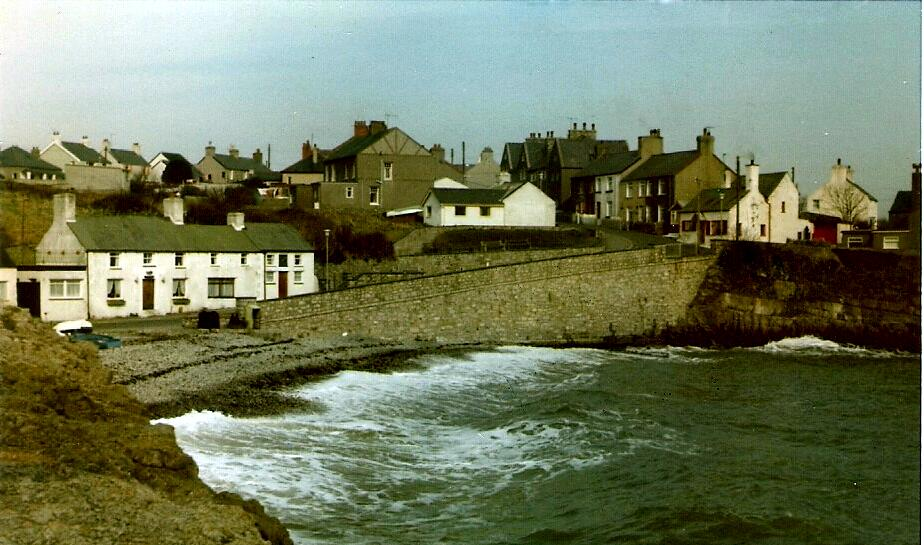
- The harbour-front and seawall, circa 1966

- Location within Anglesey
- Population: 1,064
- OS grid reference: SH5186
- Principal area: Anglesey
- Preserved county: Gwynedd
- Country: Wales
- Sovereign state: United Kingdom
- Post town: MOELFRE
- Postcode district: LL72
- Police: North Wales
- Fire: North Wales
- Ambulance: Welsh
- UK Parliament: Ynys Môn
- Senedd Cymru – Welsh Parliament: Bangor Conwy Môn
- List of places UK Wales Anglesey 53.35351°N 4.2356°W Map of the community

Moelfre ([ˈmɔɨ̯lvrɛ]) is a village, a community and, until 2012, an electoral ward on the north-east coast of the Isle of Anglesey in Wales. The community area covers the village and harbour, and several smaller, dispersed settlements. It includes six scheduled Iron Age hut groups and many other sites of archaeological interest. The harbour was formerly a local fishing port; a lifeboat station has been based here since 1854. Among many shipwrecks off the coast was that of the Royal Charter in 1859. Near the modernised lifeboat station is the RNLI Seawatch Centre. The coastline includes a rocky headland north of the village and a large sandy beach at Lligwy Bay, both traversed by the Anglesey Coastal Path. The 2011 census measured the village population as 710. It was estimated at 614 in 2019.

== Location ==
The village of Moelfre wraps around a small harbour sheltered from the north by a headland and the rocky island of Ynys Moelfre. Also within Moelfre Community are the more dispersed settlements of Marian-glas, Llanallgo, Brynrefail and Mynydd Bodafon. It had a population of 1,064 at the time of the 2011 UK census. The village today has 502 households and 5 per cent unemployment. The Royal Mail postcode begins LL72. The main road through the community is the A5025, which is a five-minute drive from the village. The nearest mainline railway stations are in Bangor and Llanfairpwllgwyngyll. These can be reached in under half an hour by bus services which run through the village.

== Heritage ==
The meaning of the Welsh name is "bald" or "barren hill", which refers to the land behind the village, as seen from the sea. The name has the same origin as that of the Malvern Hills.

=== Archaeology ===
Map of Moelfre Community, showing the location of the Scheduled Monuments. Three of the monuments are in the care of Cadw..

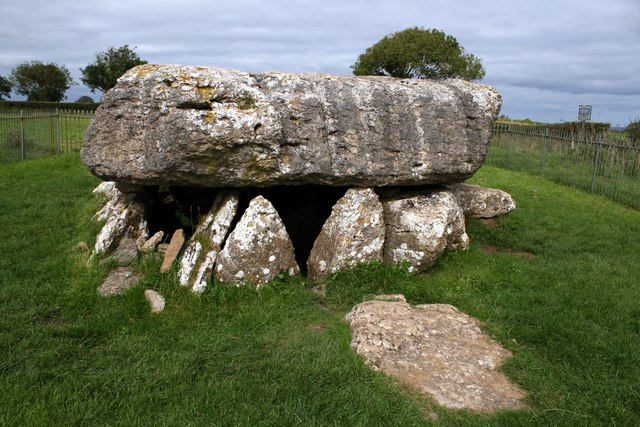
Lligwy Burial Chamber 2

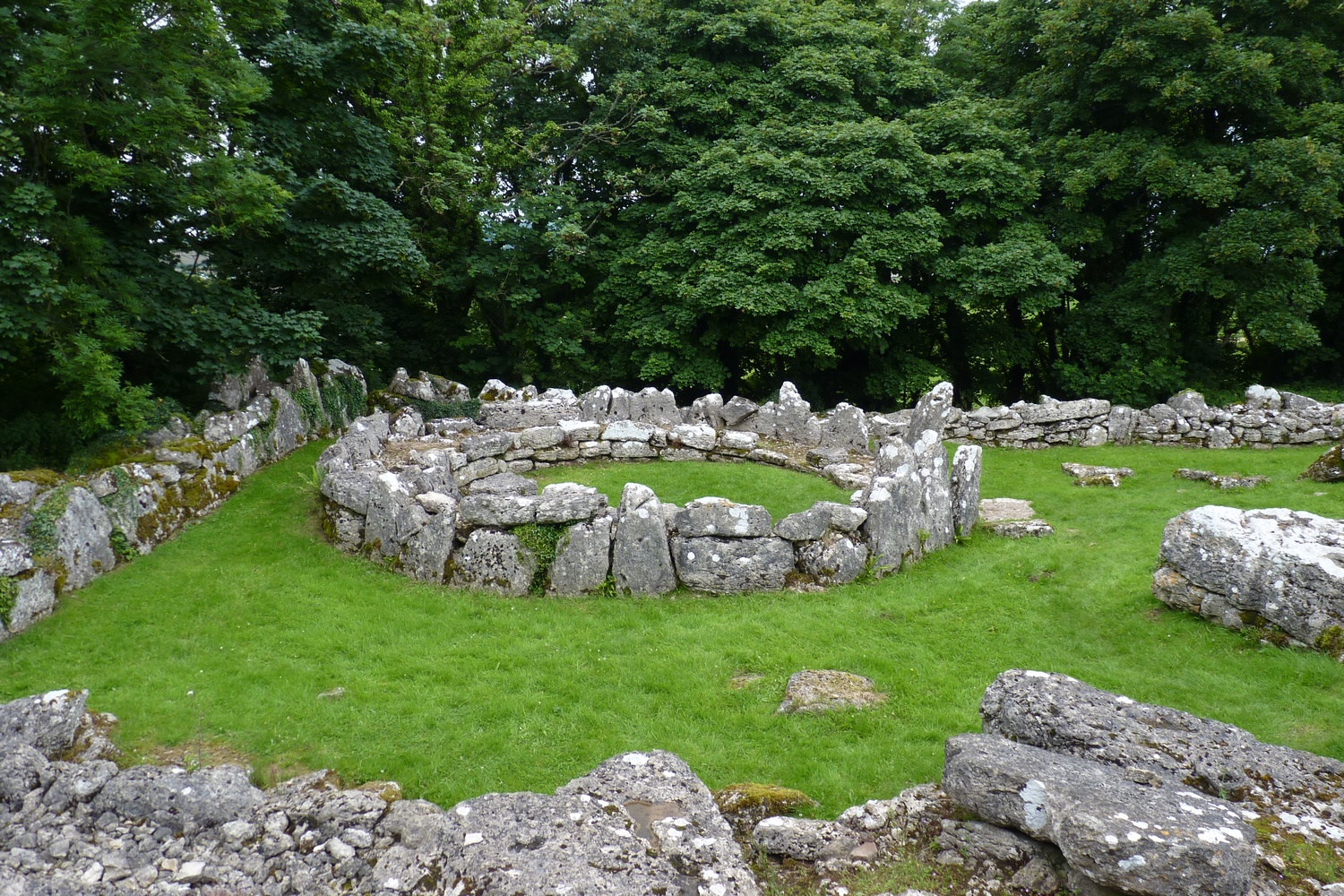
Part of the Din Lligwy hut group 9

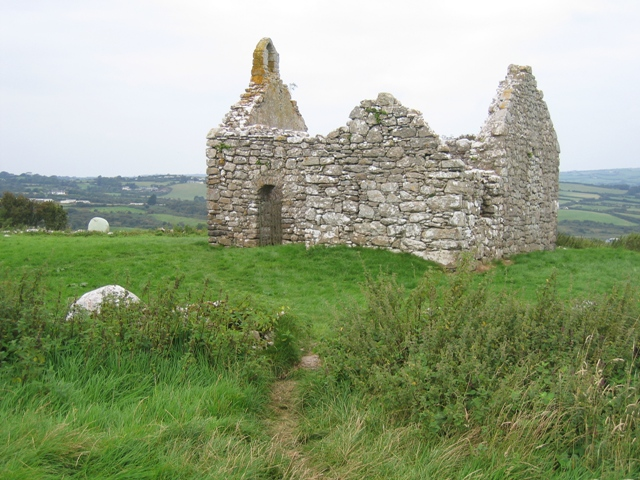
The ruins of Lligwy Chapel 11

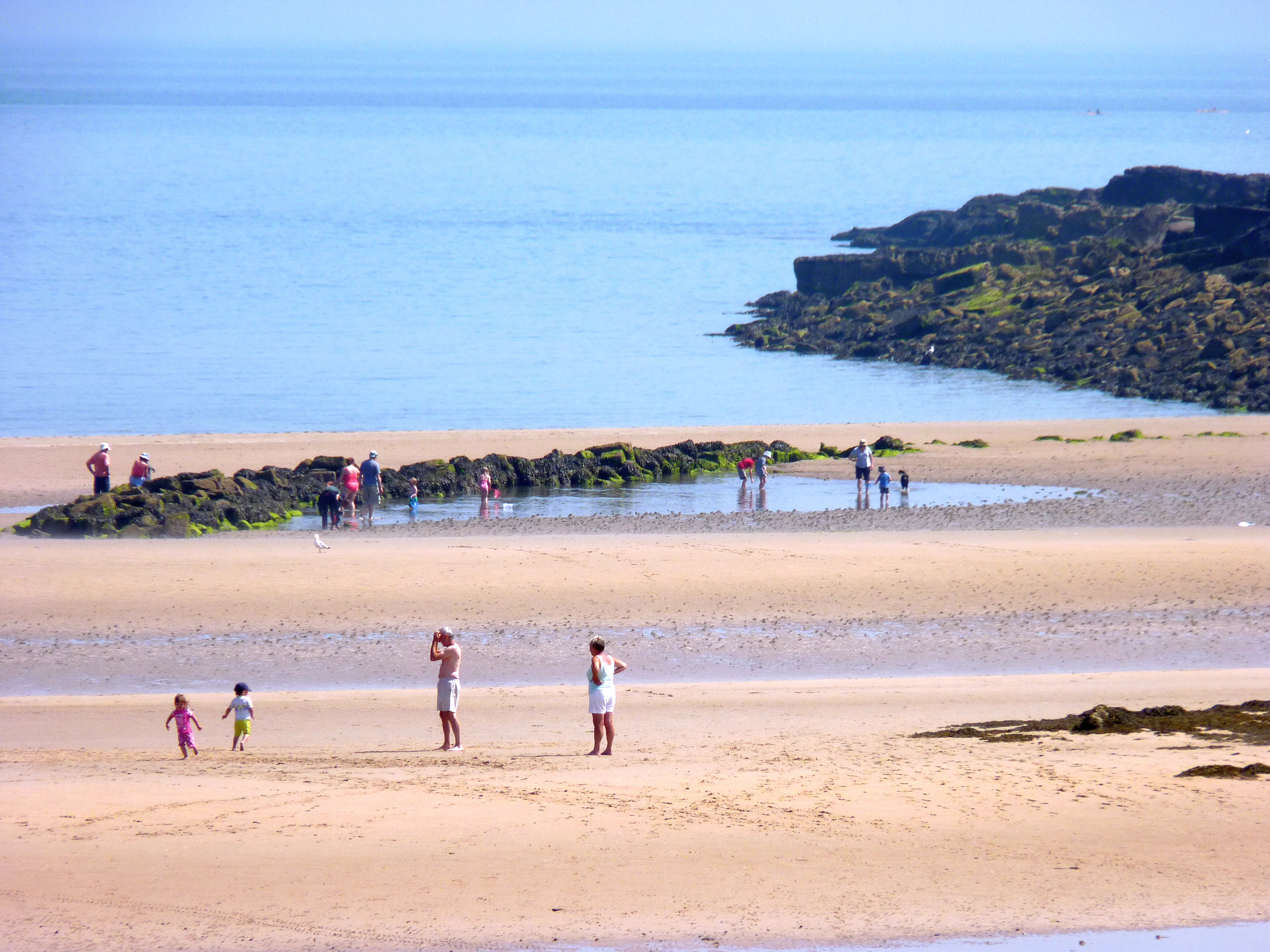
Fish trap built near the low-tide mark of Lligwy Bay. 13

The Community of Moelfre has 14 Scheduled Ancient Monuments, which is more than any other in Anglesey. The majority are prehistoric and include a Neolithic burial site and a standing stone. Six of them are Iron Age settlements, suggesting a well-settled landscape by the time the Romans arrived. Three of the monuments (denoted in the table by) are in the care of Cadw. These are signposted from the road, have public access and explanation boards at the site. Other scheduled monuments may or may not be visible from roads or footpaths, and have no automatic right of access.

Name	Site type	Location	Details
1 Ogof Arian Cave	Cave	53.3686°N 4.2781°W, SH485881	Cave with an inner chamber that runs some 25m into the hillside. Neolithic flint tools have been found. It is also known locally as Ogof Ladran (Smugglers' Cave).
2 Lligwy Burial Chamber	Chambered tomb	53.3499°N 4.2529°W, SH501860	Neolithic stone monument with a huge capstone supported by 8 side stones, all of locally occurring limestone. Described in 1781, excavated in 1909, it contained numerous Neolithic flints and pots, along with 15-30 human burials. An East, West and South alignment of stones suggests possible astronomical purposes.
3 Plas Bodafon standing stone	Standing stone	53.3444°N 4.2907°W, SH476855	In woodland west of Plas Bodafon, the prehistoric stone is 1.3m high, of an unusual quartzite.
4 Bwlch-y-Dafarn Enclosed Hut Group	Enclosed hut circle	53.3463°N 4.2654°W, SH492856	Roughly rectangular walled enclosure. Within it a well defined roundhouse, 6m across with paved floor, had Roman pottery finds. There are also two large rectangular buildings.
5 Glan'r Afon Hut Circle	Unenclosed hut circle	53.3448°N 4.2536°W, SH500854	Hut circle of 8m diameter with rubble-filled 1.3m thick walls, up to 0.8m high. Now in thick woodland; rectangular buildings alongside have also been recorded.
6 Marian-glas Hut Group	Unenclosed hut circle	53.3379°N 4.2516°W, SH501846	A roundhouse settlement, also called Cae Marh, with several huts with thick walls, some standing up to 1.4m high. Some of the hut walls are now obscured by a thicket, while others are visible as wall lines in the lawns of Marianglas caravan park. A sign by the Ministry of Public Building and Works (1962–70) indicates the location.
7 Parc Salmon Hut Group	Unenclosed hut circle	53.3509°N 4.2552°W, SH500861	Circular hut and a nearby mound of discarded shellfish, with pottery and other items including half of a bronze ring. The hut had flooring of cobbles set in the earth, and a mortar stone set into the floor.
8 Coed Newydd Smelting Hearth	Burnt mound	53.3475°N 4.2715°W, SH488858	The schedule describes this as Boiling Mounds and a Smelting Hearth, referring to a probably Bronze Age feature with a flooring of fire-crazed cobbles in a sunken enclosure beside a small tributary of the Afon Lligwy. It featured in an article in Archaeologia Cambrensis of 1913, and is assumed to relate to either cooking or metalworking activities.
9 Din Lligwy Hut Group	Enclosed hut circle	53.3508°N 4.2592°W, SH497861	Stone foundation walls of a group of Iron Age houses and workshops, surrounded by an enclosing wall.
10 Bodafon Mountain Hut Groups	Enclosed hut circle	53.3394°N 4.2983°W, SH470849	Three groups of Iron Age hut circles have been identified on a terrace of the 168 metres (551 ft) hill called Bodafon Mountain. The area is now open heathland, allowing some access from the footpath that runs nearby. Excavations in the 1950s identified sherds of Samian ware, indicating occupation well into the Roman period.
11 Capel Lligwy	Chapel	53.3523°N 4.2564°W, SH499863	A ruined chapel standing in a field near Rhos Lligwy, dating back to the first half of the 12th century. It contains a 16th-century side chapel with a vault beneath, and at some point became a private place of worship for a nearby house, then later fell into disrepair and now has no roof, but stands as a picturesque ruin.
12 Ffynnon Allgo (St Allgo's Well)	Holy Well	53.3385°N 4.2559°W, SH498847	Medieval well associated with St Gallgo, whose church is at Llanallgo. The well is now within a caravan park.
13 Traeth Lligwy Fish Weir	Fish trap	53.3606°N 4.2555°W, SH500872	Fish trap built as a crescent of rocks near the low-tide mark of Lligwy Bay, near Moelfre, Anglesey. It is of uncertain date but thought to be medieval. At high tide it is completely covered, and was used to trap fish in the pond it creates at low tide.

=== Maritime history ===
The headland north of Moelfre was the site of the wreck in 1859 of the steam clipper The Royal Charter near the end of its voyage from Australia to Liverpool. A memorial on the headland and an obelisk in Llanallgo Churchyard commemorate the 400 lives lost. On July 30, 1862, the screw sloop Enrica, soon to be commissioned as the Confederate States of America warship CSS Alabama, sheltered in Moelfre Bay while evading both British customs authorities and the USS Tuscarora, which had been sent to capture or sink her.

The difficulties posed to sailing ships by the east-facing shore and limited seaway resulted in many ships being wrecked off the Moelfre coast. As well as the Royal Charter, there is the wreck of the Princess Amelia (1868) on Lligwy beach, and the Kate caught fire off Moelfre harbour in 1933. Many ships, like the Royal Charter and, 100 years later, the Hindlea II, ended up driven by autumn or spring gales onto the shore. On the 500m of coast south of Moelfre there are the wrecks of the Brothers (1826), the Sarah Davison (1881), the Riviera (1892), the Dart (1888), the Alexandrina (1890), the Margaret Elizabeth (1906), the Dinas (1907), the Jewess (1910) and the William Henry (1915).

=== Lifeboats ===
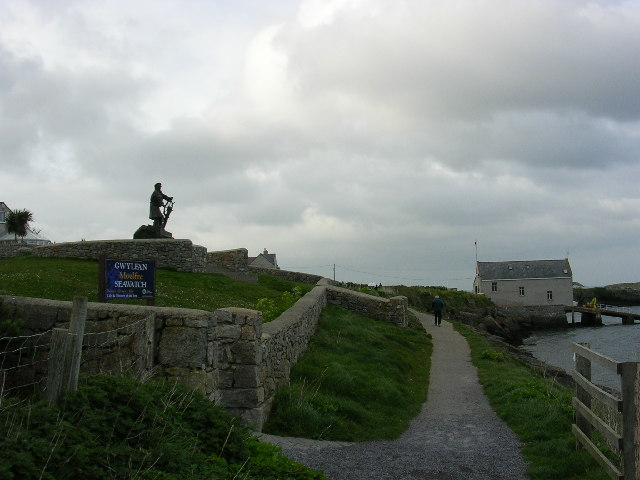
The Lifeboat station and Seawatch Centre

Moelfre RNLI Lifeboat Station has a distinguished history, including the Hindlea rescue in 1959, when all the crew were rescued. There has been a lifeboat in Moelfre since 1854. The lifeboat station is open to the public for most of the year, and houses the Tamar-class lifeboat Kiwi and the inshore inflatable D-class lifeboat (IB1) Enfys.

Actress Jennifer Ellison was rescued in August 2013 off Moelfre.

A statue of Richard Evans, lifeboatman, was unveiled in 2004 by Prince Charles, outside the Seawatch Museum, which is close to the lifeboat station. It presents information relating to the area and the history of the lifeboats associated with Moelfre.

=== Nature ===
This area is by the sandy beach Traeth Lligwy and the ancient stone homestead of Din Lligwy. Nearby Ynys Moelfre are birds, and seals and porpoises may also be seen. There are more details on the village website.

== Amenities ==
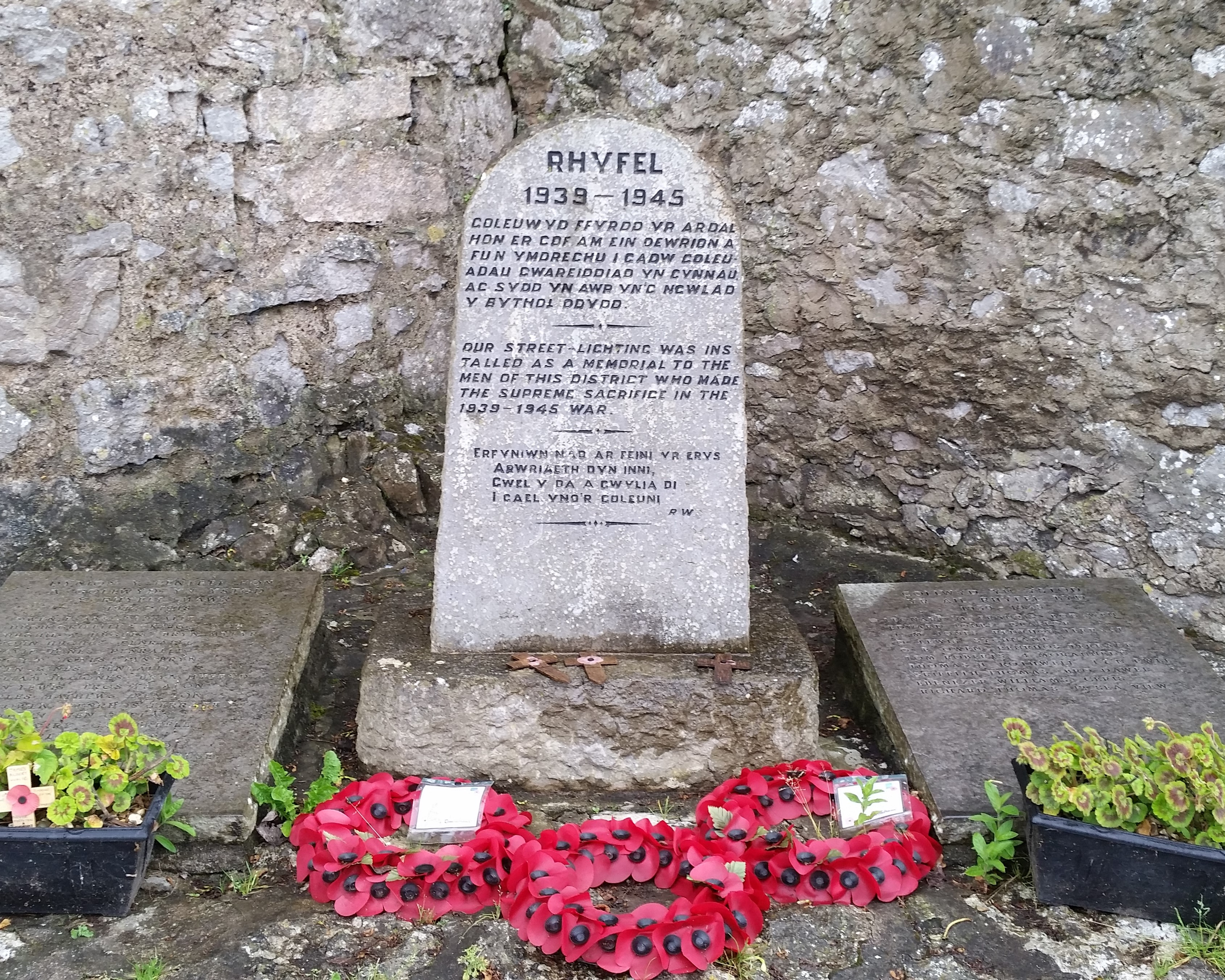
Memorial stone in Moelfre commemorating the street lighting, installed as memorial to those who died in World War II

St Galgo's Anglican Church dates back to the 7th century. Carmel Congregational Chapel was built in 1829. Both have weekly services in Welsh and English. Paradws Chapel is Calvinistic Methodist.

The village has a school with a hall that can be used for public events. Ysgol Gymuned Moelfre (Community School) teaches in Welsh. There were 63 pupils at all levels in 2013. The local library is in the same building. The village also has a football club, CPD Bro Goronwy, based in School Lane.

There were no street lights in the village until well after the Second World War, when they were installed as a memorial to the village's war dead.

In the village there are restaurants, a small public convenience shop and a fish and chip shop. The RNLI Gwylfan Moelfre Seawatch Centre has a small museum, shop and book store.

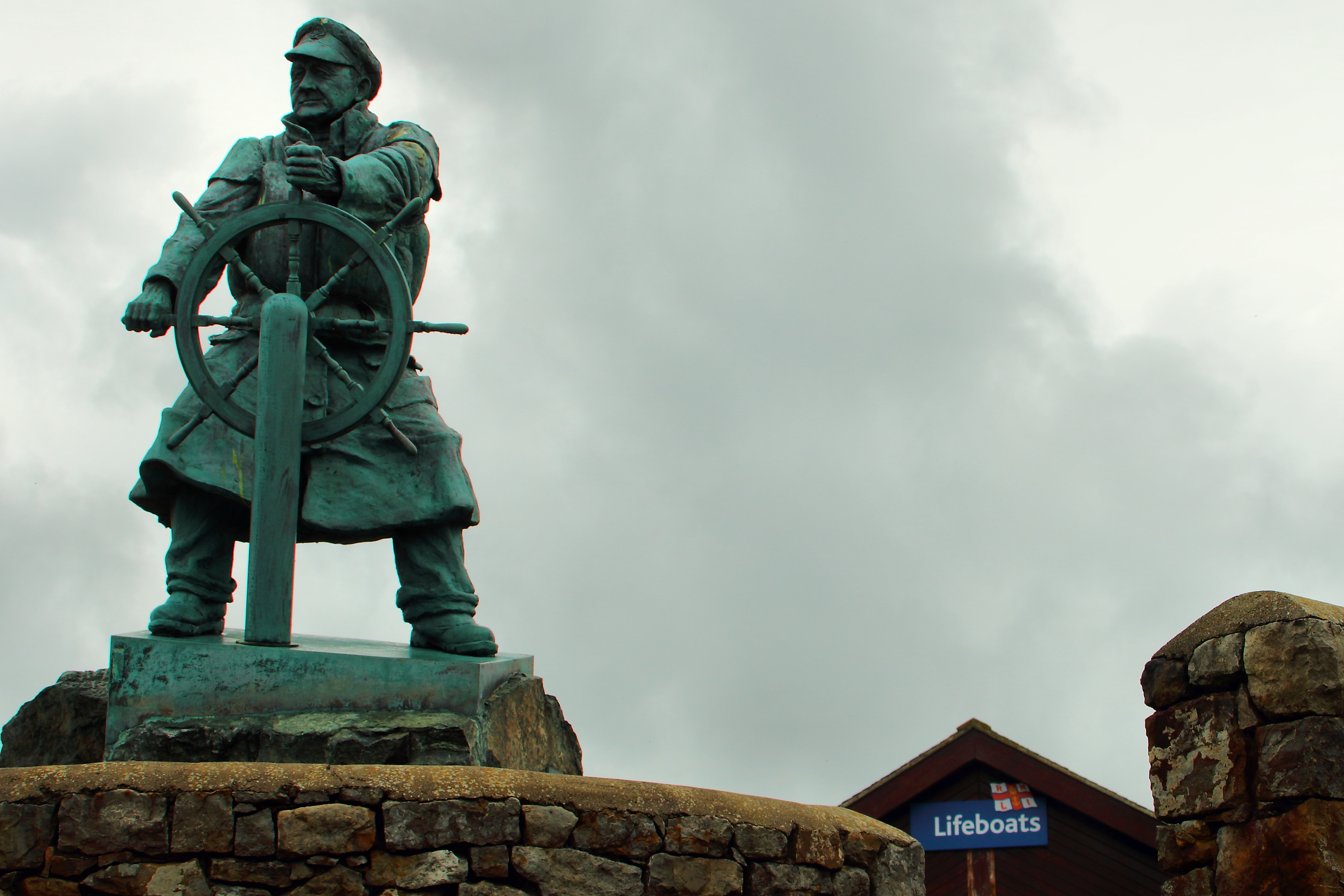
Statue of Richard Evans at RNLI Moelfre

== Notable people ==
- Richard Evans (1905–2001) a lifeboatman with 50 years of service
- Aled Eames (1921–1996), maritime historian, lived in the village for a long period.
- John Walter Jones (1946–2020), first Chief Executive of the Welsh Language Board from 1993 to 2004.
