= Llanallgo =

Village in Anglesey, Wales

Coordinates: 53.343714°N 4.248655°W

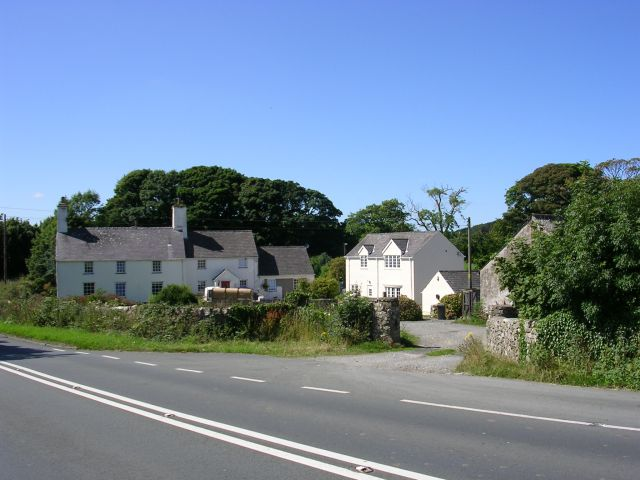

- Location within Anglesey
- OS grid reference: SH 502851
- Community: Moelfre
- Principal area: Anglesey
- Preserved county: Gwynedd
- Country: Wales
- Sovereign state: United Kingdom
- Post town: Moelfre
- Police: North Wales
- Fire: North Wales
- Ambulance: Welsh
- UK Parliament: Ynys Môn
- Senedd Cymru – Welsh Parliament: Bangor Conwy Môn

Llanallgo (Welsh: [ɬanˈaɬɡɔ]) is a small village a mile from the coast of the island of Anglesey. The community is in the community of Moelfre, Anglesey, Wales, which is 136.4 miles (219.6 km) from Cardiff and 214.9 miles (345.9 km) from London.

St Gallgo's Church, contains a memorial to hundreds lost when the Royal Charter bound from Australia to Liverpool hit the nearby Moelfre rocks. 140 are buried in the churchyard and others nearby. The monument is said to be of marble cut from near where the ship was lost on 26 October 1859.

Nearby is Ffynnon Allgo, a medieval well which is a scheduled monument. There is a caravan park. The nearest larger village is Marian-glas, about 1 km to the south.

Until 1984 Llanallgo was a community.
