= Capel Lligwy =

Coordinates: 53.352429°N 4.256416°W

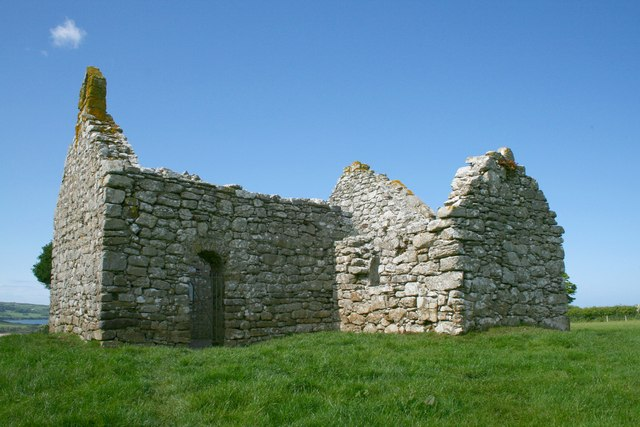
- The ruined chapel, showing the doorway and the 16th-century side chapel (to the right)

- Location in Anglesey
- Location: Rhos Lligwy, Anglesey
- Country: Wales

History
- Status: Chapel of ease
- Founded: 12th century
- Dedication: Unknown

Architecture
- Functional status: Ruined
- Heritage designation: Grade II
- Designated: 2 September 1952
- Architectural type: Church
- Style: Medieval
- Closed: 18th century

Specifications
- Materials: Rubble masonry

Capel Lligwy (sometimes referred to as Hen Gapel Lligwy) is a ruined chapel near Rhos Lligwy in Anglesey, north Wales, dating back to the first half of the 12th century. The chapel's original purpose is unknown, but it might have been used as a memorial chapel or in connection with a local royal court, or as a chapel of ease in a large parish with a growing population. It was used for a time until the early 18th century as a private place of worship for a nearby house, then later fell into disrepair. The walls still remain, with some traces of render on them internally, but there is no roof.

It contains a 16th-century side chapel with a vault beneath, used as a burial chamber. It is a Grade II listed building, a national designation given to "buildings of special interest, which warrant every effort being made to preserve them", in particular because it is "a substantially 12th-century structure" with the "unusual 16th-century vaulted south chapel".

In 2024, it was announced that Cadw would rename it as Capel Llugwy.

== History and location ==
The oldest parts of Capel Lligwy date from the first half of the 12th century. This was a time when many churches on Anglesey in north-west Wales were first built in stone following the end of Viking raids and attempts by the Normans to gain control of the island. The reason for its construction, and the saint to whom it was dedicated, are unknown. Geraint Jones, author of a 2006 guide to the churches of Anglesey, suggests that it may originally have been a memorial chapel, or connected to a royal court nearby. Yates and Longley, authors of a 2001 guide to ancient Anglesey monuments, note that it was built in the large parish of Penrhos Lligwy and was perhaps intended to serving the expanding population in medieval times. Despite this, it seems to have remained as a chapel of ease rather than become a parish church in its own right. The chapel is sometimes referred to as "Hen Gapel Lligwy" ("hen" being the Welsh word for "old" and "capel" meaning "chapel").

The walls were partially rebuilt in the 14th century, and the upper parts of the walls date from this time. A chapel was added to the south side of the building in the 16th century. A vault under the south chapel was used to bury members of a local family, the Pierce Lloyds. In 1999, the vault was used to record some "atmospheres" for the album "You Have Just Been Poisoned By The Serpents" by The Serpents, a collective of Welsh musicians including members of Echo and the Bunnymen, Super Furry Animals and Ectogram that was described by one journalist as "possibly the strangest pop group of all time".

For a time, Capel Lligwy was used as a private place of worship for Lligwy House, a "venerable mansion" once owned by the Lloyd family which came into the possession of William Irby, 1st Baron Boston, in the 18th century. After the early part of the 18th century, however, the chapel became unused and began to fall into disrepair. The walls remain to gable level, with some traces of render on the inside, but the roof has gone.

Capel Lligwy is in the Anglesey countryside near Llanallgo; the parish church of St Gallgo, Llanallgo is about 0.78 miles (1.26 km) away. Part of the churchyard wall remains, showing that it was originally within a mainly circular enclosure, as often found with early churches. It is cared for by Cadw, the Welsh Assembly Government body responsible for the built heritage of Wales, and is open to the public. In 2024, it was announced that Cadw would rename the chapel to Capel Llugwy, as part of an effort to standardise the names in both English and Welsh.

== Architecture and fittings ==
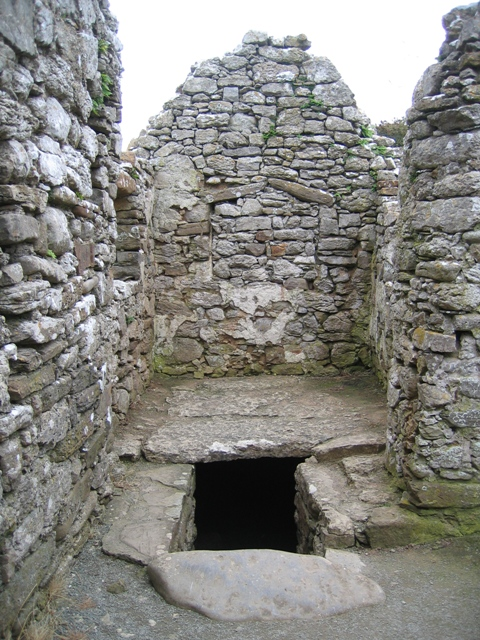
The south chapel, showing the entrance to the vault

Capel Lligwy is built from rubble masonry; at about 5 feet (1.5 m) up the walls, the style changes and smaller stones are inserted into spaces between the larger blocks, showing where the 14th-century rebuilding started. The doorway is on the south side, headed by a plain arch, and dates from the 12th century. There is a stone bellcote at the west end. There is no structural division between the nave (where the congregation would have sat) and the chancel (where the altar would have been located). There are no window openings on the north side, but there is a blocked opening to the east (about 5 feet (1.5 m) wide) and there are the remains of a window on the south wall. There is a blocked window in the south wall of the south chapel. The vault, which is about 27 square feet (2.5 m^{2}), is reached by stone steps from inside the south chapel. Limestone slabs form the roof of the vault and the floor of the chapel above. A stone in the nave, about 2 square feet (0.19 m^{2}) with a hole in the top, might once have been used as a churchyard cross.

== Assessment ==
Capel Lligwy has national recognition and statutory protection from alteration as it has been designated as a Grade II listed building – the lowest of the three grades of listing, designating "buildings of special interest, which warrant every effort being made to preserve them". It was given this status on 2 September 1952 and has been listed because it is "important as a substantially 12th-century structure, with some architectural details surviving from this early period", even though it is now in a "ruinous condition". Cadw (which is responsible for the inclusion of Welsh buildings on the statutory lists) also notes the "unusual 16th-century vaulted south chapel".

The 19th-century antiquarian Angharad Llwyd mentioned the church in her history of Anglesey. She said that the architecture was of "the rudest kind, [which] bears testimony to its great antiquity." She recounted that a fox had once taken shelter in the ruins, and when it was dug out, the vault was discovered, "containing several human skeletons, which crumbled into dust, when exposed to the air". She added that further exploration of the vault then revealed "a large mass of human bones, several feet in depth".

A 1990 book about abandoned churches in Wales refers to the ancient monuments in this part of Anglesey, and calls Capel Lligwy a "medieval gesture of Christian power in a land so obviously imbued with the spirit of a pagan past". It notes that "the wheel has turned full circle and Capel Lligwy today is just another ruined relic of a former age." The authors describe the chapel as a "simple, square building" with a "small and ruggedly austere south chapel", adding that the stone slabs over the vault are "almost in imitation of the ancient burial chambers which dot the surrounding landscape."

== See also ==
- Din Lligwy, a nearby Iron Age site
- Lligwy Burial Chamber, a nearby Neolithic burial chamber
