= Lligwy Burial Chamber =

Neolithic dolmen in Wales

Coordinates: 53.3499°N 4.2529°W

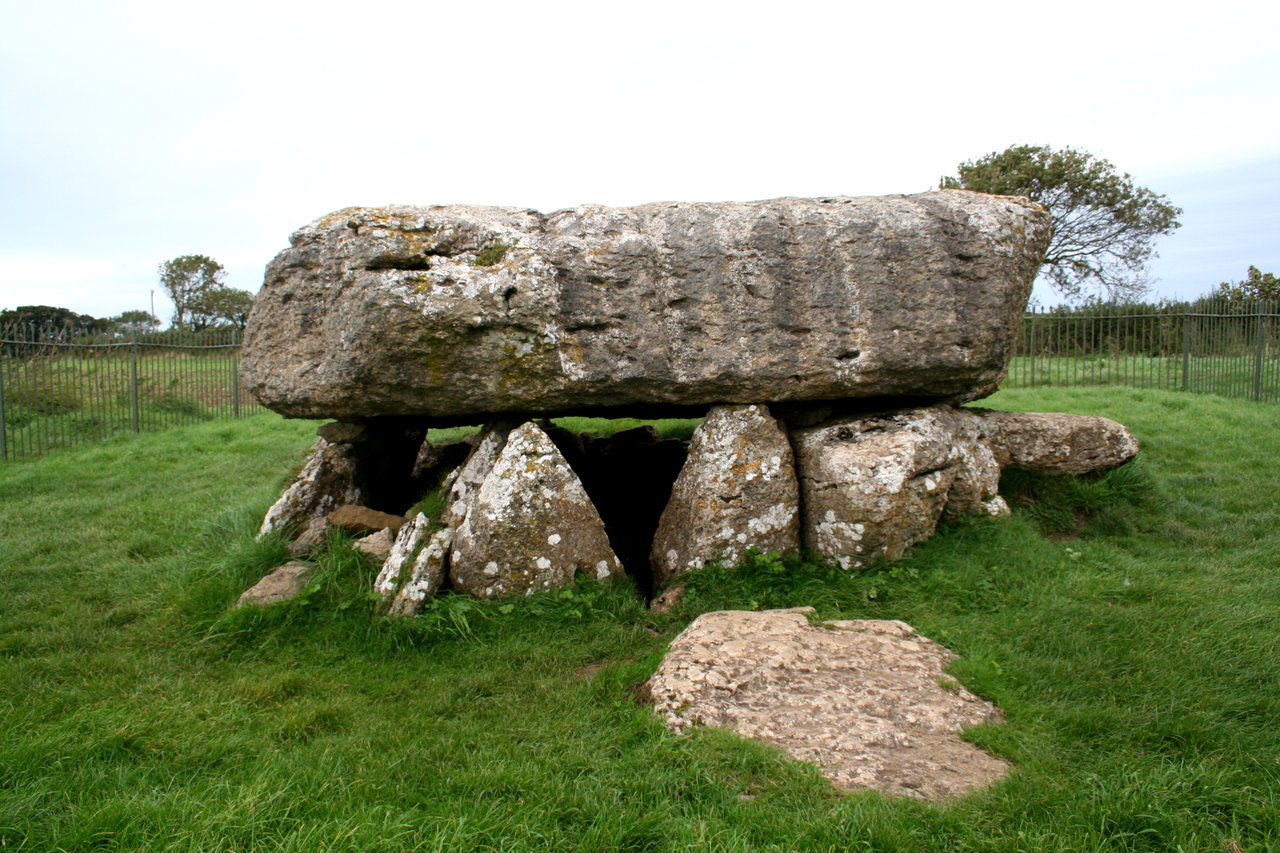
Lligwy Burial Chamber

Lligwy Burial Chamber is a Neolithic burial chamber in Lligwy, near the east coast of Anglesey, Wales, United Kingdom. It consists of a circle of upright stones, made into a low chamber by a very large roof slab estimated at 25 tonnes. Excavation in 1909 found the remains of some 15 to 30 people, and pottery suggesting a Late Neolithic date. Half a mile to the west of the village of Moelfre, the site is within a few metres of the road, where there is room to leave a single car for short periods.

== Burial chamber ==
Lligwy Burial Chamber is a very robust, Neolithic chamber. The eight uprights which support the massive capstone are larger than they at first appear, because half of their 2 m (6.6 ft) height is buried in the ground. The capstone is about 5.5 m (18.0 ft) long and 4.5 m (14.8 ft) wide, with a thickness of around 1 m (3.3 ft). It is estimated to weigh about 25 tonnes (28 tons) and is in contact with only three of the uprights. A gap between the uprights on the eastern side probably indicates where an entrance passage stood, with a way out of the mound; It is unclear whether this chambered tomb was covered by a cairn, but if it was, no trace remains today. Deep grooves in the limestone capstone imply that erosion by rainfall has taken place, further evidence that the structure may not have been covered by a cairn.

E.N. Baynes's excavations in 1909 discovered artefacts in two separate layers, indicating that the site was used during two separate periods. The bones from up to thirty people have been found in the chamber, as well as shellfish (mussels and limpets) and many animal bones. Fragments of pottery from the two different settlements periods are present; grooved ware dating to the Neolithic period and beaker ware from the early Bronze Age. Some 400 m (1,300 ft) to the west lies the well-preserved Din Lligwy hut circle, but this is not a contemporary structure, probably dating from the second to fourth centuries AD.

Lligwy Burial Chamber is a scheduled ancient monument. The Royal Commission on the Ancient and Historical Monuments of Wales curates the archaeological, architectural and historic records for this site. Included in the archives are many digital images of the site, a DOE photographic collection, NMR site files, Cadw guardianship records, colour photographs, black and white photographs, aerial photographs and an extract from the June 1933 edition of Archaeologia Cambrensis with the title "The Pottery from the Lligwy Burial Chamber, Anglesey".

== Media ==
The HeritageTogether project has used photogrammetry to create 3D models of the site

== Access ==
The burial chamber is in the care of Cadw; the site is open to the public, free of charge, throughout the year, except for Christmas Eve, Christmas Day, Boxing Day and New Year's Day. The burial chamber is very close to the road and can be accessed on foot from a parking bay at the edge of the unclassified road, about 0.75 mi (1.2 km) north of Llanallgo.
