= Din Lligwy =

British settlement with Roman artefacts

Coordinates: 53.350366°N 4.259479°W

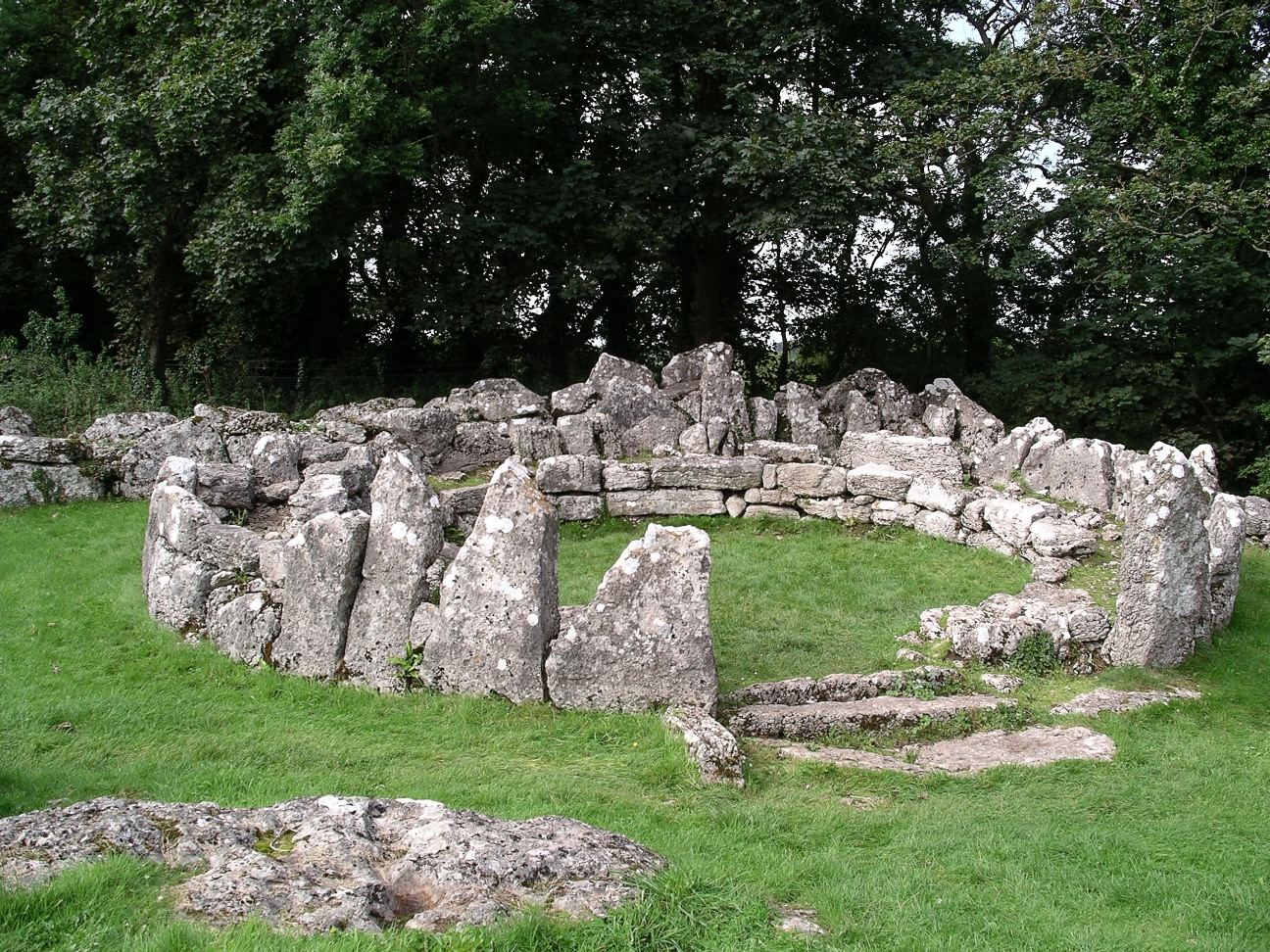
House foundations at Din Lligwy hut circle, Anglesey, August 2, 2004

Din Lligwy, officially spelled Din Llugwy, hut circle is an ancient village site near the east coast of Anglesey, close to the village of Moelfre, North Wales.

Excavations in 1905–1907 produced hundreds of Roman-period pot sherds of the 3rd and 4th centuries CE, many repaired with iron clamps. Animal bones were found too, some made into tools and one into a musical instrument. The most important economic activity, however, appears to have been iron working, smithing and perhaps smelting.

Despite the mainly Roman finds, the origins of the settlement may well go back into the Iron Age and it was probably a small farming community. From excavation, it seems that the round structures were probably houses and the rectangular ones barns or workshops.

For a Roman site, much remains visible above ground, including the enclosing wall and the foundations of many buildings, many of them with substantial and well made foundations constructed from the local limestone. The outer protective wall is almost intact although much reduced in height.

Din Lligwy is situated on a low hill with good views over Anglesey and a reliable source of fresh water nearby. The hill is now overgrown with sycamore and ash but it is probable that when it was occupied, the village would have had uninterrupted views all around.

Since 2024, Cadw, who maintain the site, use the spelling "Llugwy".

== See also ==
- Capel Lligwy, a nearby ruined 12th-century chapel
- Lligwy Burial Chamber, a nearby Neolithic burial chamber
