= Liverpool and North Wales Steamship Company =

Now defunct Liverpool based pleasure cruise company

- Industry: excursion-steamer operator
- Founded: 1890
- Defunct: 1962
- Fate: Voluntary liquidation
- Successor: Routes sold to P and A Campbell and Isle of Man Steam Packet Company
- Headquarters: Liverpool
- Products: Liverpool-Holyhead-Llandudno-Menai Straits-Beaumaris-Bangor
- Parent: Fairfield Shipbuilding and Engineering Company

The Liverpool and North Wales Steamship Company (LNWSC) was a pleasure cruise company based in Liverpool.

== Foundation ==
In 1890, the Glasgow-based Fairfield Shipbuilding and Engineering Company had formed the New North Wales Steamship Company (NNWSS). The pleasure cruiser market was quickly changing, and bigger boats meant cheaper prices, and hence higher profits. The NNWSS operated its first season with the new Fairfield-built St Tudno, far bigger than any rival vessel on that run.

As a result, in 1891 the NNWSS took over the rival Liverpool, Llandudno and Welsh Coast Steam Boat Company (LL&WC) to form the LNWSC. The original St Tudno was sold to Germany, but along with the older and smaller LL&WC steamers was replaced by the brand new St Tudno, which became the first ship to run under LNWSC colours.

The flag of the LNWSC was white swallowtail, bearing a blue cross throughout, with three gold-coloured ostrich feathers in the form of the Fleur-de-Lys in the centre.

In 1899, the company took over the smaller Snowdon Passenger Steamboat Company (SPSC), which had started in 1892.

== Operations ==
The company's main route was as described in their name: Liverpool, Holyhead, Llandudno and the Menai Straits piers of Beaumaris and Bangor. The company's largest ships operated this route. They also operated services north to Fleetwood, west to the Isle of Man, and around the Isle of Anglesey. Llandudno is 37 mi (60 km) from Liverpool by sea and Menai Bridge another 15 mi (24 km). Douglas is 54 mi (87 km) from Llandudno.

== Cessation ==
Along with other pleasure steamer companies, the LNWSC suffered from the excursion market’s decline starting in the 1950s, due to competition from the motor bus and later the motor car.

The company went into voluntary liquidation at the end of the 1962 season. The receiver immediately sold the St Seiriol for scrap in November 1962, followed by St Tudno in April 1963. The St Trillo was sold to rival P and A Campbell, who continued to run excursions from Llandudno until the 1970s.

== Legacy ==
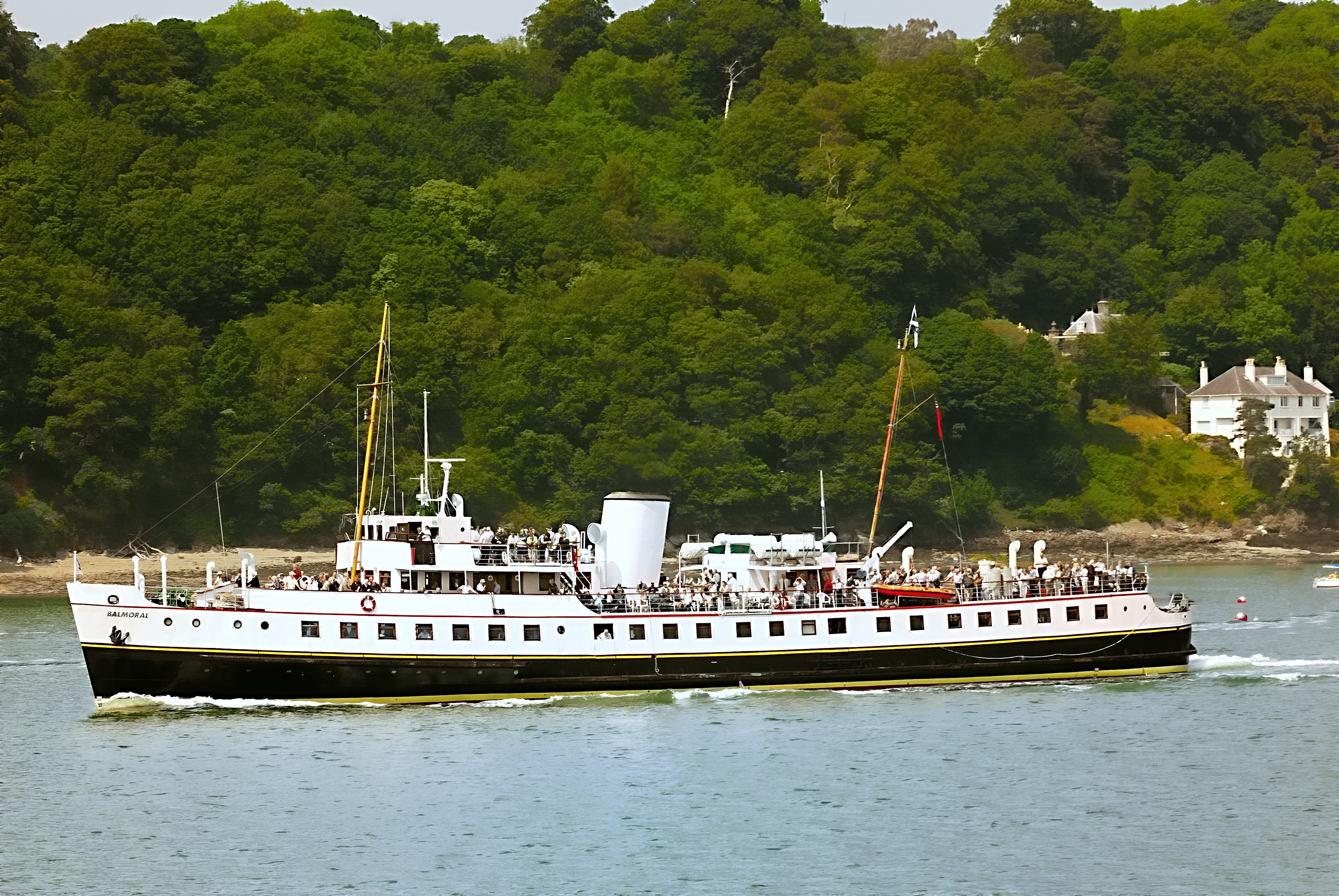
The coastal pleasure steamer MV Balmoral in the Menai Straits, as seen from Garth Pier, Bangor, 2007

Services from Liverpool to Llandudno, and Llandudno to Douglas were taken over by the Isle of Man Steam Packet Company, at a reduced frequency. The coastal pleasure steamer MV Balmoral regularly operated summer pleasure cruises on the same routes as the LNWSC, but was taken out of service in 2017.

In the 1990s, a series of early films were rediscovered from Mitchell and Kenyon, who had filmed LNWSC vessels on trips between Liverpool, Holyhead and Llandudno, featuring the St.Tudno and St. Elvies.

== Revival in 2016 ==
In 2016 the Liverpool & North Wales Steamship Company Ltd was formed, with the aim of re-introducing pleasure cruises to Liverpool and the North Wales coast. Restoration began on a 1959-built motor vessel and additional purchases were planned. Restoration of the ferry, renamed TSMV Endeavour, was well underway in May 2019 when it sank at its moorings in Canada Dock, following a suspected break-in. Shortly afterwards, the company's social media accounts were removed and their accounts are overdue as of May 2021.

== Fleet ==
The fleet was supplied direct from the Govan yards of Fairfield, where vessels had either been freshly built or heavily refurbished, and where winter maintenance was also undertaken.

The paddle steamer St Elvies was introduced in 1896, mainly deployed on excursions on the Isle of Man route. After the purchase of the SPSC in 1899, she was joined by their paddle steamer Snowdon. In the 1904 season, the expensive La Marguerite was transferred from the Thames Estuary services, operating from Liverpool on the main route until the end of the 1925 season.

After this point, steam turbine vessels began to be deployed. The first steam turbine vessel to be built for the LNWSC was 1914s St Seiriol, but she was lost during World War I, when all commercial services had been suspended. Hence the St Tudno in 1925 became the first turbine vessel, with a second similar but smaller version also called St Seiriol joining in 1931. In the mid-1930s the small diesel-powered St Silio joined the fleet, renamed St Trillo after World War II, again when commercial services were suspended.

=== Fleet details ===
Name	Builder	GWT	Built	Entered service	Disposed	Notes	
Paris			1875	1890	1892	Originally NNWSS	
PS Bonnie Princess		434 long tons (441 t)	1882	1882	1895		
PS St Tudno	Fairfield	1,146 long tons (1,164 t)	1889	1890	1921	Sold to Ballin company in Hamburg, Germany. Renamed PS Cobra, served with Hapag	
PS St Tudno	Fairfield	794 long tons (807 t)	1891	1891	1912		PS St. Tudno
PS St Elvies	Fairfield	566 long tons (575 t)	1896		1931		
PS Snowdon	Laird, Birkenhead	338 long tons (343 t)	1892	1899	1931		
PS La Marguerite	Fairfield	1,554 long tons (1,579 t)	1894	1904	1925	Moved from English Channel service. Certified for 2,077 passengers.	PS La Marguerite at Bangor
PS St Elian	Barclay Curle	203 long tons (206 t)	1872	1907	1915		
PS St Trillo	Barclay Curle	163 long tons (166 t)	1909		1921		
St Seiriol	A & J Inglis	1,586 long tons (1,611 t)	1909	1914	1915	Never joined the fleet, sunk during World War I	
St Tudno	Fairfield	2,326 long tons (2,363 t)	1925	1925	1963	Certified for 2,493 passengers, cruise speed 19 kn (35 km/h; 22 mph), 4,100 hp (3,100 kW) steam turbine Scrapped 1963.	Views of SS St Tudno leaving the Mersey in 1962
St Seiriol	Fairfield	1,586 long tons (1,611 t)	1931	1931	1962	Certified for 1,556 passengers, cruise speed 18.5 kn (34.3 km/h; 21.3 mph) steam turbine Scrapped 1962.	
MV St Silio	Fairfield	314 long tons (319 t)	1935	1935	1963	1945 renamed St Trillo, sold to rival P and A CampbellCertified for 568 passengers, cruise speed 13.5 kn (25.0 km/h; 15.5 mph) Crossley diesel engines 232 hp (173 kW) Scrapped 1975.	
