= 100 Welsh Heroes =

2003–04 opinion poll

100 Welsh Heroes was an opinion poll run in Wales as a response to the BBC's 100 Greatest Britons poll of 2002. It was carried out mainly on the internet, starting on 8 September 2003 and finishing on 23 February 2004. The results were announced on 1 March (St David's Day) 2004 and subsequently published in a book.

== Conduct of the poll ==
The poll was operated by Culturenet Cymru, a Welsh Assembly-funded body based at the National Library of Wales in Aberystwyth. At the time of the results being announced the organisers claimed that the 81,323 nominations and votes made it the largest online poll conducted in Wales.

Former Labour leader Neil Kinnock, himself named in the poll, had, during the voting, drawn attention to a Welsh nationalist "plot" to have Owain Glyndŵr at number one, rather than the eventual winner, Aneurin Bevan.

Only nine of the list of a hundred are female, of whom Catherine Zeta-Jones was the most popular, with 1136 votes.

== Results ==
The top 100 were:

1. Aneurin Bevan, (1897–1960) politician (2,426 votes) – No. 45 in the 100 Greatest Britons list
2. Owain Glyndŵr, (1359–1415) Prince of Wales (2,309 votes) – No. 23 in the 100 Greatest Britons list
3. Tom Jones, (1940–) singer (2,072 votes)
4. Gwynfor Evans, (1912–2005) politician (1,928 votes)
5. Richard Burton, (1925–1984) actor (1,755 votes) – No. 96 in the 100 Greatest Britons list
6. Gareth Edwards, (1947–) rugby player (1,685 votes)
7. Dylan Thomas, (1914–1953) poet (1,630 votes)
8. David Lloyd George, (1863–1945) politician (1,627 votes) – No. 79 in the 100 Greatest Britons list
9. Robert Owen, (1771–1858) philanthropist and founder of socialism (1,621 votes)
10. Saunders Lewis, (1893–1985) writer and founder of Plaid Cymru (1,601 votes)
11. Mike Peters, (1959–2025) musician (1,594 votes)
12. Bertrand Russell, (1872–1970) philosopher (1,469 votes)
13. Catherine Zeta-Jones, (1969–) actress (1,136 votes)
14. R. S. Thomas, (1913–2000) poet (898 votes)
15. Andrew Vicari, (1932–2016) artist (873 votes)
16. Evan Roberts, (1878–1951) leading figure in 1904–1905 Welsh Revival (816 votes)
17. James Dean Bradfield, (1969–) musician (790 votes)
18. Bishop William Morgan (1545–1604) (775 votes)
19. John Charles, (1931–2004) footballer (769 votes)
20. Phil Campbell, (1961–) musician (763 votes)
21. Llywelyn ap Gruffudd, (c.1223–1282) Prince of Wales (564 votes)
22. Ioan Gruffudd, (1973–) actor (464 votes)
23. Richey Edwards, (1967–) musician (436 votes)
24. J. P. R. Williams, (1949–2024) rugby player (433 votes)
25. Tanni Grey-Thompson, (1969–) athlete (432 votes)
26. Simon Weston, (1961–) war hero (416 votes)
27. John Evans, (1960–) writer (352 votes)
28. Alfred Russel Wallace, (1823–1913) scientist (313 votes)
29. Michael D. Jones, (1822–1898) founder of the Welsh Patagonian community (284 votes)
30. Dafydd ap Gwilym, (c.1315/1320–c.1350/1370) poet (281 votes)
31. Rowan Williams, (1950–) Archbishop of Canterbury (273 votes)
32. Patrick Jones, (1965–) poet, playwright and filmmaker (260 votes)
33. Julian Cayo-Evans, (1937–1995) political activist and freedom fighter (257 votes)
34. Tommy Cooper, (1921–1984) comedian (219 votes)
35. Roald Dahl, (1916–1990) author (201 votes)
36. John Frost, (1784–1877) Chartist leader (187 votes)
37. Hedd Wyn, (1887–1917) poet (178 votes)
38. Jimmy Wilde, (1892–1969) boxer (177 votes)
39. Dr Richard Price, (1723–1791) philosopher (171 votes)
40. Sir Kyffin Williams, (1918–2006) artist (170 votes)
41. Kate Roberts, (1891–1985) writer (167 votes)
42. Roy Jenkins, (1920–2003) politician (165 votes)
43. Hywel Dda, (880–950) king and law-giver (164 votes)
44. Sir Anthony Hopkins, (1937–) actor (160 votes)
45. Professor Steve Jones, (1944–) biologist (159 votes)
46. Saint David, (500?–589) patron saint of Wales (158 votes)
47. William Williams Pantycelyn, (1717–1791) poet (158 votes)
48. Donald Davies, (1924–2000) scientist (146 votes)
49. Ron Davies, (1946–) politician (145 votes)
50. Professor Brian Josephson, (1940–) Nobel Prize-winning scientist (144 votes)
51. Sir Henry Morton Stanley, (1841–1904) explorer (143 votes)
52. T. E. Lawrence, (1888–1935) war hero (143 votes) – No. 53 in the 100 Greatest Britons list
53. Henry VII of England, (1457–1509) King of England and Lord of Ireland (142 votes)
54. Llywelyn ab Iorwerth, (c.1173–1240) Prince of Wales (139 votes)
55. Bryn Terfel, (1965–) singer (138 votes)
56. Dic Penderyn, (1808–1831) political martyr (136 votes)
57. Ian Rush, (1961–) footballer (135 votes)
58. Neil Kinnock, (1942–) politician (135 votes)
59. W. H. Davies, (1871–1940) poet (135 votes)
60. Mark Hughes, (1963–) footballer (132 votes)
61. Sir Clough Williams-Ellis, (1883–1978) architect (120 votes)
62. Bill Frost, (1848–1935) aviator (120 votes)
63. Dafydd Iwan, (1943–) musician and politician (115 votes)
64. Dr William Price, (1800–1893) physician and eccentric (114 votes)
65. Elizabeth Phillips Hughes, (1851–1925) educator (110 votes)
66. Margaret Haig Thomas, (1883–1958) suffragette (108 votes)
67. Professor Clive Granger (1934–2009) (107 votes)
68. Sir Terry Matthews, (1943–) entrepreneur (95 votes)
69. Howell Harris, (1714–1773) religious leader (94 votes)
70. King Arthur, king of the Britons (92 votes) – No. 51 in the 100 Greatest Britons list
71. Cerys Matthews, (1969–) singer (88 votes)
72. Laura Ashley, (1925–1985) clothing designer (87 votes)
73. William Henry Preece, (1834–1913) engineer and inventor (86 votes)
74. David Davies, (1818–1890) industrialist (81 votes)
75. Thomas Jones, (1742–1803) artist (81 votes)
76. Colin Jackson, (1967–) athlete (77 votes)
77. Captain Henry Morgan, (1635–1688) buccaneer (71 votes)
78. Julien Macdonald, (1971–) fashion designer (68 votes)
79. Gwen John, (1876–1939) artist (68 votes)
80. Rhodri Mawr, (820–878) king (64 votes)
81. Iolo Morganwg, (1747–1826) poet and author, inventor of the Eisteddfod format (63 votes)
82. Alexander Cordell, (1914–1997) novelist (63 votes)
83. Owain Lawgoch, (1330–1378) claimant to throne of Wales (62 votes)
84. Dannie Abse, (1923–2014) poet (62 votes)
85. Gerald of Wales, (1146–1223) bishop and writer (60 votes)
86. Robert Recorde, (1512–1558) mathematician (57 votes)
87. David Edward Hughes, (1831–1900) scientist and musician (57 votes)
88. Richard Amerik, (1714–1782) merchant, customs officer and sheriff (57 votes)
89. Evan Evans (Ieuan Fardd), (1731–1789) poet (57 votes)
90. Richard Wilson, (1714–1782) artist (56 votes)
91. William Robert Grove, (1811–1896) judge and scientist (56 votes)
92. Megan Lloyd George, (1902–1966) politician (56 votes)
93. John Jones, (1818–1898) astronomer (55 votes)
94. Raymond Williams, (1921–1988) writer (55 votes)
95. John Cale, (1942–) musician (55 votes)
96. Ernest Jones, (1879–1958) psychiatrist (54 votes)
97. Waldo Williams, (1904–1971) poet (53 votes)
98. The Lord Rhys, (1132–1197) ruler of Deheubarth (51 votes)
99. Isaac Roberts, (1829–1904) engineer and businessman (44 votes)
100. Elizabeth Andrews, (1882–1960) first woman organiser of the Labour Party in Wales (37 votes)

== See also ==
- 100 Great Welsh Women
- Greatest Britons spin-offs
