= John Jones (astronomer) =

Welsh astronomer

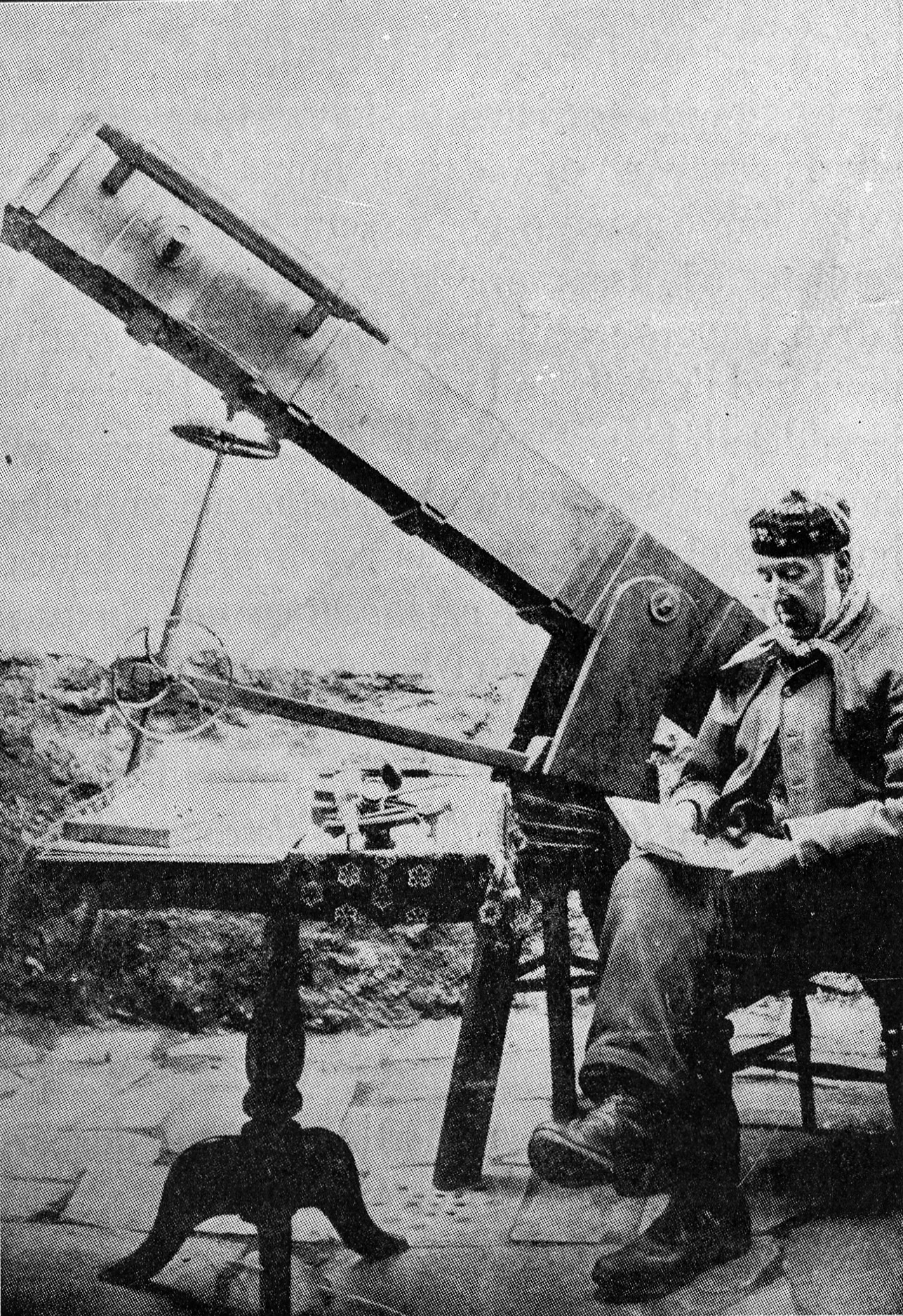
John Jones (1818–1898) of Bangor with his largest telescope, an 8-inch aperture reflector.

John Jones (1818 – 1898), also known as Ioan Bryngwyn Bach and Y Seryddwr (The Astronomer), was a Welsh amateur astronomer.

He was born at Bryngwyn Bach, Dwyran, Anglesey, and received only an elementary education. From the age of twelve, he worked as a farm labourer. He later worked as a counter of cargoes of slate as they were loaded on to ships in Bangor, in modern Gwynedd. Unusually for someone of his background, he was not only a musician and a poet but proficient in several languages. He is noted mainly for his interest in astronomy: he constructed his own telescopes – including "Jumbo", reputed to be the first silver-on-glass reflecting telescope in Wales.

He died at Bangor in 1898.

== Recognition ==
Jones was praised by Samuel Smiles in his 1884 book Men of Invention and Industry. In 2004, he was voted No. 94 in a poll of 100 Welsh Heroes organised by the BBC. A plaque in his honour has been erected by Ynys Môn County Council at Brynsiencyn.
