= Dwyran =

Village in Anglesey, Wales

Coordinates: 53.1668°N 4.3225°W

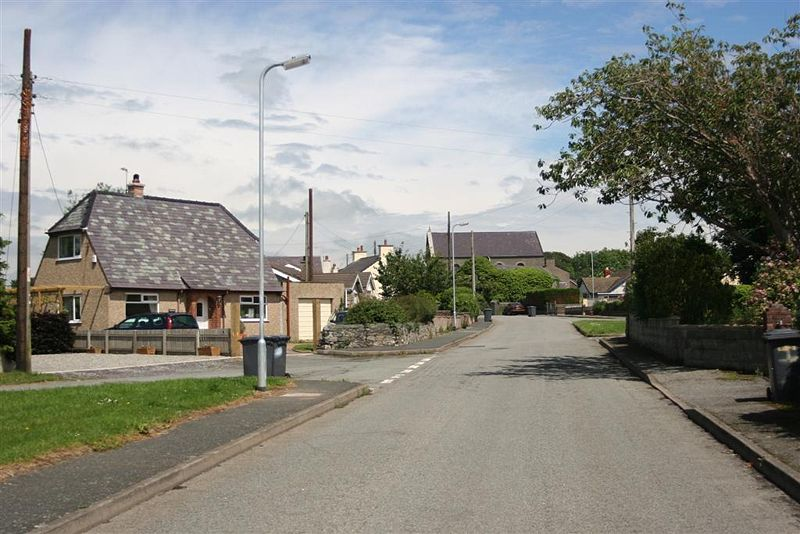

- Location within Anglesey
- Population: 603
- Principal area: Anglesey
- Preserved county: Anglesey
- Country: Wales
- Sovereign state: United Kingdom
- Post town: LLANFAIRPWLLGWYNGYLL
- Postcode district: LL61
- Police: North Wales
- Fire: North Wales
- Ambulance: Welsh
- UK Parliament: Ynys Môn
- Senedd Cymru – Welsh Parliament: Bangor Conwy Môn

Dwyran is a village on the island of Anglesey, in north-west Wales, in the community of Rhosyr. Population 2011 census was 603. The first prototype Land Rover off-road vehicle was built and tested around Dwyran and Newborough in 1947. Maurice Wilks designer of the Land Rover is buried just outside Dwyran village.

== Notable people ==
- John Jones (1818–1898), a Welsh amateur astronomer, born at Bryngwyn Bach, Dwyran
- Ren Gill (b. 1990), Welsh singer-songwriter, musician, rapper
