= Beaumaris Pier =

Pier in Beaumaris, Anglesey, North Wales

Coordinates: 53°15′40.89″N 4°5′24.31″W

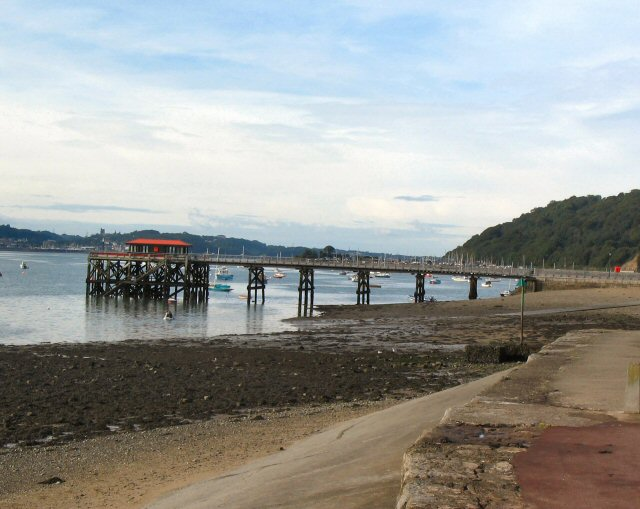
- Carries: Pedestrians
- Spans: Menai Strait
- Location: Beaumaris, Isle of Anglesey, North Wales
- Owner: Anglesey County Council

Characteristics
- Total length: 570 feet (170 m)
- No

History
- Designer: Frederick Foster
- Opening date: 1846

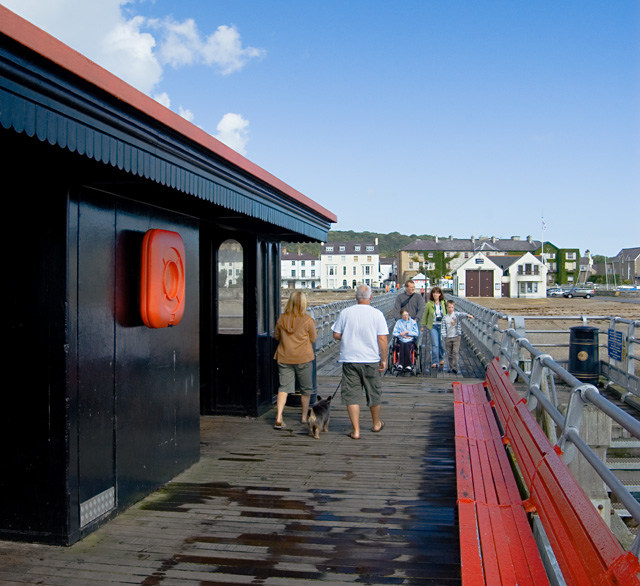
View from the 2011 refurbished pier head, towards the town of Beaumaris

Beaumaris Pier is a pier in Beaumaris, Anglesey, North Wales.

== Construction ==
Designed by Frederick Foster, it had a concrete and stone neck, wooden piles supporting iron girders, and a wooden deck. After opening in 1846, it was rebuilt in 1872 along the new classical Victorian era civil engineering lines, with screw piles made from iron, steel supporting girders and a wooden deck. In 1895, works extended its deck length to 570 feet (170 m), with a T-shaped pontoon end, a pavilion, and added a 2 ft 6 in (762 mm) railway baggage line.

== History ==
The reason for the reconstruction was to attract the pleasure steamers of the Liverpool and North Wales Steamship Company, which plied to and from Liverpool, Llandudno and the Isle of Man along the Menai Strait. An accessible pier meant that Beaumaris could compete for summer traffic alongside the similarly equipped Garth Pier at Bangor.

The most frequent steamers to call were the Snowdon, La Marguerite and St. Elvies. In the 1920s the local Sunday School regularly chartered the Snowdon for its annual trips to Llandudno. The company also provided the ferry Cynful, with regular summer service to Bangor, and evening excursions around Puffin Island.

The popularity of pleasure steamer services began to drop before World War II, due to competition from the cheaper motor bus. As a result, post-War there was some considerable deterioration to address, and with the decline in pleasure steamers, the decision was taken to demolish the T-head pontoon.

In the 1960s, through lack of maintenance, the pier became unsafe and was again threatened with demolition. But local yachtswoman and RNLI lifeboat secretary Miss Mary C. Burton, who had been mayor the decade prior, made a large private donation to ensure the pier was saved for the town. With ownership passed to Beaumaris Town Council, they restored the residual structure at a cost of £15,000, with ownership passing to the Isle of Anglesey Borough Council in 1974. They undertook additional repair works, and set aside a budget for the replacement of decaying timbers.

In August 2010, Anglesey County Council approved plans for the refurbishment of the pier, to include: reinstatement of the pier to its former width (doubling its 1960s' width); complete replacement of the decking; refurbishment of the kiosk and shelters; provision of a moveable landing pontoon, allowing its preservation during the winter storms.

== Present ==
The refurbished Beaumaris Pier was unveiled for the 2011 season. There are refurbished seats with new planking, shelters plus an end pavilion, and a dual-purpose landing stage. Visitors can buy a licence to enable Sea Fishing, and access commercial boat services to cross to Puffin Island, or travel down the Menai Strait. To the left of the piers main deck is the Blue Peter II lifeboat station. The full length of the pier was refurbished in 2011-2012 and a floating pontoon landing stage was installed at the seaward end of the pier. The works included replacing all of the timber decking and the steel beams supporting the deck, and restoring the pier to its full width. The pier was reopened in May 2012. The designer of the pier refurbishment was the Colwyn Bay office of Capita Symonds Ltd, and the contractor was BAM Nuttall Ltd.

In 2017 filming took place on the pier for the Netflix TV series Free Rein and scenes there were used in all three series.
