= Flag of Anglesey =

Flag of Welsh county

Anglesey
- Proportion: 3:5
- Adopted: March 2014
- Design: Gules a chevron Or between three lions rampant Or
- Designed by: Historic

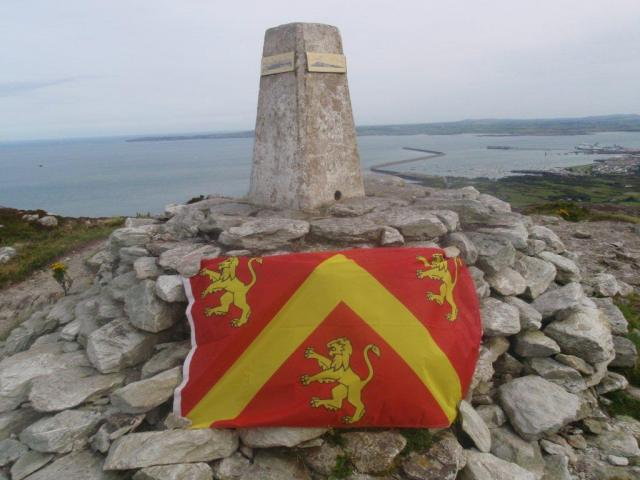
The Anglesey flag displayed on the summit of Anglesey, Holyhead Mountain

The Anglesey flag (Welsh: baner Ynys Môn) is the flag of the County of Anglesey. It was registered by the Flag Institute in March 2014. The design is based on the arms attributed to Hwfa ap Cynddelw, a 12th-century ruler from the Presaddfed Estate near Bodedern. It is a yellow chevron Fess on a red field, with three lions in a rampant attitude.

== Design ==
The design is in a 3:5 ration, a gold chevron Fess on a red field, with three lions in a rampant attitude, arranged two at the top and one at the bottom.

=== Colours ===
The colours on the flag are:

Scheme	Red	Dark red	Gold
Pantone (Paper)	186 C	188 C	109 C
Web colours	#C8102E	#76232F	#FFD100
RGB	200, 16, 46	118, 35, 47	255, 209, 0
CMYK	0%, 92%, 77%, 22%	0%, 70%, 60%, 54%	0%, 18%, 100%, 0%

== History ==
=== Early use ===
The design is a banner form of the coat of the arms ascribed by later medieval heralds, to the earlier, locally celebrated Welsh Lord Hwfa ap Cynddelw of Llifon and a steward to Owain Gwynedd Prince of the Welsh. The earliest reference to the arms seems to be in the work of the bard Lewys Glyn Cothi from the period of 1447 to 1486 although there is no evident explanation for the choice of colours or charges used. A late c. 15th-century stained-glass window with the arms referring to Hwfa are apparently depicted in the east window of Llangadwaladr church on the island. According to the heraldic historian Wilfrid Scott-Giles, Anglesey County Council used the Hwfa arms informally before they were incorporated into the design granted to them officially on April 9th, 1954. Between 1857 and 1950 the arms were used by Anglesey Constabulary. An association between the Hwfa arms and the island county of Anglesey is thus long established. The arms can be seen on the old Anglesey police court building in Valley, encircled by the words "Môn Mam Cymru", Welsh for "Anglesey, Mother of Wales". Today, the coat of arms are used by the Anglesey football team and the Worker's Union.

=== Online campaign ===
Following the German tour of Welsh dance group Dawnswyr Bro Cefni, who flew the Anglesey flag (then unofficial) while on stage, an online campaign began in 2013 - Ymgyrch Baner Sir Fôn (the Anglesey Flag Campaign), which was started by Gwyndaf Parri, a native of Anglesey who had previous had success with an online campaign to make official the neighbouring flag of Caernarfonshire. He said in the campaign:

Anglesey is a member island of the International Island Games Association but of all the islands that compete in the games, Anglesey is almost the only island which doesn't have her own flag. The people of Anglesey are very proud to be Welsh and that Anglesey is indeed known as the Mother of Wales, but Anglesey also has a special regional identity. Now that the flag has finally been registered, the next step will hopefully see flag manufacturers start producing it and it will be available to buy. We now hope that as many businesses and societies now use the flag and its use will become more widespread.”

In response to the campaign, the flag was certified by the Flag Institute on March 7th 2014.
