= Shire Hall, Llangefni =

County building in Llangefni, Wales

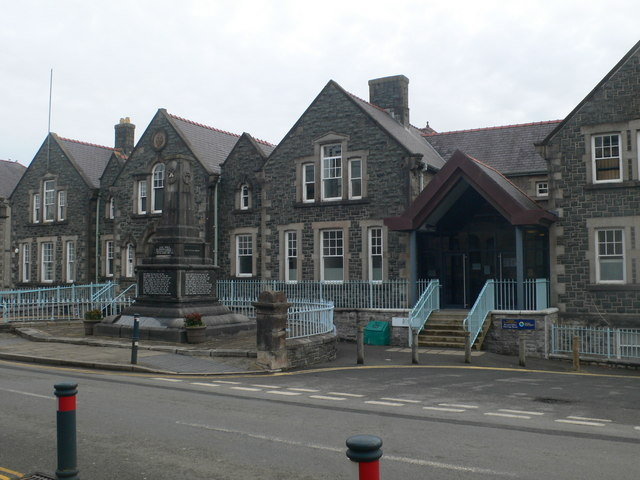
- Shire Hall, Llangefni (the five gabled bays on the left formed the original structure)

- Shown in Anglesey
- 53.2543°N 4.3113°W
- Location: Glanhwfa Road, Llangefni

History
- Built: 1899

Site notes
- Architect: Lloyd Williams
- Architectural style: Jacobethan style

Listed Building – Grade II
- Official name: Shire Hall
- Designated: 16 June 1989
- Reference no.: 5752

The Shire Hall is a municipal structure in Glanhwfa Road, Llangefni, Anglesey, Wales. The building, which served as the headquarters of Anglesey County Council, is a Grade II listed building.

== History ==
Following the implementation of the Local Government Act 1888, which established county councils in every county, it became necessary to find a meeting place for Anglesey County Council. Meetings of the county council were initially held in the county courthouse, a single-storey neoclassical style building on the west side of Glanhwfa Road dating back to the 1860s. After finding this arrangement inadequate, the county leaders decided to procure a purpose-built shire hall: the site they selected was open land on the opposite side of Glanhwfa Road.

The new building was designed by Lloyd Williams of Denbigh in the Jacobethan style, built by O. M. Roberts & Sons of Porthmadog in rubble masonry at a cost of £4,453 and was completed in 1899. The design involved a symmetrical main frontage with five gabled bays facing onto the Glanhwfa Road with the end bays slightly projected forward; the central bay, which also slightly projected forward, featured a round headed doorway with a fanlight flanked by pilasters supporting a segmental moulded surround with a keystone; there was a Venetian window on the first floor and the gable above contained a roundel with the county coat of arms. The recessed bays, on either side of the centre bay, contained sash windows on the ground floor and narrow round headed windows on the first floor. The outer bays were fenestrated by three sash windows on the ground floor and Venetian style sash windows on the first floor. Internally, the principal room was the council chamber.

The building was extended to the south by a link passage and two extra bays to a design by the county architect, Joseph Owen, in 1912. The shire hall continued to serve as the headquarters of Anglesey County Council until local government reorganisation in 1974 when the shire hall was re-designated the "Borough Council Offices" and became the headquarters of the new Ynys Mon Borough Council. At county level Anglesey was incorporated into Gwynedd in 1974 and the county council headquarters moved to Caernarfon. Brand new council offices were built at Llangefni in the 1990s for the new unitary authority, Isle of Anglesey County Council, formed in 1996. However, the shire hall continued to serve as the local registry office as well as the meeting place of Llangefni Town Council.

Isle of Anglesey County Council marketed the shire hall for sale in June 2018. The registry office moved to the Anglesey Business Centre in September 2019, and a developer, Chief Properties, acquired the property later that year. A fire, very likely started deliberately, started in the building in December 2023.
