= The Celtic Gateway =

Celtic Gateway Bridge
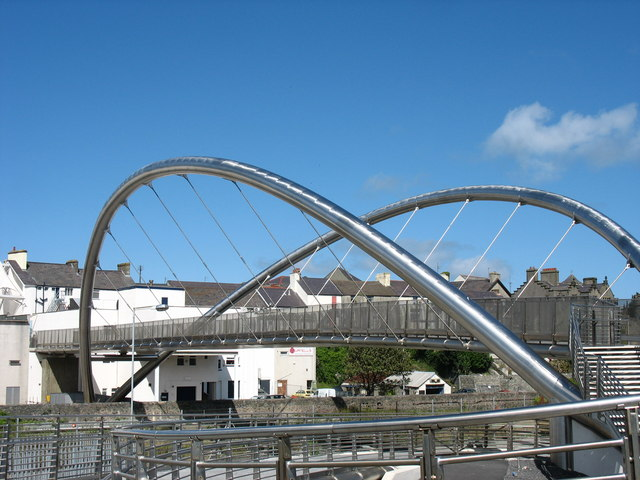
- Coordinates: 53.3095°N 4.6311°W
- Carries: Pedestrians, Bicycles
- Crosses: Old Holyhead Harbour, North Wales coastal railway line
- Locale: Anglesey, Wales, United Kingdom

Characteristics
- Design: Arch bridge
- Material: Stainless steel
- Total length: 160 metres (520 ft)
- Width: 7 metres (23 ft)

History
- Constructed by: Cimolai
- Opened: 19 October 2006

Location
- Interactive map of Celtic Gateway Bridge

The Celtic Gateway (Welsh: Porth Celtaidd) is a stainless steel pedestrian and cycle bridge located in Anglesey, Wales. It was officially opened on 19 October 2006 by Andrew Davies AM. The bridge was built to better connect Holyhead's railway station and ferry terminal with the town centre for pedestrians and cyclists. The distance between the two was originally 830 metres, including two steep inclines and the crossing of a busy road. A 1991 bridge reduced the distance to 585 metres with one steep incline but with the road crossing still needed. The current bridge has one shallow incline and cuts the distance to 280 metres with no roads to cross.

Crossing the Old Holyhead Harbour, the North Wales coastal railway line and the A5154 (formerly the end of the A5), this 160-metre-long (520 ft), 7-metre-wide (23 ft) structure was built in the futuristic architectural style by the Italian company Cimolai. The whole length of the bridge is wheelchair and pram accessible. The Gateway is further enhanced by a number of artworks. These include: "Sun boats", a series of bronze plaques which have been built into the bridge paving. The sun boat image is derived from the sun-worshipping Celts who believed it travelled across the night sky in a boat; 'Porth Celtaidd - Celtic Gateway' a series of Venetian Glass mosaic by artist Gary Drostle.

== Similar bridges ==
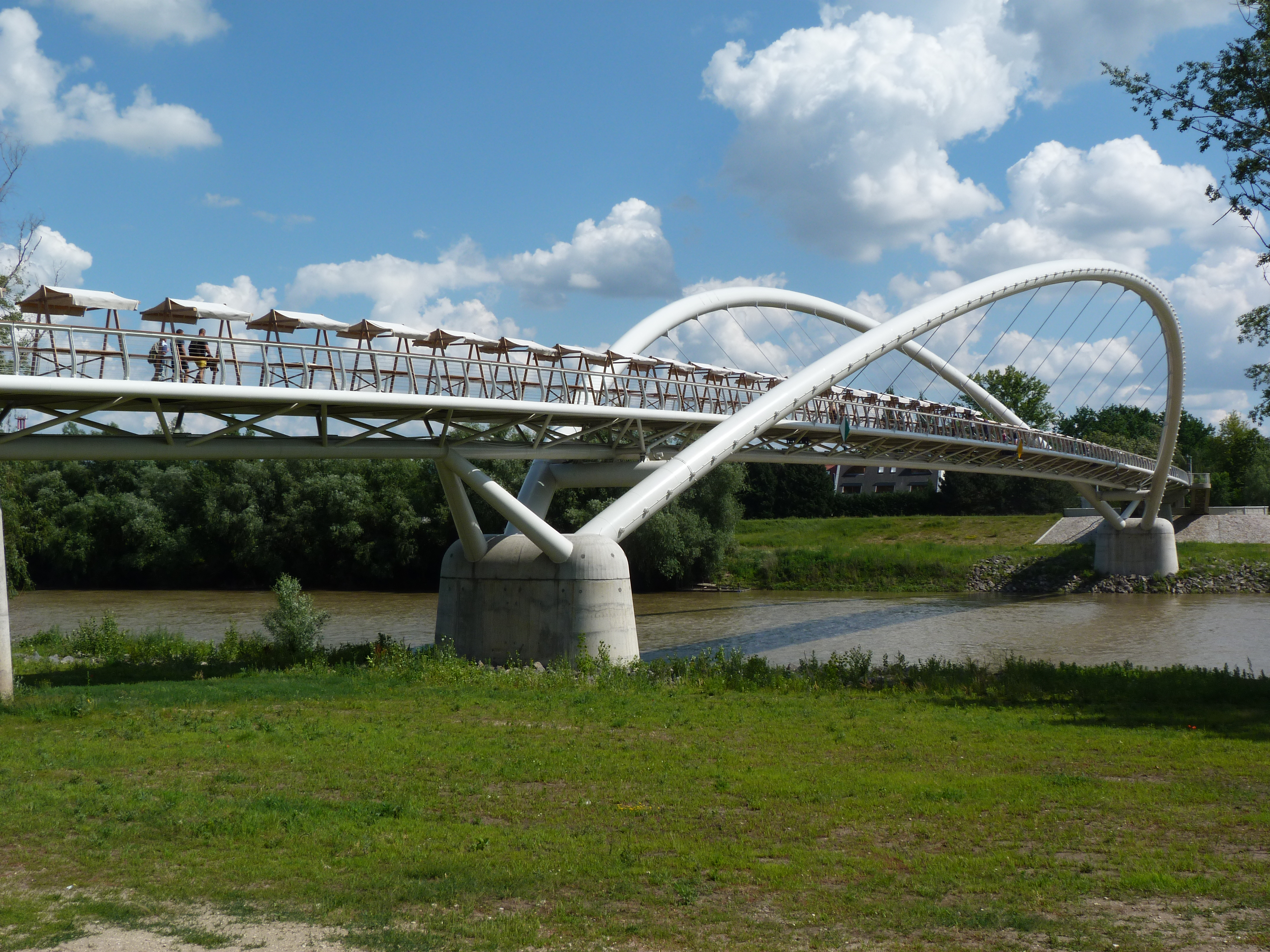
Mayfly Bridge, Szolnok, Hungary
