= Mynydd y Garn =

Hill on Anglesey, Wales

Coordinates: 53°24′N 4°30′W

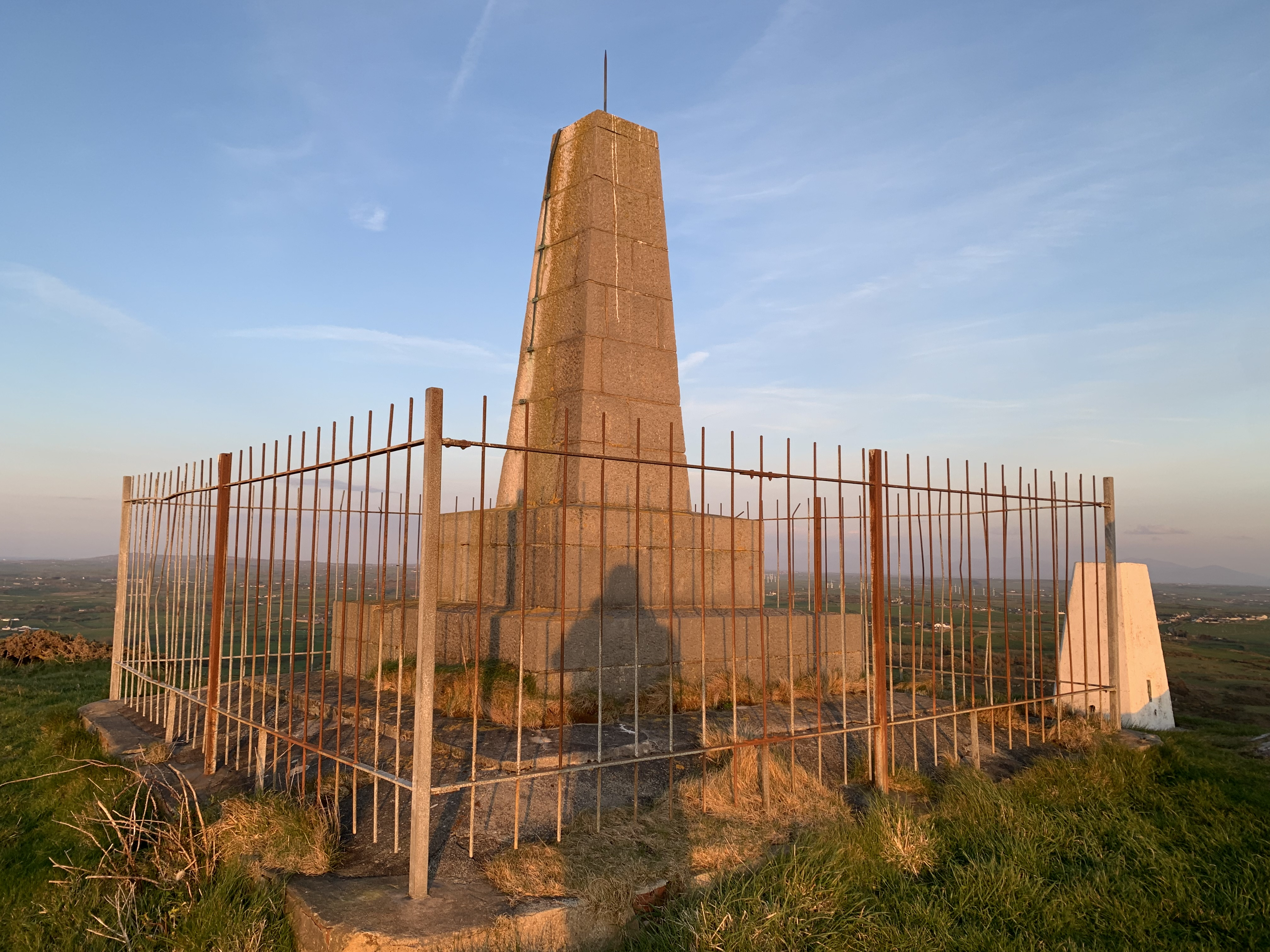

Highest point
- Elevation: 170 m (560 ft)
- Prominence: 110 m (360 ft)
- Listing: HuMP

Naming
- English translation: hill of the cairn
- Language of name: Welsh

Geography
- Location: Anglesey, Wales
- OS grid: SH315907
- Topo map: OS Landranger 114 / Explorer 262

Mynydd y Garn is a hill in the northwest of the Isle of Anglesey in north Wales. Its 170 m (560 ft) high summit is crowned by a trig point and a stone obelisk. Erected in 1897 it commemorates Sir William Thomas, ship-owner and one time High Sheriff of Anglesey.

== Geology ==
The summit of the hill is formed from Ordovician sandstone whilst Gwna Group schists outcrop on its southern slopes. To their south are New Harbour Group schists and psammites. Surrounding lower land is mantled by glacial till though the hill itself is free from such superficial deposits.

== Access ==
The summit area of the hill is owned by the National Trust and thereby open to free public access on foot. A couple of public footpaths run across its western slopes but access to the summit is gained from a minor road to its west by a short permissive path.
