= MV Balmoral =

A number of motor vessels have been named MV Balmoral, including:

- MV Balmoral (1949), an excursion ship
- MV Balmoral (2008), a cruise ship
