= 100 Great Welsh Women =

Factual book by Terry Breverton

- Cover of 2001 paperback edition
- Author: Terry Breverton
- Language: English
- Genre: Biography
- Publisher: Glyndwr Publishing
- Publication date: 2 November 2001
- Publication place: Wales
- Media type: Paperback
- Pages: 304
- ISBN: 9781903529041

100 Great Welsh Women is a collection of short biographies of prominent women from Wales, or of Welsh origin, published in 2001 by Terry Breverton. It covers women from all walks of life, including athletes, actresses, saints, singers and queens.

== Background ==
100 Great Welsh Women was written by Terry Breverton and published in 2001. Breverton is a historian who has written more than 20 books. The books are typically on subjects related to Wales and include 100 Great Welshmen, An A-Z of Wales and the Welsh, The Secret Vale of Glamorgan and The Book of Welsh Saints.

== Content and style ==
The book opens with a biography of the 5th–6th century Saint Almedha and ends with the 19th century Jane Williams. The book includes biographies of Tracy Edwards, yachtswoman, who in 1997 traveled 1,516 miles (2,440 km) in four days across the Atlantic with a 10-woman crew; Petula Clark, the popular singer; Megan Lloyd George, the politician and feminist; Queen Elizabeth I of England; Bette Davis, the film star; Saint Claudia; Saint Darerca and the famous Queen Boudica, who led British resistance against the Romans. Other biographies include the singers Charlotte Church and Shirley Bassey; the athlete Tanni Grey-Thompson; Nell Gwyn, the mistress of Charles II; Saint Helena, mother of Constantine the Great; and the actress Catherine Zeta-Jones. Also covered are Kylie Minogue, Nest ferch Rhys, George Eliot, Sarah Siddons, Siân Phillips, Laura Ashley, Mary Quant, Myrna Loy and Esther Williams.

The book is carefully researched and well written. The selection of subjects is somewhat idiosyncratic, and readers may disagree with the author's choice. For example, Breverton states that he chose to exclude Margaret Roberts, better known as Margaret Thatcher, due to his dislike of that famous Prime Minister's policies.

== Publication ==
100 Great Welsh Women was published as a paperback by Glyndwr Publishing, St. Athan, in November 2001. It has 304 pages, and includes 72 black-and-white photographs. As of 2016 it was out of print.

== Reception ==
The book gained attention in the media mainly because it included the Australian pop star Kylie Minogue. Meic Stephens wrote of 100 Great Welshmen and 100 Great Welsh Women in the Western Mail Magazine on 16 March 2002, "These are not necessarily books that you want to read from cover to cover, but to browse in ... Both are really extraordinary achievements by a single author whose industry and enterprise seem to show no bounds." Norma Penfold of the Welsh Books Council wrote, "All in all, 100 Great Welsh Women is an informative reference book as well as a fascinating read." Jonathan Hourigan wrote in the Sunday Express, "Breverton's breadth, generosity and sheer enthusiasm about Wales are compelling." According to Dr Peter N. Williams, "The book is an absolute must for all those who value their Welsh heritage, and for all those who wish to see Welsh women accorded their rightful place in history."

== Sources ==
- Breverton, Terry (30 October 2012), Wales: A Historical Companion, Amberley Publishing Limited, ISBN 978-1-4456-0990-4
- Breverton, Terry (23 August 2012), Reason behind lack of female statues, BBC
- Helmich, Jane (29 December 2001), "New Book: 100 Great Welsh Women contains some surprises!", Daily Mirror, archived from the original on 7 February 2016
- Hourigan, Jonathan (20 January 2002), "Women in the Hillside", Sunday Express Books Review, archived from the original on 7 February 2016
- Penfold, Norma, "100 Great Welsh Women", Gwales, A review from www.gwales.com, with the permission of the Welsh Books Council, archived from the original on 1 April 2020
- Stephens, Meic (16 March 2002), "review: '100 Great Welshmen' and '100 Great Welsh Women'", Western Mail Magazine, archived from the original on 7 February 2016
- Williams, Dr Peter N. (1 January 2002), "review: '100 Great Welsh Women'", Ninnau (The North American Welsh Newspaper), archived from the original on 7 February 2016
