= Anglesey =

Island county in Wales

Isle of Anglesey Ynys Môn (Welsh)
- County
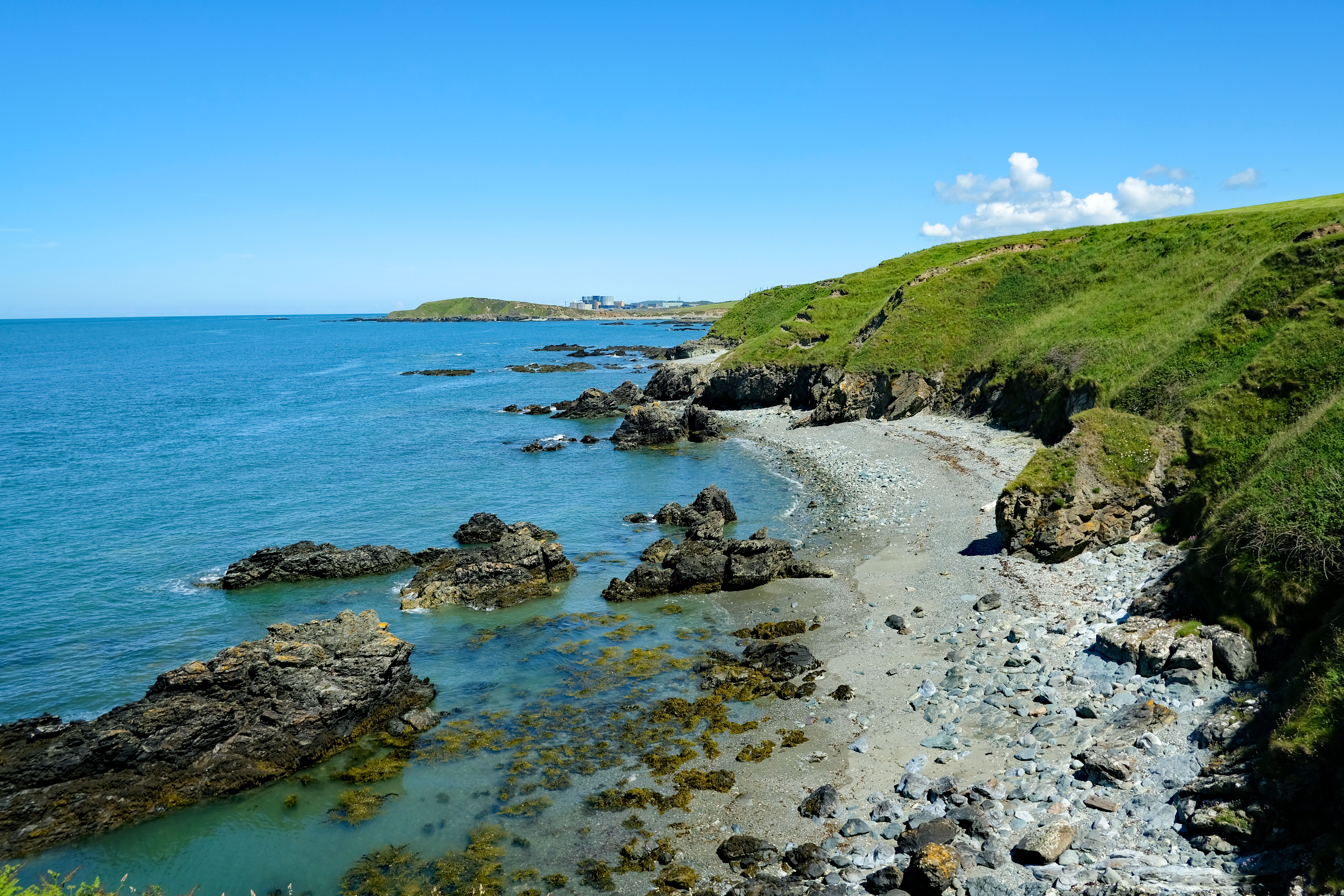
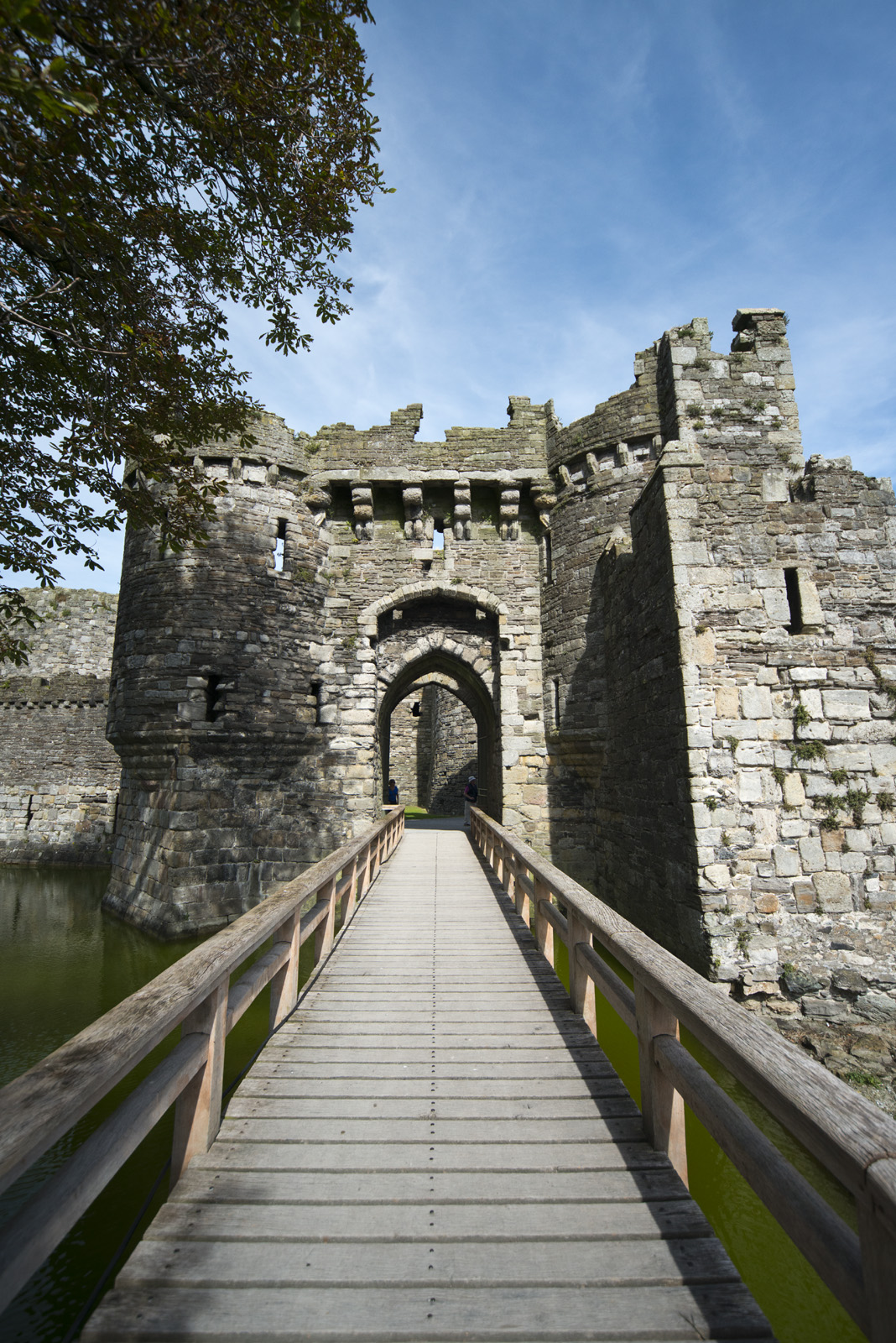
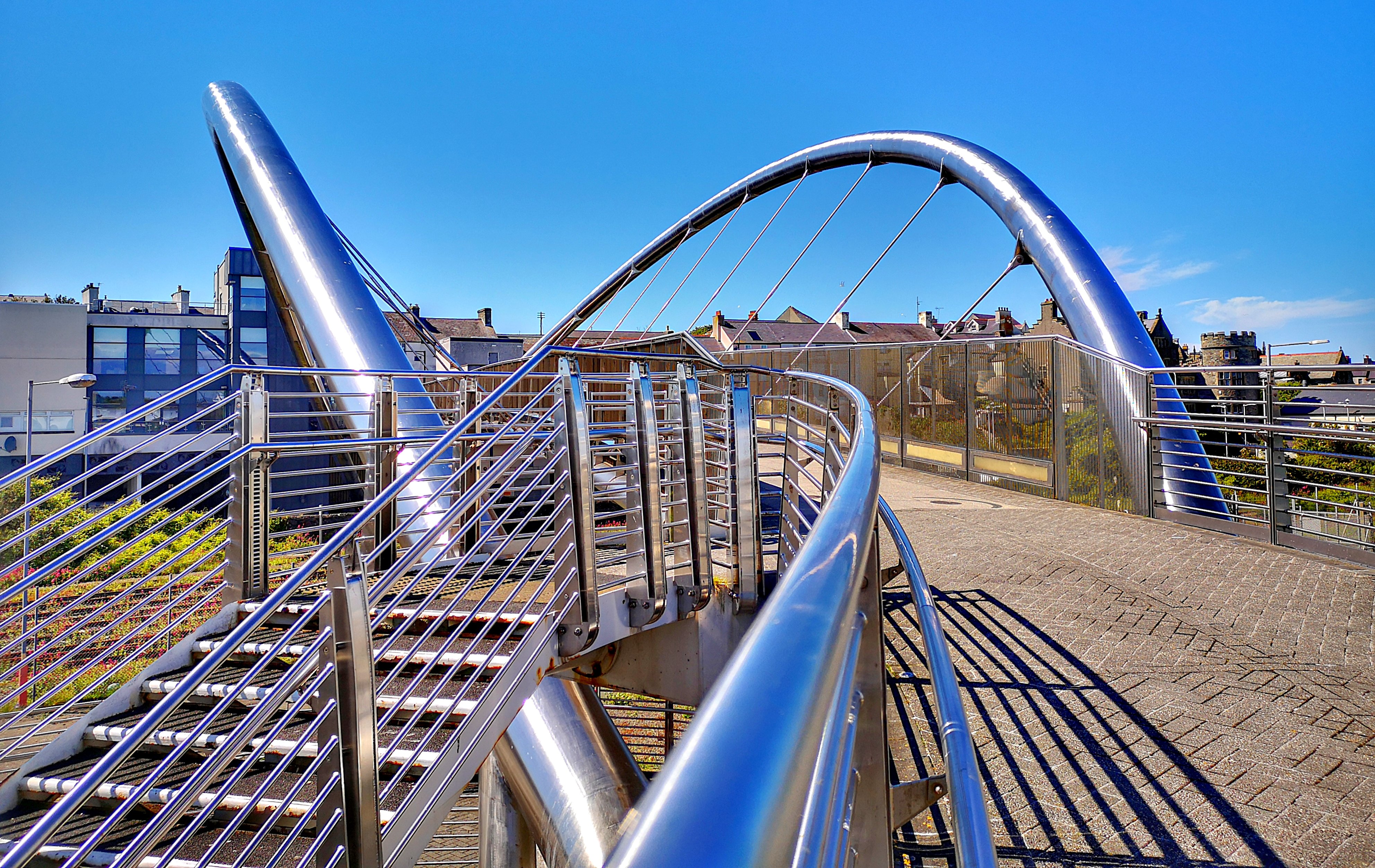
- Left to right: View on the coastal path towards Wylfa; Beaumaris Castle; The Celtic Gateway in Holyhead

- Flag Coat of arms
- Motto: Welsh: Môn Mam Cymru, lit. 'Anglesey Mother of Wales'
- Anglesey (county) shown within Wales
- Coordinates: 53°17′N 4°20′W
- Sovereign state: United Kingdom
- Country: Wales
- Preserved county: Gwynedd
- Incorporated: 1 April 1974
- Unitary authority: 1 April 1996
- Administrative HQ: Llangefni

Government
  - Type: Principal council
  - Body: Isle of Anglesey County Council
  - Control: Plaid Cymru
  - MPs: Llinos Medi (PC)
  - MSs: 6 in Bangor Conwy Môn

Area
  - Total: 275 sq mi (712 km^{2})
  - Rank: 9th

Population (2025)
  - Total: 68,607
  - Rank: 20th
  - Density: 250/sq mi (96/km^{2})

Welsh language (2021)
  - Speakers: 55.8%
  - Rank: 2nd
- Time zone: UTC+0 (GMT)
  - Summer (DST): UTC+1 (BST)
- ISO 3166 code: GB-AGY
- GSS code: W06000001
- Website: anglesey.gov.wales

Anglesey (/ˈæŋɡəlsi/ ANG-gəl-see), or Ynys Môn (Welsh: [ˈənɨs ˈmoːn]), is an island off the north-west coast of Wales. It forms the majority of the county of the Isle of Anglesey, which also includes Holy Island to the west and some islets and skerries. The county borders Gwynedd across the Menai Strait to the south-east and is otherwise surrounded by the Irish Sea. Holyhead is the largest town, and the administrative centre is Llangefni.

The county has an area of 275 square miles (712 km^{2}) and had a population of 68,607 in 2025. Holyhead is on the north coast of Holy Island. Llangefni is in the centre of Anglesey; other settlements include Amlwch on the north coast and Beaumaris, Menai Bridge and Llanfairpwllgwyngyll on the Menai Strait. The economy of the county is mostly based on agriculture, energy, and tourism, the latter especially on the coast. Holyhead is also a major ferry port for Dublin, Ireland. The county has the second-highest percentage of Welsh speakers in Wales, at 57.2%, and is considered a heartland of the language. The county is part of the preserved county of Gwynedd.

The island of Anglesey, at 261 square miles (676 km^{2}), is the largest in Wales and the Irish Sea and the seventh largest in Britain. The northern and eastern coasts of the island are rugged, and the southern and western coasts are generally gentler; the interior is gently undulating. In the north of the island is Llyn Alaw, a reservoir with an area of 1.4 square miles (4 km^{2}), which supplies drinking water to the northern half of the island. Holy Island has a similar landscape, with a rugged north and west coast and beaches to the east and south. The two larger islands are surrounded by smaller islands; several, including South Stack and Puffin Island, are home to seabird colonies. Large parts of the county's coastline have been designated an Area of Outstanding Natural Beauty. Since 2015 the whole county has been designated as a UNESCO Global Geopark for its unique and wide-ranging geology.

The county has many prehistoric monuments, such as Bryn Celli Ddu burial chamber. The medieval House of Aberffraw, which ruled the Kingdom of Gwynedd until 1283, originated on Anglesey and maintained courts on the island at Aberffraw and Rhosyr. After the Conquest of Wales by Edward I, Beaumaris Castle was constructed at the south-eastern corner of Anglesey; today it is part of the Castles and Town Walls of King Edward in Gwynedd World Heritage Site. During the nineteenth century the Menai Strait to the mainland was spanned by two bridges: the Menai Suspension Bridge, designed by Thomas Telford in 1826, and the Britannia Bridge, originally designed by Robert Stephenson in 1850.

== Toponymy ==
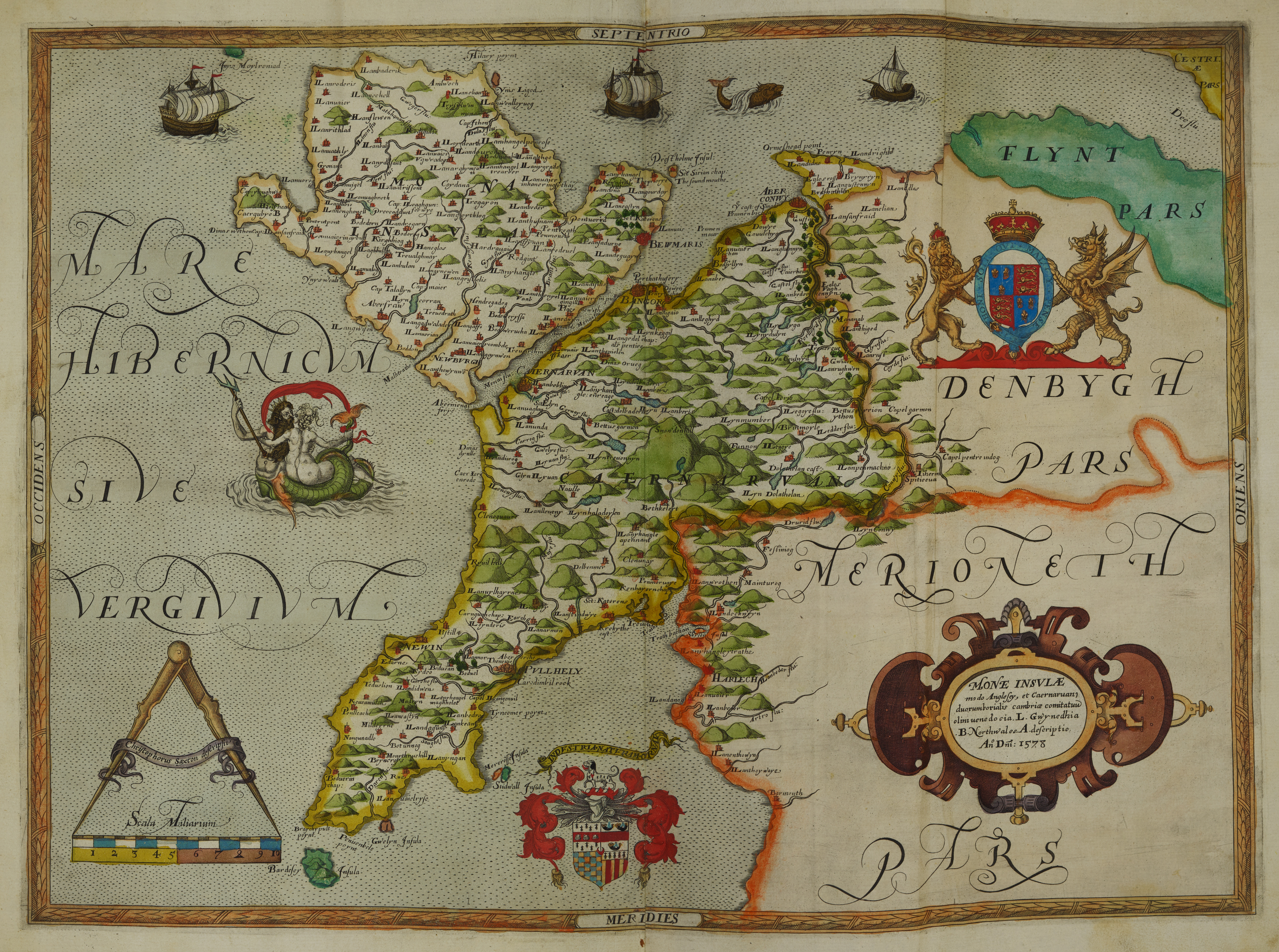
Hand-drawn map of Anglesey and Caernarfonshire by Christopher Saxton from 1578

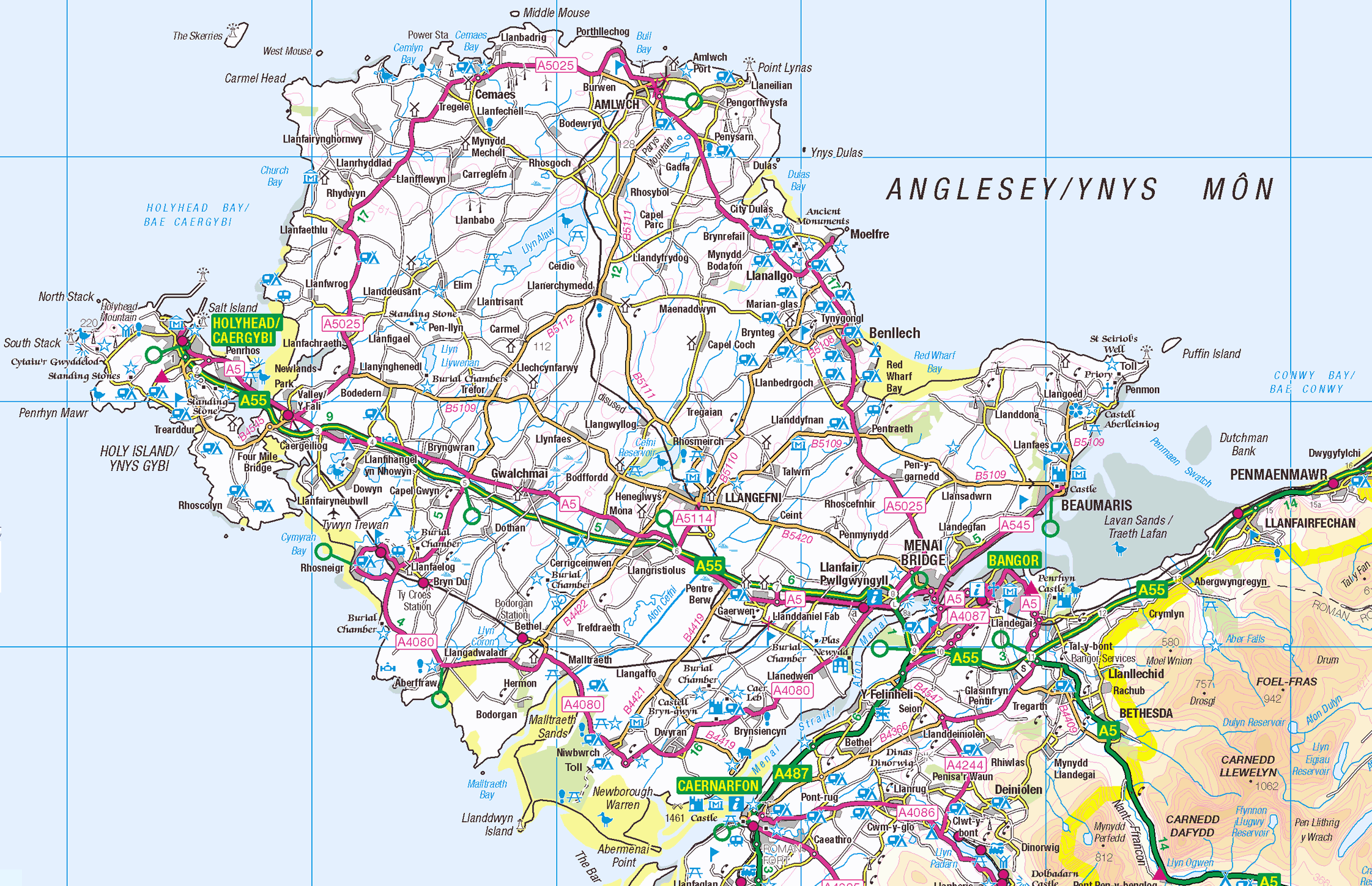
Ordnance Survey map of Anglesey

The English name for Anglesey might be derived from the Old Norse, either Ǫngullsey "Hook Island" or Ǫnglisey "Ǫngli's Island". No record of such an Ǫngli survives, but the place name was used by Viking raiders as early as the 10th century and later adopted by the Normans during their invasions of Gwynedd. The traditional folk etymology reading the name as the "Island of the Angles (English)" may account for its Norman use but has no merit; the Angles' name itself is probably cognate with the shape of the Angeln peninsula. All of them ultimately derive from the proposed Proto-Indo-European root *ank- ("to flex, bend, angle"). Throughout the 18th and 19th centuries and into the 20th, it was usually spelt Anglesea in documents, a spelling that is still occasionally used today.

Ynys Môn, the island and county's Welsh name, first appeared in the Latin Mona of various Roman sources. It was likewise known to the Saxons as Monez. The Brittonic original was in the past taken to have meant "Island of the Cow".

The name is probably cognate with the Gaelic name of the Isle of Man, Mannin (Manaw in Welsh), usually derived from a Celtic word for 'mountain' (reflected in Welsh mynydd, Breton menez and Scottish Gaelic monadh), from a Proto-Celtic *moniyos.

Poetic names for the island of Anglesey include the Old Welsh Ynys Dywyll (Shady or Dark Isle) for its former groves and Ynys y Cedairn (Isle of the Brave) for its royal courts; Gerald of Wales' Môn Mam Cymru ("Môn, Mother of Wales") for its agricultural productivity; and Y fêl Ynys (Honey Isle).

== History ==
=== Prehistory ===
The history of the settlement of the local people of Anglesey starts in the Mesolithic period. Anglesey and Great Britain were uninhabitable until after the last ice age. It was not until 12,000 years ago that the island of Great Britain became hospitable. The oldest excavated sites on Anglesey include Trwyn Du (Welsh: Black nose) at Aberffraw. The Mesolithic site located at Aberffraw Bay (Porth Terfyn) was buried underneath a Bronze Age 'kerb cairn' which was constructed c. 2000 BC. The bowl barrow (kerb cairn) covered a material deposited from the early Mesolithic period; the archeological find dates to 7000 BC. After millennia of hunter-gather civilisation in the British Isles, the first villages were constructed from 4000 BC. Neolithic settlements were built in the form of long houses, and one of the first villages in Wales was built at Llanfaethlu on Anglesey. Another example of a permanent settlement on Anglesey is the Bronze Age burial mound, Bryn Celli Ddu (English: Dark Grove Hill). The mound started as a henge enclosure around 3000 BC and was adapted several times over a millennium.

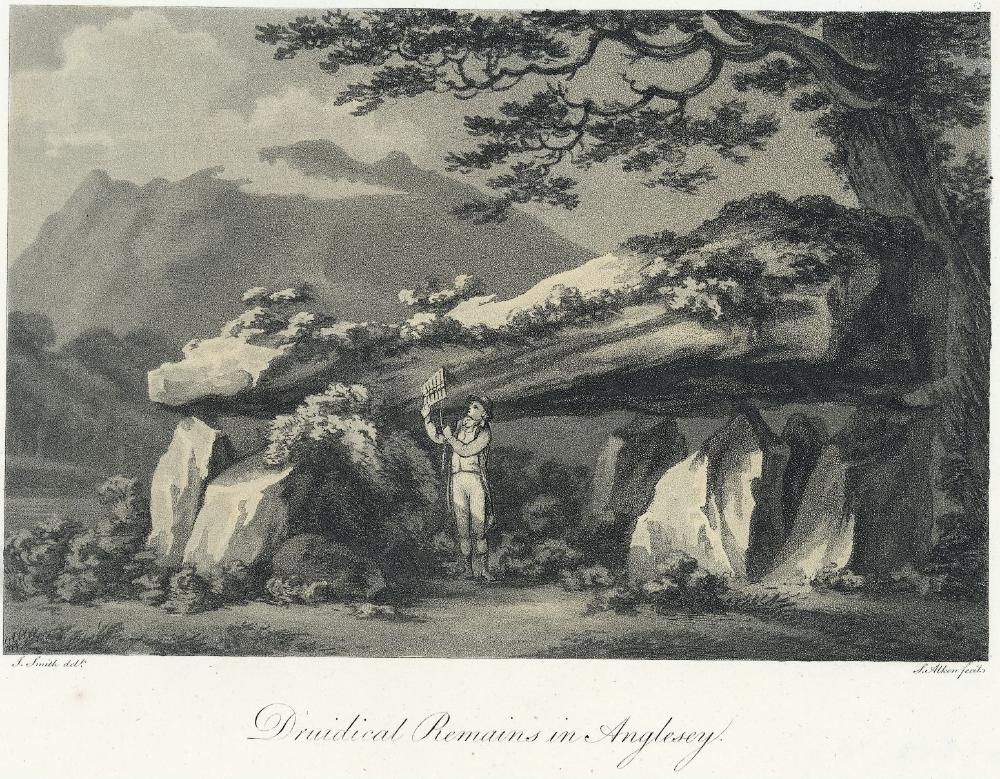
Dolmen on Anglesey (Samuel Alken, 1794)

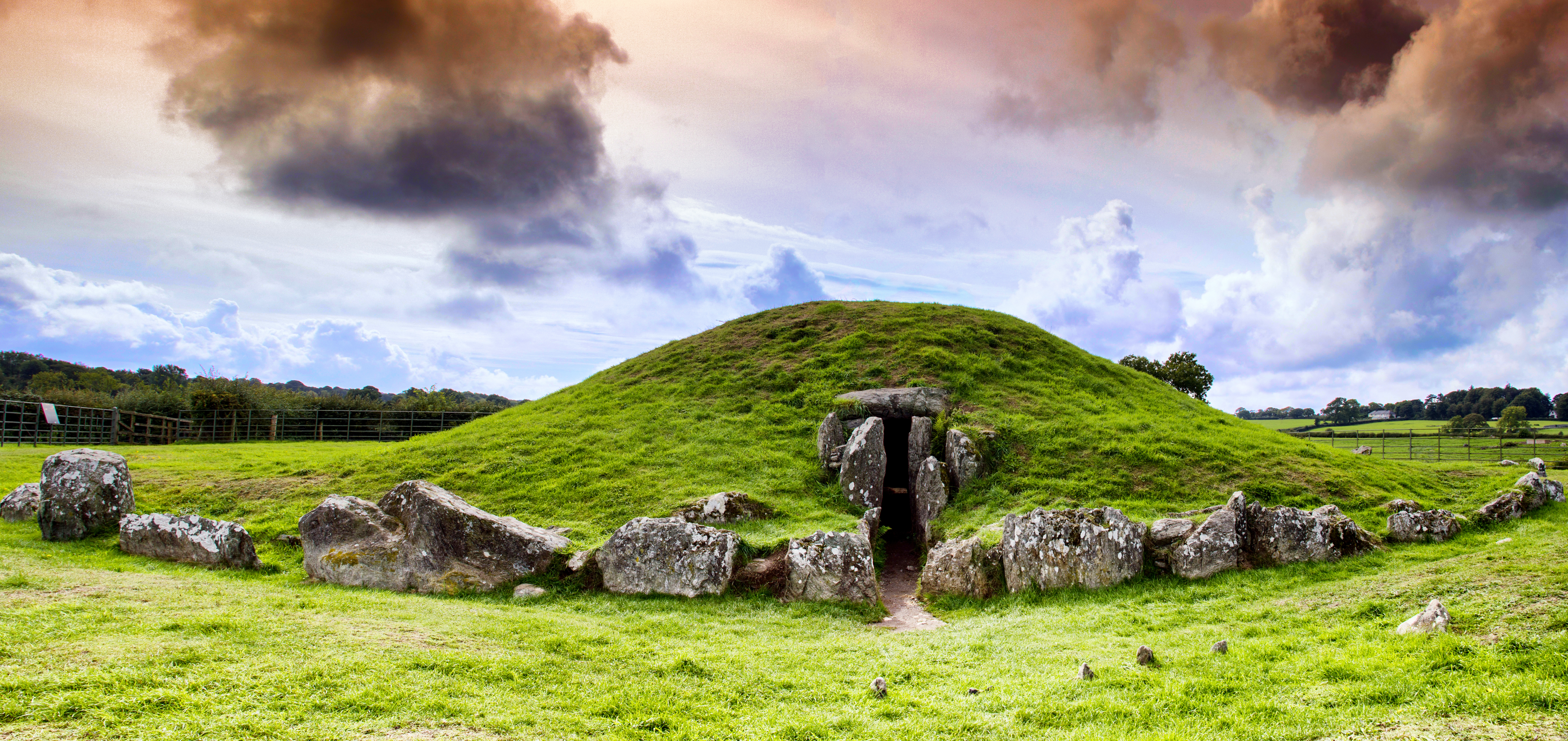
Bryn Celli Ddu burial chamber, Anglesey

There are numerous megalithic monuments and menhirs in the county, testifying to the presence of humans in prehistory. Plas Newydd is near one of 28 cromlechs that remain on uplands overlooking the sea. The Welsh Triads claim that the island of Anglesey was once part of the mainland.

==== Bronze Age to Roman times ====
After the Neolithic age, the Bronze Age began (c. 2200 BC – 800 BC). Some sites were continually used for thousands of years from original henge enclosures, then during the Iron Age, and also some of these sites were later adapted by Celts into hillforts and finally were in use during the Roman period (c. 100 AD) as roundhouses. Castell Bryn Gwyn (English: White hill castle, also called Bryn Beddau, or the "hill of graves") near Llanidan, Anglesey is an example of a Neolithic site that became a hillfort that was used until the Roman period by the Ordovices, the local tribe who were defeated in battle by a Roman legion (c. 78 AD). Bronze Age monuments were also built throughout the British Isles. During this period, the Mynydd Bach cairn in South-west Anglesey was being used. It is a Beaker period prehistoric funerary monument.

During the Iron Age the Celts built dwellings huts, also known as roundhouses. These were established near the previous settlements. Some huts with walled enclosures were discovered on the banks of the river (Welsh: afon) Gwna near. An example of a well-preserved hut circle is over the Cymyran Strait on Holy Island. The Holyhead Mountain Hut Circles (Welsh: Tŷ Mawr / Cytiau'r Gwyddelod, Big house / "Irishmen's Huts") were inhabited by ancient Celts and were first occupied before the Iron Age, c. 1000 BC. The Anglesey Iron Age began after 500 BC. Archeological research discovered limpet shells which were found from 200 BC on a wall at Tŷ Mawr and Roman-era pottery from the 3rd to 4th centuries AD. Some of these huts were still being used for agricultural purposes as late as the 6th century. The first excavation of Ty Mawr was conducted by William Owen Stanley of Penrhos, Anglesey (son of Baron Stanley of Alderley).

=== Modern Anglesey ===
==== Roman occupation ====
Historically, Anglesey has long been associated with the druids. The Roman conquest of Anglesey began in 60 AD when the Roman general Gaius Suetonius Paulinus, determined to break the power of the druids, attacked the island using his amphibious Batavian contingent as a surprise vanguard assault and then destroyed the shrine and the nemeta (sacred groves). News of Boudica's revolt reached him just after his victory, causing him to withdraw his army before consolidating his conquest. The island was finally brought into the Roman Empire by Gnaeus Julius Agricola, the Roman governor of Britain, in 78 AD. During the Roman occupation, the area was notable for the mining of copper. The foundations of Caer Gybi, a fort in Holyhead, are Roman, and the present road from Holyhead to Llanfairpwllgwyngyll was originally a Roman road. The island was grouped by Ptolemy with Ireland ("Hibernia") rather than with Britain ("Albion").

==== Kingdom of Gwynedd and House of Aberffraw ====
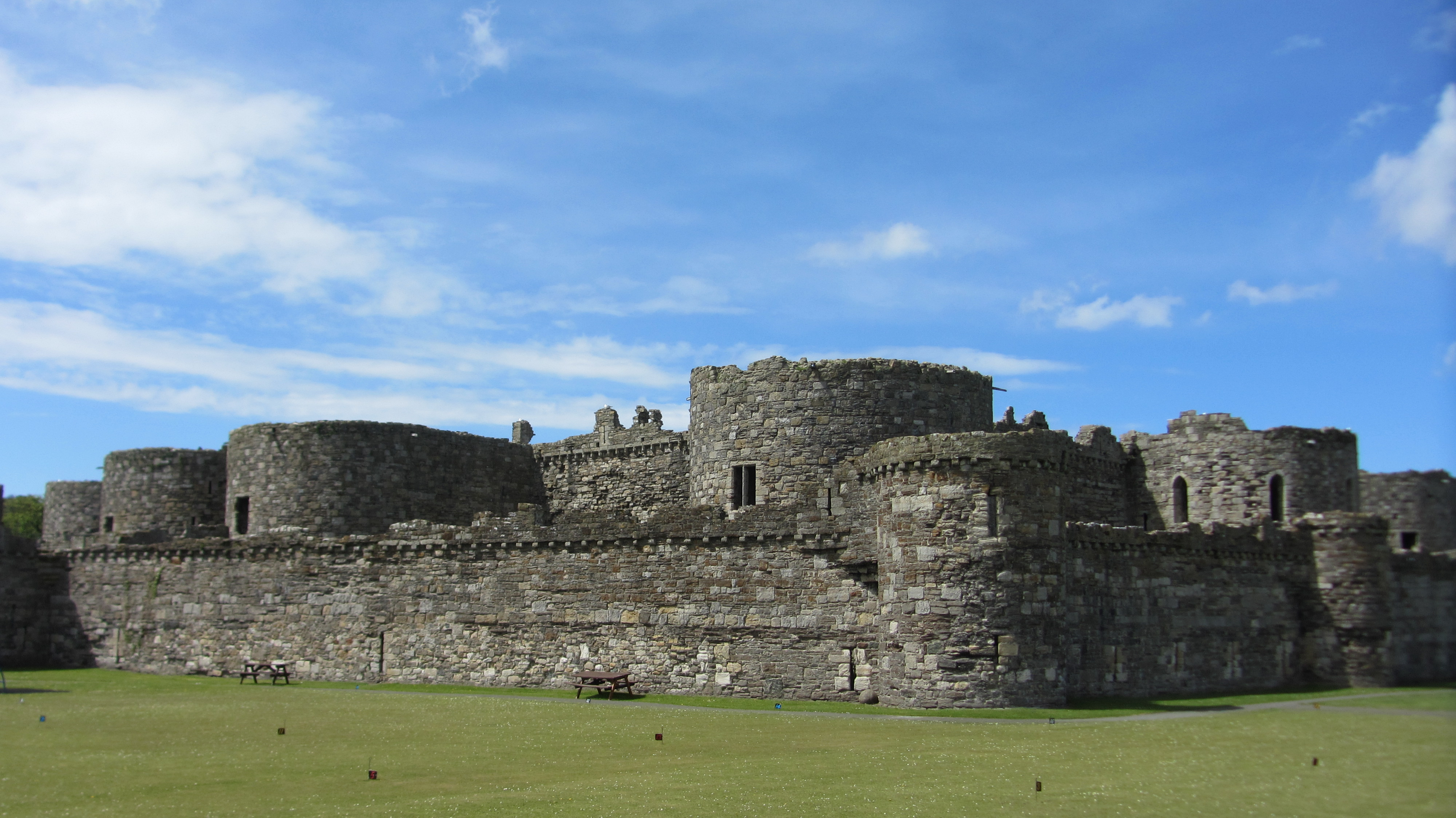
Beaumaris Castle, constructed after 1294

After the Roman departure from Britain in the early 5th century, pirates from Ireland colonised Anglesey and the nearby Llŷn Peninsula. In response to this, Cunedda ap Edern, a Gododdin warlord from Scotland, came to the area and began to drive the Irish out. This was continued by his son Einion Yrth ap Cunedda and grandson Cadwallon Lawhir ap Einion; the last Irish invaders were finally defeated in battle in 470.

During the 9th century, King Rhodri Mawr unified Wales and separated the country into at least 3 provinces between his sons. He gave Gwynedd to his son, Anarawd ap Rhodri, who founded the medieval Welsh dynasty, The House of Aberffraw on Anglesey. The island had a good defensive position, and so Aberffraw became the site of the royal court (Welsh: Llys) of the Kingdom of Gwynedd. Apart from devastating Danish raids in 853 and 968 in Aberffraw, it remained the capital until the 13th century, after Rhodri Mawr had moved his family seat from Caernarfon and built a royal palace at Aberffraw in 873. This is when improvements to the English navy made the location indefensible. Anglesey was also briefly the most southerly possession of the Norwegian Empire.

After the Irish, the island was invaded by Vikings—some raids were noted in famous sagas (see Menai Strait History) such as the Jómsvíkinga—and by Saxons, and Normans, before falling to Edward I of England in the 13th century. The connection with the Vikings can be seen in the name of the island. In ancient times it was called "Maenige" and received the name "Ongulsey" or Angelsoen, from where the current name originates.

Anglesey (with Holy Island) is one of the 13 historic counties of Wales. In medieval times, before the conquest of Wales in 1283, Môn often had periods of temporary independence, when frequently bequeathed to the heirs of kings as a sub-kingdom of Gwynedd, an example of this was Llywelyn ap Iorwerth (Llywelyn I, the Great c. 1200s) who was styled the Prince of Aberffraw. After the Norman invasion of Wales was one of the last times this occurred a few years after 1171, after the death of Owain Gwynedd, when the island was inherited by Rhodri ab Owain Gwynedd, and between 1246 and about 1255 when it was granted to Owain Goch as his share of the kingdom. After the conquest of Wales by Edward I, Anglesey became a county under the terms of the Statute of Rhuddlan of 1284. Hitherto it had been divided into the cantrefi of Aberffraw, Rhosyr and Cemaes.

During 1294 as a rebellion of the former house of Aberffraw, Prince Madog ap Llywelyn had attacked King Edward I's castles in North Wales. As a direct response, Beaumaris Castle was constructed to control Edward's interests in Anglesey, but by the 1320s the build was abandoned and never complete. The castle was besieged by Owain Glyndŵr in the early 15th century. It was ruinous by 1609; however, the 6th Viscount Bulkeley purchased the castle from the Crown in 1807 and it has been open to the public under the guardianship of the Crown ever since 1925.

==== 17th to 20th centuries ====
Due to its geographic proximity, Anglesey (and particularly Holyhead) enjoyed close cultural ties with Ireland throughout the later parts of this period. A 2023 study in The Welsh History Review by historian Adam N. Coward highlights the interconnectedness of landed gentry families in Ireland and Anglesey between the 17th and 20th centuries, with connections ranging from close geographical proximity and shared transport networks to marriage and family ties. One example, the article notes, is that in 1663 the Duke of Ormonde wrote from Dublin Castle to Lord Bulkley of Baron Hill, Anglesey, who had been created Viscount Bulkeley of Cashel in 1644, about bringing partridges from Anglesey to Ireland for a hunt.

=== 20th century ===
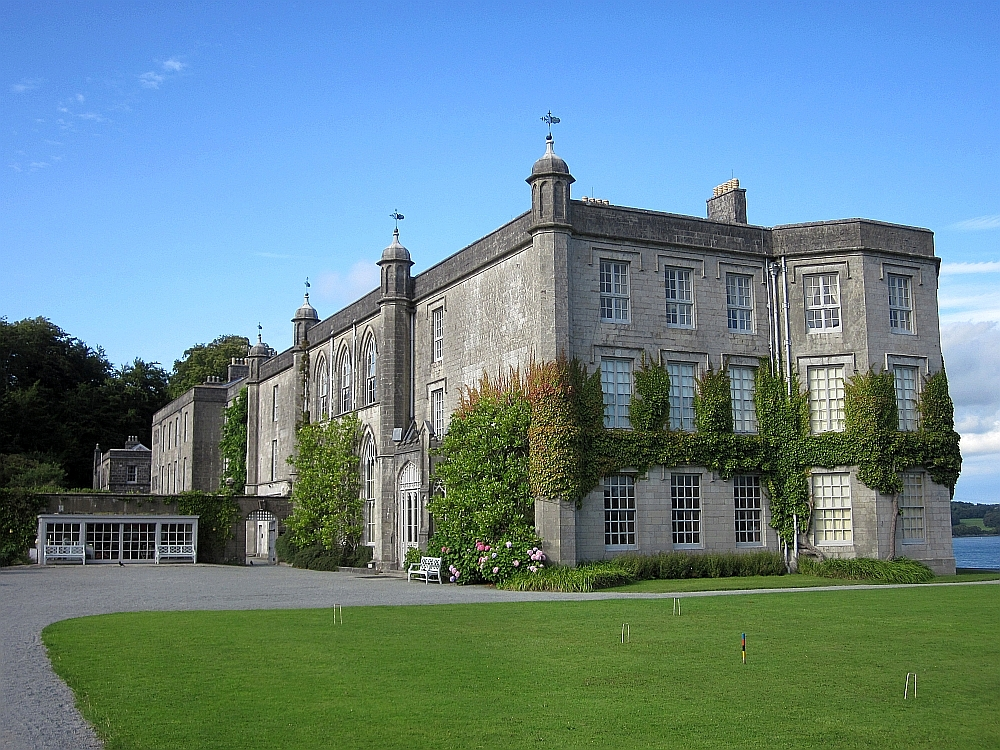
Plas Newydd, Anglesey constructed by 19th century

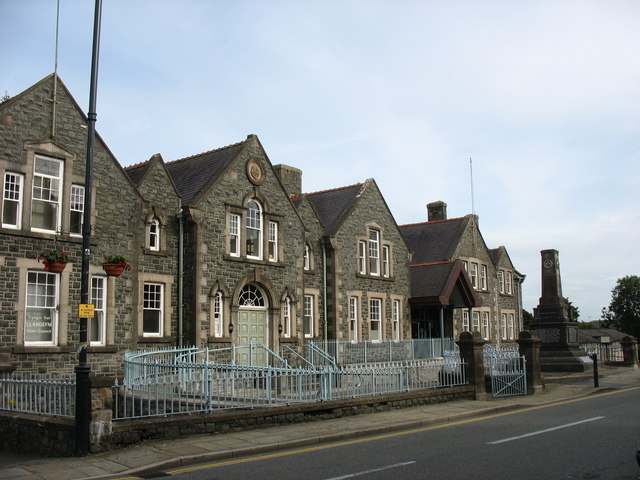
Shire Hall, Llangefni

The Shire Hall in Llangefni was completed in 1899. During the First World War, the Presbyterian minister and celebrity preacher, John Williams, toured the island as part of an effort to recruit young men as volunteers. The island's location made it ideal for monitoring German U-Boats in the Irish Sea, with half a dozen airships based at Mona. German POWs were kept on the island. By the end of the war, some 1,000 of the island's men had died on active service.

In 1936 the NSPCC opened its first branch on Anglesey.

During the Second World War, Anglesey received Italian POWs. The island was designated a reception zone, and was home to evacuee children from Liverpool and Manchester.

In 1971, a 100,000 ton per annum aluminum smelter was opened by Rio Tinto Zinc Corporation and British Insulated Callender's Cables with Kaiser Aluminum and Chemical Corporation as a 30 per cent partner.

== Governance ==
In 1974, Anglesey became a district of the new county of Gwynedd known under the name “Anglesey-Ynys Môn”. Until 1974, Anglesey was divided into civil parishes for the purpose of local government; these in large part equated to ecclesiastical parishes (see the table below), most of which still exist as part of the Church in Wales.

=== Parishes ===
(chapelries are listed in italics)

Hundred	Parishes
Llyfon/Lyfon	Bodedern • Bodwrog • Ceirchiog • Caergybi/Holyhead • Llanbeulan (Tal-y-llyn) • Llandrygarn • Llanfaelog • Llanfair-yn-neubwll • Llanfihangel-yn-Nhowyn • Llantrisant (Llanllibio) • Llanynghenedl • Llechgynfarwy • Llechylched • Trewalchmai
Malltraeth	Aberffraw • Cerrigceinwen • Heneglwys • Llangadwaladr • Llangristiolus • Llangwyfan • Trefdraeth
Menai	Gwredog^{1} • Llanddaniel Fab • Llanddwyn • Llanedwen • Llanffinan • Llanfihangel Ysgeifiog • Llangaffo • Llangefni • Llangeinwen • Llangwyllog • Llanidan (Llanfair-yn-y-Cwmwd) • Llannerch-y-medd • Newborough/Niwbwrch • Rhodogeidio • Rhoscolyn • Tregaian/Tregayan
Tal-y-bolion	Llanbabo • Llanbadrig • Llanddeusant/Llandausaint • Llanfachraeth/Llanfachreth • Llanfaethlu (Llanfwrog) • Llanfair-yng-Nghornwy • Llanfechell • Llanfflewyn • Llanfugail • Llanrhwydrys • Llanrhyddlad
Twrcelyn	Amlwch • Coedana • Llanallgo • Llandyfrydog • Llaneilian (Bodewryd • Llaneuddog) • Llaneugrad • Llanfihangel Tre'r Beirdd • Llanwenllwyfo • Penrhoslligwy (Capel Lligwy) • Rhosbeirio
Tyndaethwy	Llanbedrgoch • Llanddona • Llanddyfnan • Llandegfan (Beaumaris/Biwmares) • Llandysilio • Llanfaes • Llanfair Betws Geraint • Llanfair Mathafarn Eithaf • Llanfair Pwllgwyngyll • Llanfihangel Din Sylwy • Llangoed • Llaniestyn • Llansadwrn • Penmon • Penmynydd

^{1}a chapelry to Llantrisant in Lyfon hundred

The Local Government (Wales) Act 1994 abolished the 1974 county and the five districts on 1 April 1996, and Anglesey became a separate unitary authority. In 2011, the Welsh Government appointed a panel of commissioners to administer the council, which meant the elected members were not in control. The commissioners remained until an election was held in May 2013, restoring an elected Council. Before the period of direct administration, there had been a majority of independent councillors. Though members did not generally divide along party lines, these were organised into five non-partisan groups on the council, containing a mix of party and independent candidates. The position has been similar since the election, although the Labour Party has formed a governing coalition with the independents.

Brand new council offices were built at Llangefni in the 1990s for the new Isle of Anglesey County Council.

== Geography ==
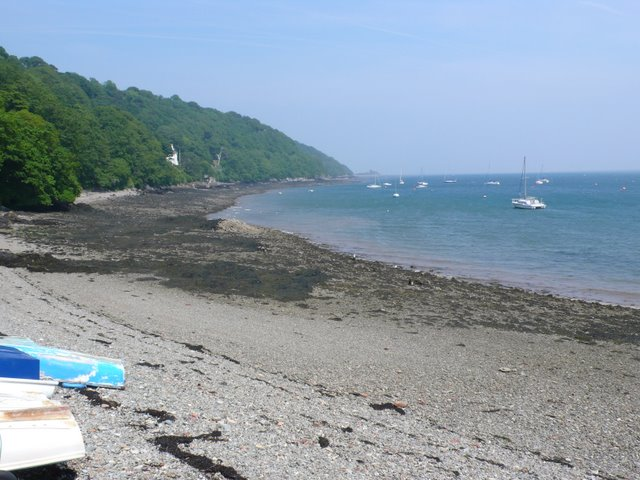
Anglesey coast

=== Physical ===
Anglesey is a low-lying island with low hills spaced evenly over the north. The highest six are Holyhead Mountain, 220 metres (720 ft); Mynydd Bodafon, 178 metres (584 ft); Mynydd Eilian, 177 metres (581 ft); Mynydd y Garn, 170 metres (560 ft); Bwrdd Arthur, 164 metres (538 ft); and Mynydd Llwydiarth, 158 metres (518 ft). To the south and south-east, the island is divided from the Welsh mainland by the Menai Strait, which at its narrowest point is about 250 metres (270 yd) wide. In all other directions the island is surrounded by the Irish Sea. At 676 km^{2} (261 sq mi), it is the 52nd largest island of Europe and just five km^{2} (1.9 sq mi) smaller than the main island of Singapore.

There are a few natural lakes, mostly in the west, such as Llyn Llywenan, the largest on the island, Llyn Coron, and Cors Cerrig y Daran, but rivers are few and small. There are two large water supply reservoirs operated by Welsh Water. These are Llyn Alaw to the north of the island and Llyn Cefni in the centre of the island, which is fed by the headwaters of the Afon Cefni.

The climate is humid (though less so than neighbouring mountainous Gwynedd) and generally equable thanks to the Gulf Stream. The land is of variable quality and has probably lost some fertility. Anglesey has the northernmost olive grove in Europe and presumably in the world.

=== Human ===
The coast of the Isle of Anglesey is more populous than the interior. The largest community is Holyhead, which is located on Holy Island and had a population of 12,103 at the 2021 United Kingdom census. It is followed by Amlwch (3,697), Llanfair-Mathafarn-Eithaf (3,085), and Menai Bridge (3,046), all located on the coast of the island of Anglesey. The largest community in the interior of Anglesey is Llangefni (5,500), the county town; the next-largest is Llanfihangel Ysgeifiog (1,711).

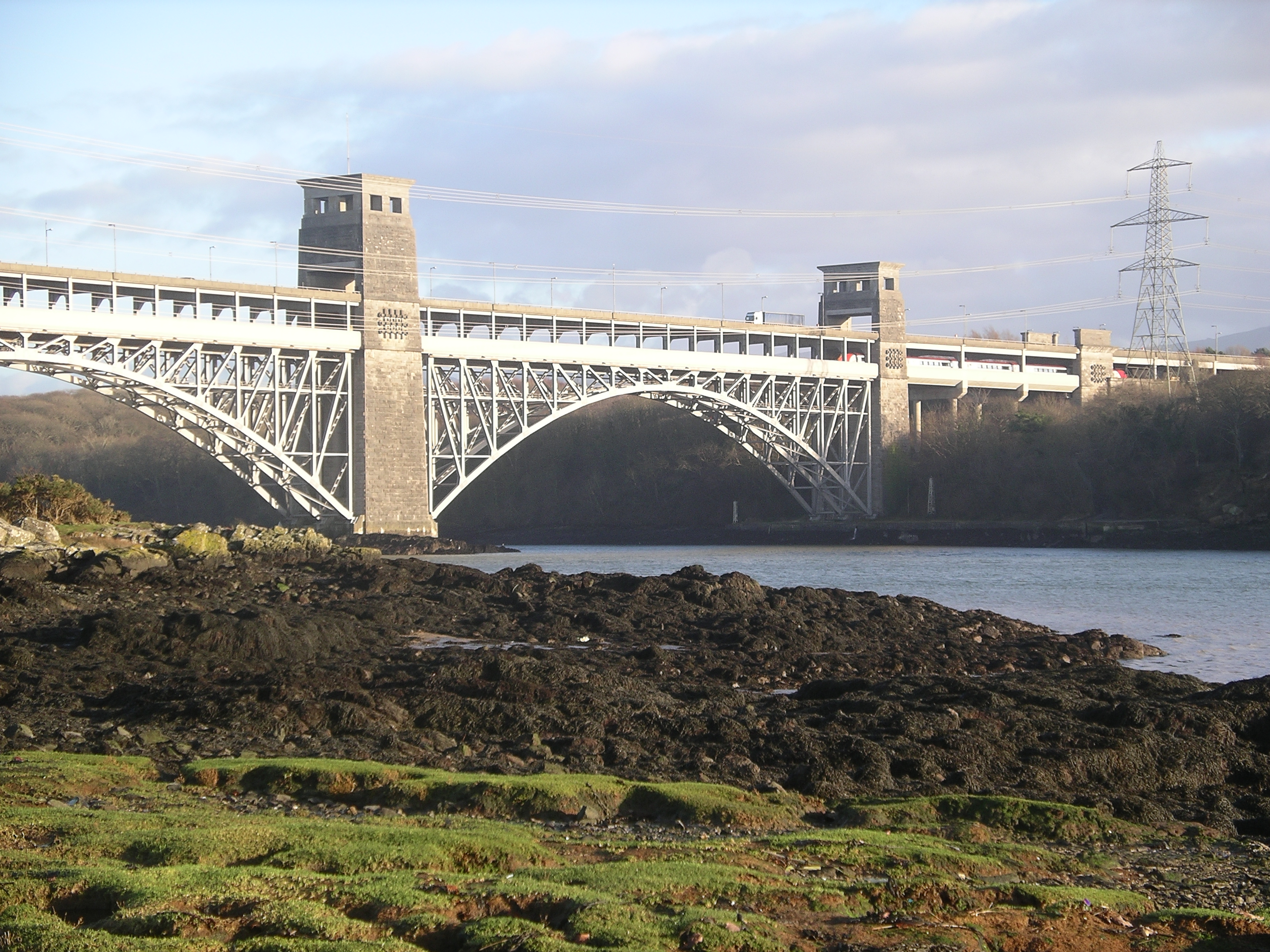
Britannia Bridge from the east along the Menai Strait

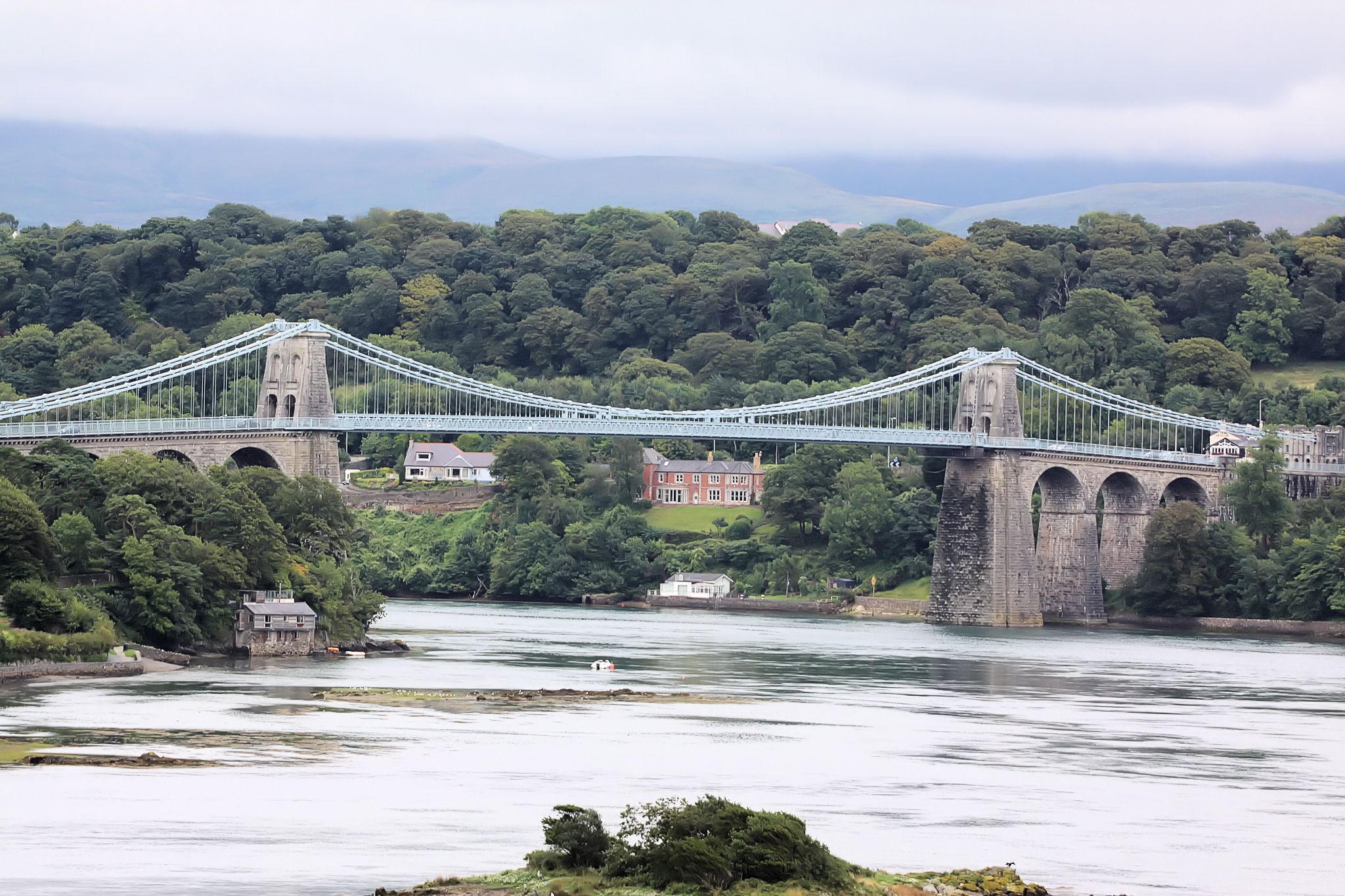
Menai Bridge

Beaumaris (Welsh: Biwmares) in the east features Beaumaris Castle, built by Edward I during his Bastide campaign in North Wales. Beaumaris is a yachting centre, with boats moored in the bay or off Gallows Point. The village of Newborough (Welsh: Niwbwrch), in the south, created when townsfolk of Llanfaes were relocated for the building of Beaumaris Castle, includes the site of Llys Rhosyr, another court of medieval Welsh princes featuring one of the United Kingdom's oldest courtrooms. The centrally located Llangefni is the island's administrative centre. The town of Menai Bridge (Welsh: Porthaethwy) in the south-east, expanded to accommodate workers and construction when the first bridge to the mainland was being built. Hitherto Porthaethwy had been one of the main ferry ports for the mainland. A short distance from the town lies Bryn Celli Ddu, a Stone Age burial mound.

Nearby is the village with the longest name in Europe, Llanfairpwllgwyngyllgogerychwyrndrobwllllantysiliogogogoch, and Plas Newydd, ancestral home of the Marquesses of Anglesey. The town of Amlwch lies in the north-east of the island and was once largely industrialised, having grown in the 18th century to support a major copper-mining industry at Parys Mountain.

Other settlements include Cemaes, Pentraeth, Gaerwen, Dwyran, Bodedern, Malltraeth and Rhosneigr.

== Coastal path ==
The coastline is classed as an Area of Outstanding Natural Beauty, with many sandy beaches, notably along its east coast between Beaumaris and Amlwch and west coast from Ynys Llanddwyn through Rhosneigr to the bays around Carmel Head. The north coast has sharp cliffs with small bays. Anglesey Coastal Path outlining the island is 124 miles (200 km) long and touches 20 towns and villages. The starting point is St Cybi's Church, Holyhead.

== Economy ==
Tourism is now the major economic activity. Agriculture comes second, with local dairies being some of the most productive in the region.

Major industry is restricted to Holyhead (Caergybi), which until 30 September 2009 supported an aluminium smelter, and the Amlwch area, once a copper mining town. Nearby stood Wylfa Nuclear Power Station and a former bromine extraction plant. With construction starting in 1963, the two Wylfa reactors began producing power in 1971. One reactor was decommissioned in 2012, the other in 2015.

Anglesey has three wind farms on land. There were plans to install tidal-flow turbines near The Skerries off the north coast, and for a major biomass plant on Holy Island (Ynys Gybi). Developing such low-carbon-energy assets to their full potential forms part of the Anglesey Energy Island project.

When the aluminium smelter closed in September 2009, it cut its workforce from 450 to 80, in a major blow to the island's economy, especially to Holyhead. The Royal Air Force station RAF Valley (Y Fali) holds the RAF Fast Jet Training School and 22 Sqn Search and Rescue Helicopters, both units providing employment to about 500 civilians. RAF Valley is now the 22 Sqn Search and Rescue headquarters.

The range of smaller industries is mostly in industrial and business parks such as Llangefni and Gaerwen. The island is on one of the main road routes from Britain to Ireland, via ferries from Holyhead on Holy Island to Dún Laoghaire and Dublin Port.

The Anglesey Sea Zoo is a local attraction offering looks at local marine wildlife from common lobsters to congers. All fish and crustaceans on display are caught round the island and placed in habitat reconstructions. The zoo also breeds lobsters commercially for food and oysters for pearls, both from local stocks. Sea salt (Halen Môn, from local sea water) is produced in a facility nearby, having formerly been made at the Sea Zoo site.

=== Abandoned nuclear plan ===
Plans were offered in 2013 by Horizon, a subsidiary of Hitachi, to start production in the 2020s. Though enthusiastically endorsed by Anglesey Council and Welsh Assembly members, protesters raised doubts about its economic and safety claims, and in January 2019 Hitachi announced it was putting development on hold.

On 17 January 2019, Hitachi-Horizon Nuclear Power announced it was abandoning plans to build a nuclear plant on the Wylfa Newydd site in Anglesey. There had been concern that the start might have involved too much public expenditure, but Hitachi-Horizon say the decision to scrap has cost the company over £2 billion.

== Ecology and conservation ==
Much of Anglesey is used for relatively intensive cattle and sheep farming, but several important wetland sites have protected status and the lakes all have significant ecological interest, including a wide range of aquatic and semi-aquatic bird species. In the west, the Malltraeth Marshes are believed to support an occasional visiting bittern, and the nearby estuary of the Afon Cefni has a bird population made famous internationally by the paintings of Charles Tunnicliffe, who lived and died at Malltraeth on the Cefni estuary. The RAF airstrip at Mona is a nesting site for skylarks. The sheer cliff faces at South Stack near Holyhead provide nesting sites for large numbers of auks, including puffins, razorbills and guillemots, along with choughs and peregrine falcons. Anglesey holds several tern species, including the roseate tern on three breeding sites – see Anglesey tern colonies.

There are marked occurrences of the Juncus subnodulosus–Cirsium palustre fen-meadow plant association marked by hydrophilic grasses, sedges and forbs.

Anglesey supports two of the UK's remnant colonies of red squirrels, at Pentraeth and Newborough.

Almost the whole coastline of Anglesey is designated as an Area of Outstanding Natural Beauty (AONB) to protect the aesthetic appeal and variety of the island's coastal landscape and habitats from inappropriate development. The coastal zone of Anglesey was classed as an AONB in 1966 and confirmed as such in 1967. The AONB is predominantly coastal, covering most of Anglesey's 125 miles (201 km) coastline, but includes Holyhead Mountain and Mynydd Bodafon. Large areas of other land protected by the AONB form the backdrop to the coast. The AONB is about 221 sq. m (85 sq mi) and is the largest in Wales, covering a third of the island.

A number of Anglesey habitats gain still greater protection through UK and European designations of their nature conservation value. These include:

- 6 candidate Special Areas of Conservation (cSACs)
- 4 Special Protection Areas (SPAs)
- 1 National Nature Reserve
- 26 Sites of Special Scientific Interest (SSSI)
- 52 Scheduled Ancient Monuments (SAMs)

These support a variety of wildlife, such as harbour porpoises and marsh fritillary.

The AONB takes in three sections of open, undeveloped coastline designated as Heritage Coast. These non-statutory designations complement the AONB and cover about 31 miles (50 km) of the coastline. The sections are:

1. North Anglesey 28.6 km (17.8 mi)
2. Holyhead Mountain 12.9 km (8.0 mi)
3. Aberffraw Bay 7.7 km (4.8 mi)

Popular recreations include sailing, angling, cycling, walking, wind surfing and jet skiing. They place pressures and demands on the AONB, while stoking the local economy.

== Culture ==
Anglesey hosted the National Eisteddfod in 1957, 1983, 1999, and 2017.

It belongs to the International Island Games Association. Anglesey's biggest successes were at the 1997 Island Games in Jersey, (11th in the medals table, with two gold, three silver and nine bronze medals) and the 2005 Island Games in the Shetland Islands, (again 11th, with 4 gold, 2 silver and 2 bronze).

The annual Anglesey Show is held on the second Tuesday and Wednesday of August. Farmers from around the country compete in livestock–rearing contests, including sheep and cattle. Other events include Gottwood, an electronic music and arts festival held each summer at the Carreglwyd estate.

Môn FM, a volunteer community radio station, broadcasts across the island from the county town, Llangefni, and also covers northern Gwynedd. Capital Anglesey & Gwynedd, a commercial contemporary hit radio station, broadcasts local news bulletins.

In 2017 filming took place for the Netflix TV series Free Rein. Scenes were used in all three series. Locations included Newborough Warren and Beaumaris Pier. In 2018, the BBC began a three-part series entitled Anglesey: Island Lives, detailing the lives of several residents of the island. In the first episode, Kris Hughes, a noted companion of the Druid community and the Anglesey Druid Order, was followed as the order marked the Summer Solstice.

== Welsh language ==
Anglesey is a stronghold of the Welsh language. According to the 2011 census it was the local authority with the second highest proportion of Welsh speakers. The earlier percentages were these:

- 1901: 91%
- 1911: 89%
- 1921: 88%
- 1931: 87%
- 1951: 80%
- 1961: 75%
- 1971: 66%
- 1981: 61%
- 1991: 62%
- 2001: 60%
- 2011: 57%
- 2021: 55%

Today, Welsh is less widely used, but remains the dominant language in some areas, particularly in the centre, including Llangefni and some parts of the south coast. The island's five secondary schools vary widely in the proportions of their pupils from predominantly Welsh-speaking homes, and in those who can speak Welsh:

- Ysgol David Hughes (in Menai Bridge): 33% come from Welsh-speaking homes; 90% "can speak Welsh."
- Ysgol Gyfun Llangefni (in Llangefni): 68% of pupils speak Welsh as their first language; 87% of pupils take their exams through the medium of Welsh.
- Ysgol Syr Thomas Jones (in Amlwch): 34% of pupils come from Welsh-speaking homes; 82% sit the Welsh First Language General Certificate of Secondary Education (GCSE).
- Ysgol Uwchradd Bodedern (in Bodedern): 67% of pupils come from Welsh-speaking homes; "a majority" speak Welsh fluently.
- Ysgol Uwchradd Caergybi (in Holyhead): 14% of pupils speak Welsh at home; 11% are taught the "Welsh First Language" curriculum.

== Geology ==
The geology of Anglesey is complex and frequently targeted for geology field trips by schools and colleges. Younger strata in Anglesey rest upon a foundation of old Precambrian rocks that appear at the surface in four areas:

1. a western region including Holyhead and Llanfaethlu
2. a central area about Aberffraw and Trefdraeth
3. an eastern region which includes Newborough, Gaerwen and Pentraeth
4. a coastal region at Glyn Garth between Menai Bridge and Beaumaris

These rocks are schists and phyllites, often contorted and disturbed. The general line of strike of the formations in the island is from north-east to south-west. A belt of granitic rocks lies just north-west of the central Precambrian mass, reaching from Llanfaelog near the coast to the vicinity of Llanerchymedd. Between this granite and the Precambrian of Holyhead is a narrow tract of Ordovician slates and grits with Llandovery beds in places, spreading out in the north of the island between Dulas Bay and Carmel Point. A small patch of Ordovician strata lies on the northern side of Beaumaris. In parts, these Ordovician rocks are much folded, crushed and metamorphosed, and associated with schists and altered volcanic rocks which are probably Precambrian. Between the eastern and central Precambrian masses Carboniferous rocks are found. Carboniferous Limestone occupies a broad area south of Lligwy Bay and Pentraeth, and sends a narrow spur in south-westwards by Llangefni to Malltraeth Sands. It is underlain on the north-west by a red basement conglomerate and yellow sandstone (sometimes considered of Old Red Sandstone age). Limestone occurs again on the north coast around Llanfihangel and Llangoed; and in the south-west round Llanidan near the Menai Strait. Puffin Island is made of Carboniferous Limestone. Malltraeth Marsh is occupied by Coal Measures, and a small patch of the same formation appears near Tal-y-foel Ferry on the Menai Strait. A patch of rhyolitic/felsitic rocks forms Parys Mountain, where copper and iron ochre have been worked. Serpentine (Mona Marble) is found near Llanfair-yn-Neubwll and upon the opposite shore in Holyhead. Anglesey is the only onshore part of the UK to have sediments dated to the Early Middle Miocene (?Langhian).

Under the name GeoMôn, affirming its extraordinary geological heritage, the island gained membership of the European Geoparks Network in spring 2009. and the Global Geoparks Network in September 2010. It has also been designated as a UNESCO Global Geopark since 2015.

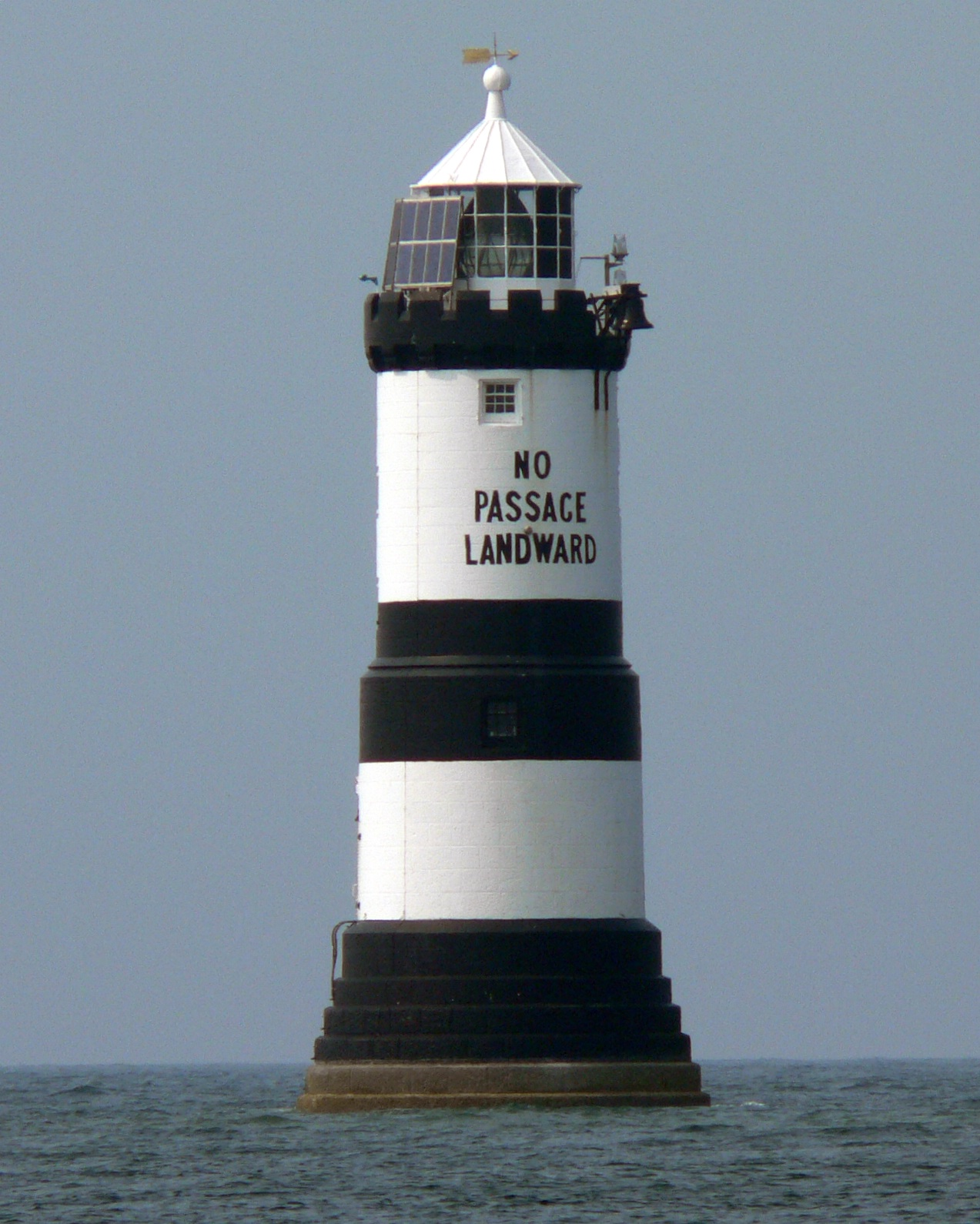
Trwyn Du Lighthouse

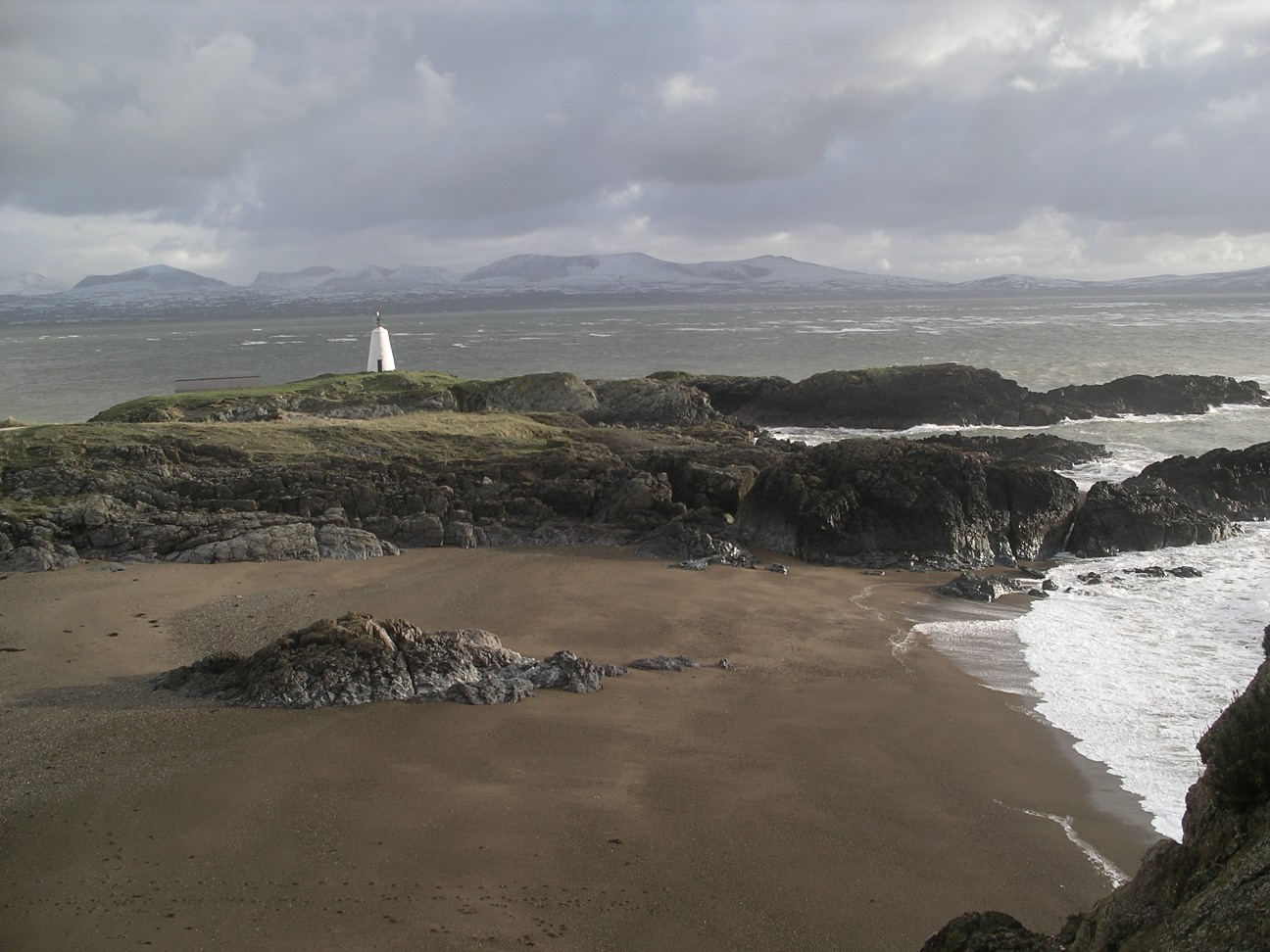
Ynys Llanddwyn, old lighthouse with Snowdonia in background

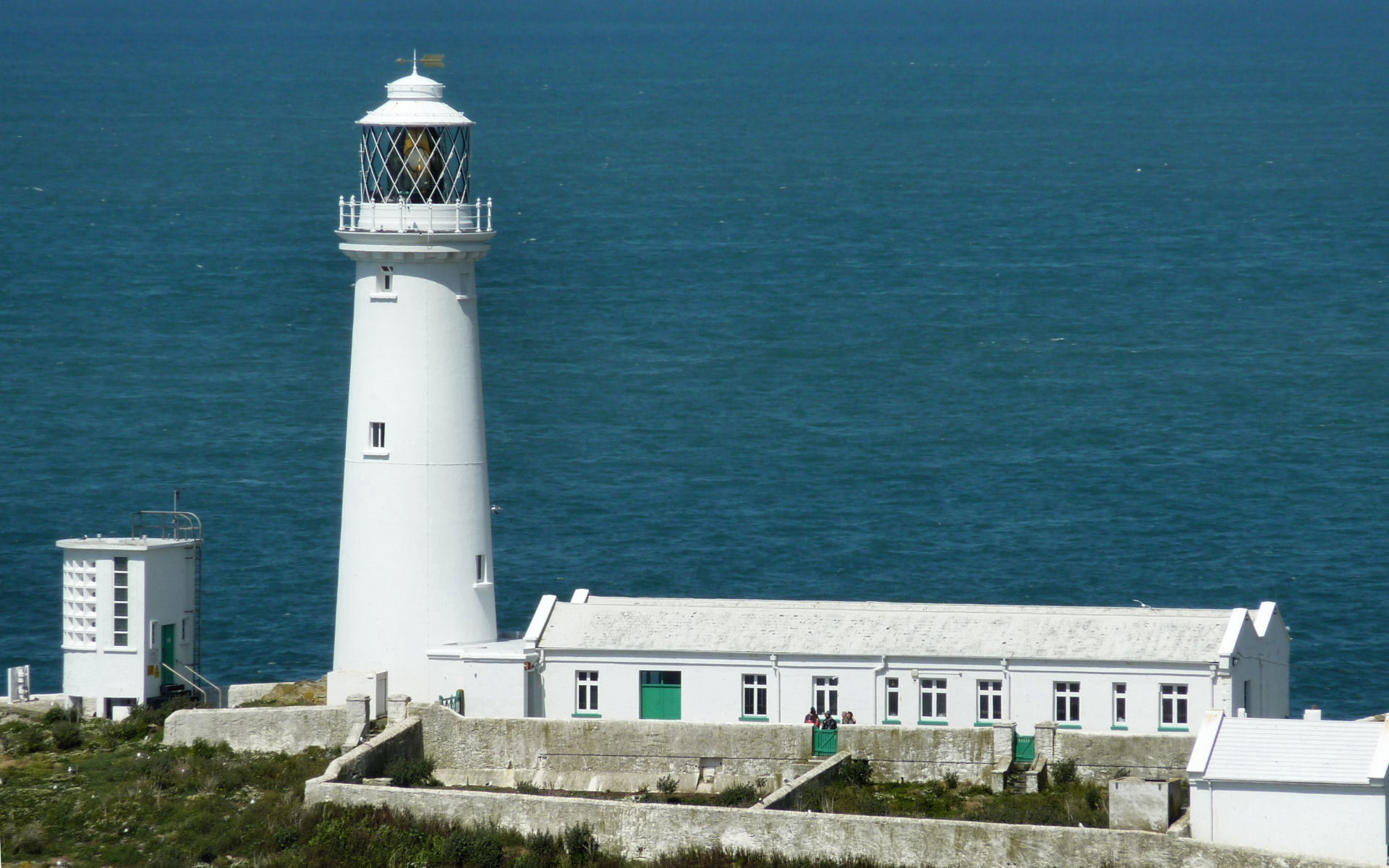
South Stack Lighthouse

== Landmarks ==
- Anglesey Motor Racing Circuit
- Anglesey Sea Zoo near Dwyran
- Bays and beaches – Benllech, Cemlyn, Red Wharf, and Rhosneigr
- Beaumaris Castle and Gaol
- Cribinau – tidal island with 13th-century church
- Elin's Tower (Twr Elin) – RSPB reserve and the lighthouse at South Stack (Ynys Lawd) near Holyhead
- King Arthur's seat – near Beaumaris
- Llanfairpwllgwyngyll, one of the longest place names in the world
- Malltraeth – centre for bird life and home of wildlife artist Charles Tunnicliffe
- Moelfre – fishing village
- Parys Mountain – copper mine dating to the early Bronze Age
- Penmon – priory and dovecote
- Skerries Lighthouse – at the end of a low piece of submerged land, north-east of Holyhead
- St Cybi's Church – historic church in Holyhead
- Stone Science Museum – privately run fossil museum near Pentraeth
- Swtan longhouse and museum – owned by the National Trust and managed by the local community
- Working windmill – Llanddeusant
- Ynys Llanddwyn (Llanddwyn Island) – tidal island

== Notable people ==
=== Born in Anglesey ===
- Tony Adams – actor (Anglesey, 1940)
- Stu Allan – radio and club DJ
- Billy Butler - radio personality (Amlwch, 1942)
- John C. Clarke – U.S. state politician (Anglesey, 1831)
- Grace Coddington – creative director for US Vogue (Anglesey, 1941)
- Charles Allen Duval – artist and writer (Beaumaris, 1810)
- Dawn French – actress, writer, comedian (Holyhead, 1957)
- Huw Garmon – actor (Anglesey, 1966)
- Hugh Griffith – Oscar-winning actor (Marianglas, 1912)
- Elen Gwdman – poet (fl. 1609)
- Meinir Gwilym – singer and songwriter (Llangristiolus, 1983)
- Owain Gwynedd – royal prince (Anglesey, c. 1100)
- Hywel Gwynfryn – radio and TV personality (Llangefni, 1942)
- Max Horton - British submariner during the First World War and commander-in-chief of the Western Approaches in the later half of the Second World War, responsible for British participation in the Battle of the Atlantic (Rhosneigr, 1883)
- Aled Jones – singer and television presenter (Llandegfan, 1970)
- John Jones – amateur astronomer (Bryngwyn Bach, Dwyran 1818 – Bangor 1898); a.k.a. Ioan Bryngwyn Bach and Y Seryddwr
- William Jones – mathematician (Llanfihangel Tre'r Beirdd, 1675)
- Julian Lewis Jones – actor, known for his portrayal of Karl Morris on the Sky 1 comedy Stella (Anglesey, 1968)
- John Morris-Jones – grammarian and poet (Llandrygarn, 1864)
- Edward Owen – 18th-century artist, notable for letters documenting life in London's art scene
- Goronwy Owen – 18th-century poet (Llanfair-Mathafarn-Eithaf, 1723)
- Osian Roberts – association football player and manager (Bodffordd)
- Tecwyn Roberts – NASA aerospace engineer and Director of Networks at Goddard Space Flight Center (Llanddaniel Fab, 1925)
- Hugh Owen Thomas – pioneering orthopaedic surgeon (Anglesey, 1836)
- Ifor Owen Thomas – operatic tenor, photographer and artist (Red Wharf Bay, 1892)
- Sefnyn – medieval court poet
- Owen Tudor – grandfather of Henry Tudor, married the widow of Henry V, which gave the Tudor family a claim on the English throne (Anglesey, c. 1400).
- Kyffin Williams – landscape painter (Llangefni, 1918)
- William Williams – recipient of the Victoria Cross (Amlwch, 1890)
- Andy Whitfield – actor (Amlwch, 1971)
- Gareth Williams – employee of Britain's GCHQ signals intelligence agency (Valley, 1978)

=== Lived in Anglesey ===
- Rachel Davies (Rahel o Fôn) – preacher
- Henry Austin Dobson – poet and essayist (Plymouth, Devon 1840)
- Taron Egerton – actor and star of Rocketman (raised on Anglesey from age 3 to age 12)
- Ren Gill – musician, known as Ren, (born Bangor, 1990; raised in Dwyran)
- Gareth Glyn – composer and broadcaster (since 1978)
- Wayne Hennessey – footballer, goalkeeper for the Wales national football team (Bangor, 1987)
- Ian "Lemmy" Kilmister – heavy metal bass player and singer, front man of Motörhead (Stoke-on-Trent, 1945)
- Glenys Kinnock – politician (Holyhead, 1950s)
- Marquesses of Anglesey – noble family from Plas Newydd, Llanfairpwll
- Matthew Maynard – cricketer (Oldham, Lancashire 1966)
- George North – Wales rugby union international (born King's Lynn, 1992; family moved to Anglesey in his early childhood)
- Cara Hope – Wales rugby union international player (born Bangor, 1993; raised in Llangaffo)
- Gruff Rhys – musician best known for being the leadman of Super Furry Animals grew up in Rachub, near Bethesda (Haverfordwest, 18 July 1970)
- Iain Duncan Smith – leader of the Conservative Party 2001–2003, attended HMS Conway School Ship Plas Newydd, Llanfairpwll, 1968–1972.
- Charles Tunnicliffe – wildlife artist (Langley, Macclesfield, 1901)
- Naomi Watts – Oscar-nominated actress (born Kent, 1968)
- Rex Whistler – artist (born Eltham, Kent 1905)
- Maurice Wilks – father of the Land Rover, which was test driven on Newborough and Llanddona beach
- William, Prince of Wales and his wife Catherine, Princess of Wales. (2010–2013)
- Clive Woodward – rugby union player and England / British Lions coach, attended HMS Conway School Ship Plas Newydd, Llanfairpwll, 1969–1974.

== Schools ==
Secondary schools:

- Ysgol David Hughes, Menai Bridge
- Ysgol Gyfun Llangefni, Llangefni
- Ysgol Syr Thomas Jones, Amlwch
- Ysgol Uwchradd Bodedern, Bodedern
- Ysgol Uwchradd Caergybi, Holyhead

There are 50 primary, all co-educational day schools.

== Transport ==
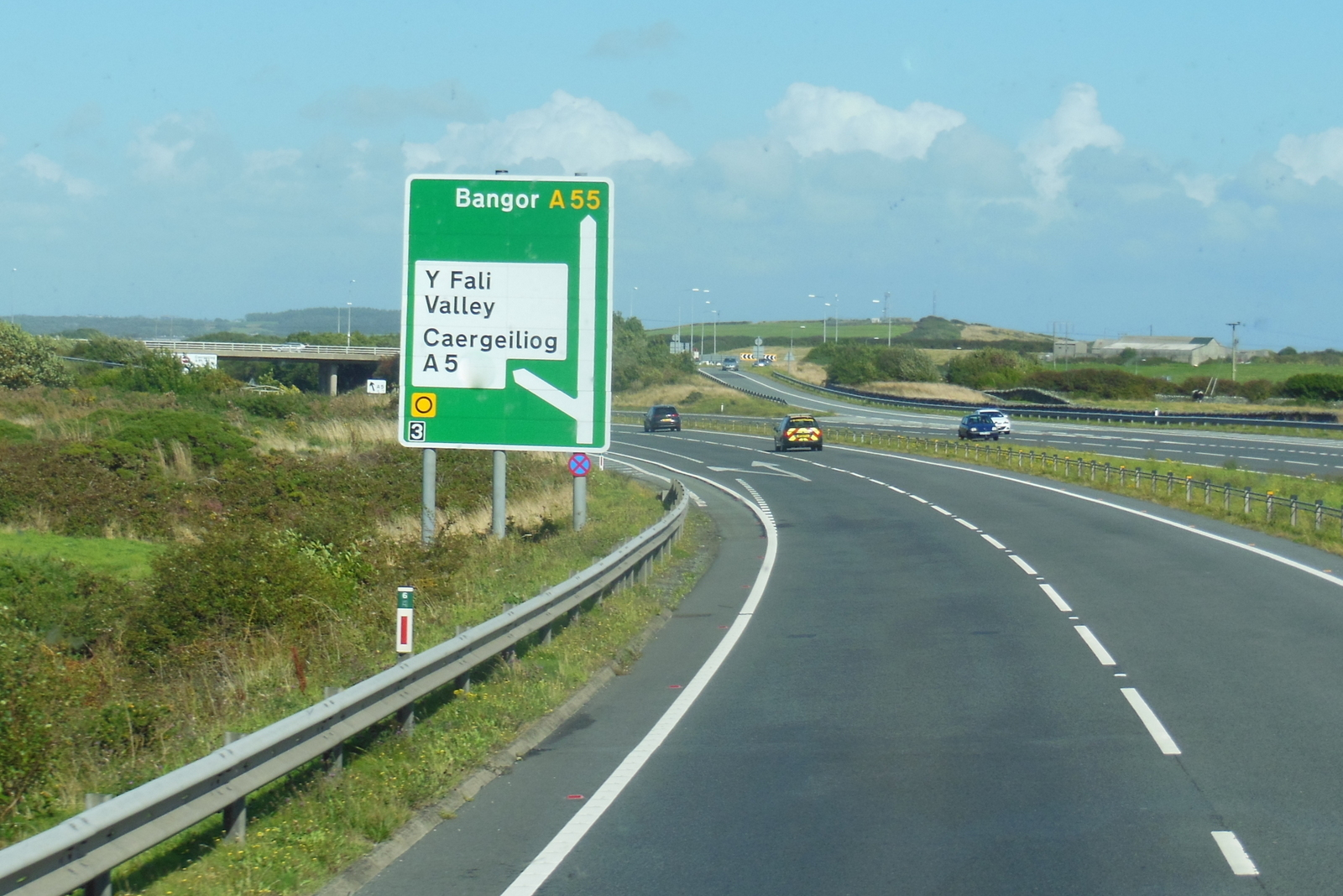
The A55 North Wales Expressway on Anglesey

Anglesey is linked to the mainland by the Britannia Bridge, carrying the A55 from Holyhead, and the Menai Suspension Bridge, carrying the A5 trunk road. The A5025 round the northern edge of Anglesey and the A4080 round the southern edge form a ring.

The North Wales Coast Line travels across the Britannia Bridge to Anglesey. The six railway stations on the island are Holyhead, Valley, Rhosneigr, Ty Croes, Bodorgan and Llanfairpwll. Services operated by Avanti West Coast to London Euston, and by Transport for Wales Rail to Chester, Manchester Piccadilly, Birmingham New Street and Cardiff Central. Historically the island was also served by the Anglesey Central Railway which ran from Gaerwen to Amlwch, and the Red Wharf Bay branch line between Holland Arms railway station and Red Wharf Bay.

Anglesey Airport, until 2020, had a twice-daily scheduled service to Cardiff Airport. The route was subsidised by the Welsh government and suspended due to the COVID-19 pandemic. After a 2022 review, the Welsh government announced that it would not reinstate the flights; travel between Cardiff and Anglesey now takes over four hours by road or rail.

The ferry port of Holyhead handles over two million passengers a year. Stena Line and Irish Ferries sail to Dublin (previously to Dún Laoghaire), forming the main surface transport link from central and northern England and Wales to Ireland.

== Sport and leisure ==
Anglesey is independently represented in the Island Games (as Ynys Môn). The team finished joint 17th in the 2009 Games hosted by Åland, winning medals in gymnastics, sailing, and shooting.

Anglesey made an unsuccessful bid for the 2009 games, led by Ynys Môn MP Albert Owen, in the hope of more than £3m of spending if it had hosted the event. However, Anglesey lacks two needful facilities: a six-lane competition swimming pool and an athletics track.

Several precursors to the modern football codes were popular in Anglesey. They had few rules and were quite violent. Rhys Cox at the turn of the 18th century described a game in Llandrygan ending with "numbers of players... left here and there on the road, some having limbs broken in the struggle, others severely injured, and some carried on biers to be buried in the churchyard nearest to where they had been mortally injured." William Bulkeley, in his April 1734 diary, records that the violence of such games left no hard feelings, with both sides parting "as good friends as they came, after they had spent half an hour together cherishing their spirits with a cup of ale... having finished Easter Holydays innocently and merrily."

=== Football ===
This arrived in the 1870s and met with local resistance for its perceived associations with drunkenness and rowdiness and the lower classes. One critic called it an "un-Christian practice". An Anglesey League of teams from Amlwch, Beaumaris, Holyhead, Menai Bridge, Llandegfan, and Llangefni was formed in the 1895–96 season. This gave way in 2020 to the North Wales Coast West Football League.

The Ynys Môn football team represents Anglesey at the biannual Island Games, winning gold in 1999. In 2018, the island was chosen to host the 2019 Inter Games Football Tournament, where the men's team won gold and the women's team won silver.

For the aborted 2020–21 season, Llangefni Town and Holyhead Hotspur were due to play in the Cymru North league, the second tier of the Welsh football league system, after winning the Welsh Alliance League two years before. There were due to be nine Anglesey sides in the same season's fourth tier North Wales Coast West Football League Premier Division: Aberffraw, Amlwch Town, Bodedern Athletic, Bro Goronwy, Gaerwen, Gwalchmai, Menai Bridge Tigers, Pentraeth and Trearddur Bay Bulls. There are a further nine teams in Division One.

=== Rugby Union ===
Llangefni RFC is the island's highest competing team in the WRU Division One North. Llangoed hosts an annual rugby sevens contest. Touring sides have included Manhattan RFC.

=== Anglesey Hunt ===
Anglesey Hunt, formed in 1757, was the second oldest fox hunting association in Wales after Tivyside Hunt in Cardiganshire.

=== Athletics ===
Every September the Anglesey Festival of Running includes a marathon, a half-marathon, 10-km and 5-km races, and children's contests. Its slogan is Run the Island. There are at present no 400-metre, all-weather, synthetic tracks on the island, the nearest being between Bangor and the Britannia Bridge on the mainland.

=== Motorsport ===
The Anglesey Circuit (Welsh: Trac Môn) is a licensed MSA and ACU championship racing circuit that opened in 1997. It hosts many events all year round and is a popular track.

=== Cricket ===
The Beaumaris Cricket Club formed in 1858. Clubs at Holyhead, Amlwch and Llangefni formed in the following decade, but not until the 1880s was the sport popular outside the upper classes. Bodedern Cricket Club was formed in 1947.

=== Sailing ===
The Royal Anglesey Yacht Club hosts the annual Menai Strait Regatta.

=== Swimming ===
The Menai Strait hosts two annual open-water contests: the Menai Strait Swim from Foel to Caernarfon (1 mile), and the Pier to Pier Open Water Swim, between Beaumaris and Garth Pier, Bangor. There is a 25-metre pool at Plas Arthur Leisure Centre in Llangefni.

== See also ==
- Prehistoric Wales
- Roman conquest of Anglesey
- List of scheduled monuments in Anglesey
- List of places in Anglesey
- List of Anglesey towns by population
- List of lord lieutenants of Anglesey
- List of custos rotulorums of Anglesey
- List of sheriffs of Anglesey
- Isle of Anglesey County Council
- Ynys Môn (UK Parliament constituency)
- Ynys Môn (Assembly constituency)
- List of islands of Wales – including those around Anglesey
- The Royal Navy's four ships named HMS Anglesea
- Anglesey Antiquarian Society
