= Anglesey Central Railway =

Disused railway line in Wales

Coordinates: 53.4095°N 4.3486°W

Overview
- Locale: Wales
- Continues as: London and North Western Railway

History
- Opened: 16 December 1864

Technical
- Line length: 17 3/4 miles (28.6 km)
- Track gauge: 4 ft 8 1/2 in (1,435 mm) standard gauge

The Anglesey Central Railway (Welsh: Lein Amlwch, Amlwch Line) was a 17.5-mile (28.2 km) standard-gauge railway in Anglesey, Wales, connecting the port of Amlwch and the county town of Llangefni with the North Wales Coast Line at Gaerwen. Built as an independent railway, the railway opened in portions from 1864 to 1867. Due to financial troubles, the railway was sold to the London and North Western Railway in 1876, which invested significantly in the infrastructure. Operation continued under various companies during the 20th century, but passenger services were withdrawn in 1964 as part of the Beeching Axe. Industrial freight services continued until 1993. The railway's tracks remain and local groups have demonstrated an interest in restoring services as a heritage railway.

The sustainable transport charity Sustrans (Now Walk Wheel Cycle Trust) has proposed to use the route as a cycle path (rail trail). The Welsh Assembly Government, in partnership with Network Rail, commissioned a feasibility study into the reopening of the line, which started in early 2011.

== Route ==
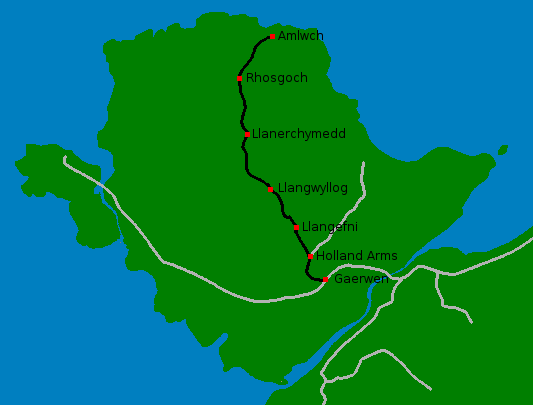
The principal route of the Anglesey Central Railway, and other nearby lines

The railway branches off westbound from the North Wales Coast Line at Gaerwen, and turns northeast to descend into Malltraeth Marsh (Welsh: Cors Ddyga), passing below Thomas Telford's A5 and the A55 just before Holland Arms station at Pentre Berw. The Red Wharf Bay branch (now removed) left the line here, as the Amlwch line continues north-west, crossing the River Cefni and approaching Llangefni.

North of Llangefni, the railway follows the course of the River Cefni in The Dingle (Nant Y Pandy). Having followed the river through the narrow valley, over bridges and through cuttings, the railway crosses Llyn Cefni, the island's second-largest reservoir.

The railway continues north-west over easier terrain towards Llangwyllog and Llanerchymedd, where it turns north, running to the east of Llyn Alaw toward Rhosgoch. It then turns north-east around Parys Mountain before reaching Amlwch.

== History ==
=== Early days ===
The railways arrived on Anglesey with the construction of the Chester and Holyhead Railway, of which the section from Llanfairpwll to Holyhead opened in 1848, two years before the Britannia Bridge was finished. The Chester and Holyhead railway surveyed a branch to Llangefni in 1852, but chose not to proceed. George Stephenson notably reported that the line was not worth building.

The idea of a local railway was still of interest to the people of Anglesey. A public meeting was held in Llangefni on 5 July 1858, to popularise the idea of building a railway leaving the main line at Gaerwen, running north to Amlwch, west to Cemaes Bay, then south through Llanrhyddlad to rejoin the main line at Valley. This ambitious scheme did not gain enough support to proceed, although some landowners offered to exchange land for shares.

Proposals changed into a railway from Gaerwen to Amlwch, with another meeting in Llangefni, on 1 August 1861. David Davies and his partner Ezra Roberts offered to build the line at a cost of £6,000 per mile, complete except for rolling stock, or for £5,000 per mile, with the company to purchase the land and meet "preliminary and parliamentary expenses". This proposal won favour with the fledgling company, but it was not taken up. The London and North Western Railway (LNWR) (who had taken over the Chester and Holyhead Railway) were approached in 1862. The LNWR were not interested, so the railway was financed independently.

=== 1863–1876: Independent operation ===
Anglesey Central Railway Act 1863
- Act of Parliament
- Parliament of the United Kingdom
- Long title: An Act to authorize the Construction of a Railway in the County of Anglesey, to be called "The Anglesey Central Railway;" and for other Purposes.
- Citation: 26 & 27 Vict. c.cxxviii

Dates
- Royal assent: 13 July 1863

Text of statute as originally enacted

Anglesey Central Railway (Deviation) Act 1864
- Act of Parliament
- Parliament of the United Kingdom
- Long title: An Act to enable the Anglesey Central Railway Company to make a Deviation of a Portion of their authorized Line.
- Citation: 27 & 28 Vict. c. xxxiv

Dates
- Royal assent: 13 May 1864

The Anglesey Central Railway Act 1863 (26 & 27 Vict. c.cxxviii) founded the company, with capital of £120,000. The chairman was William Bulkeley Hughes, MP for Caernarfon and local railway prospector. The ceremonial first sod was cut on 11 September 1863, with construction starting the following year by the contractors Dickson and Russell. With the line approaching Llangefni later in October 1864, LNWR engineers were authorised to build the main line junction at Gaerwen, at the Anglesey Central Railway's expense.

The line opened for freight as far as Llangefni on 16 December 1864. A special train carried the directors and friends from Bangor to a temporary station in Llangefni in 37 minutes. A banquet was held at the Bull Hotel for 100 guests, with celebrations continuing that evening in Bangor. The line was surveyed by Captain Rich on behalf of the Board of Trade in February, and they approved the line for passenger traffic on 8 March 1865. Passenger services started four days later, with an engine and carriages loaned by the LNWR. In the six months to December 1865, the railway carried 18,839 passengers and 3,866 tons of freight (3,928 t), excluding livestock.

Anglesey Central Railway Act 1866
- Act of Parliament
- Parliament of the United Kingdom
- Long title: An Act to enable the Anglesey Central Railway Company to transfer their Undertaking; and for other Purposes.
- Citation: 29 & 30 Vict. c. cccxx

Dates
- Royal assent: 6 August 1866

Further construction of the line was limited by a lack of funds. Russell asked the LNWR to adopt the line in August 1865, to no avail. The Anglesey Central Railway Act 1866 (29 & 30 Vict. c. cccxx) gave permission to raise a further £20,000, with loans of £6,600. After raising this capital, the line was opened to Llanerchymedd in 1866, with the temporary station at Llangefni replaced by a permanent structure one-half mile (0.8 km) further on. Captain Rich, when surveying the line, noted that the curves and gradients were severe, and recommended that the line be worked at moderate speed. He also noted the lack of turntables, and the company's intention to use Fairlie engines on the line.

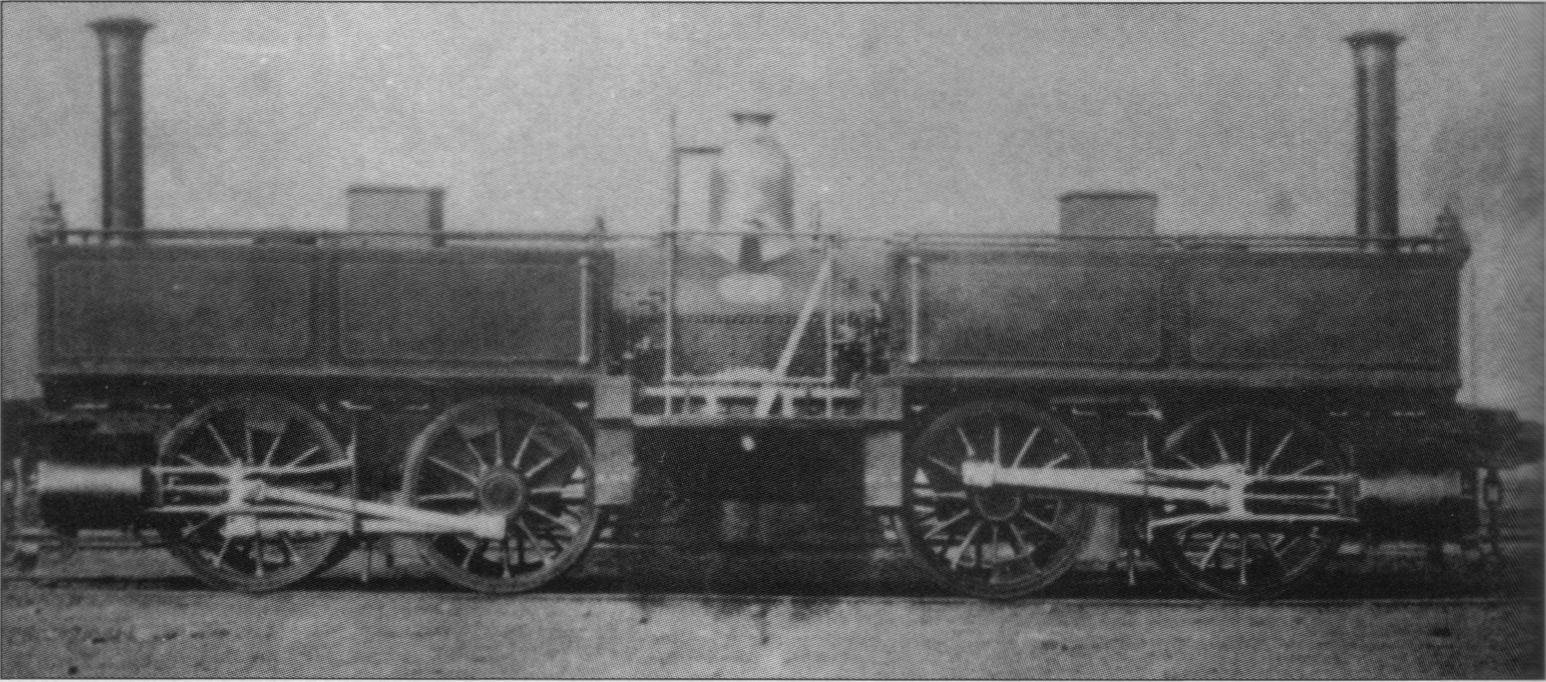
Mountaineer, a double Fairlie engine, was used in 1866, but was not a success.

The Anglesey Central Railway Act 1866 also gave the Anglesey Central Railway (ACR) the right to authorise Dickson to lease or work the line, or to lease or sell the line to the LNWR. Dickson did indeed undertake to operate services. He requested permission from the LNWR to run services through to Bangor, but they refused, and passengers had to continue to change at Gaerwen. The act authorised a branch from Rhosgoch to Cemaes, but this was not built. The Fairlie engine Mountaineer was in use on the line in April 1866, but by October 1867 it was in use on the Neath and Brecon Railway, of which Dickson was also the contractor and whose traffic he was working. The Neath and Brecon's 0-6-0 Miers also operated on the ACR, under the name Anglesea. Neither of those engines was considered successful.

==== The railway reaches Amlwch ====
The final section to Amlwch was surveyed by the now Major Rich in January 1867. After remedial work, it opened to passengers throughout on 3 June 1867, although the first freight train to Amlwch was on 10 September 1866, according to Amlwch's first stationmaster, Mr O. Dew.

The line had been built single-track throughout, with the only run-around loop provided at Amlwch, meaning that trains could not pass each other. To ensure safe working, the Staff and Ticket system was used in three sections: Gaerwen-Llangefni, Llangefni-Llanerchymedd, and Llanerchymedd-Amlwch, using A and B configured staffs alternately. No turntable was built, as the intended Fairlie engines would not require one. When the LNWR provided engines, they used tank engines where possible, rather than an engine with a tender.

Mona Mine, operating the copper works at Parys Mountain, switched from exporting ore by sea to by railway in 1865, two years before it reached Amlwch. Delivery prices per ton of ore were 25 shillings to London, 20 shillings to Birmingham, and 14 shillings and 2 pence to Liverpool, when carried from Gaerwen (by the LNWR). Carriage from Llangefni (then the terminus of the ACR) cost 2 shillings and sixpence more.

The mines soon became uneconomic to operate and closed in 1871. Livestock, artificial fertiliser, and farm produce made up the majority of the remaining freight traffic.

==== Financial troubles ====
Dickson, who was operating all services on the railway, failed financially in September 1867. William Dew, secretary of the company, writing in April of that year stated that "the affairs of the railway are in such a critical and pressing state". The ACR turned once again to the LNWR, asking them to work the line. These negotiations failed, but the LNWR did agree to lend an engine and carriages once again. T. L. Kettle suggested to the chairperson in 1870 that sale to the LNWR would be desirable, on account of the company's debts. The financial situation restricted the company's ambitions:

As regards the line to Port of Amlwch, nothing ought to be done till there is certainty by guarantee or otherwise of sufficient traffic to pay a proper interest on the capital to be expended in making it.

— Neville Story Maskelyne, writing to the chairman

On 16 December 1875, as a result of legal action by independent locomotive manufacturers, an injunction was issued restricting the LNWR "from manufacturing locomotive engines or other rolling stock for sale or hire on other than their own railway". In January 1876 the LNWR informed the ACR that they could no longer lend the engine in use, as a result of the recent court case. Three choices were suggested by the LNWR: that the line be bought outright, that a proper working arrangement be made, or that the ACR "might buy the engine and carriages now on the line". The ACR were not in a position to buy the stock, and made arrangements for the sale of the railway.

=== 1876–1923: London and North Western Railway ===
Anglesey Central Railway (Transfer) Act 1876
- Act of Parliament
- Parliament of the United Kingdom
- Long title: An Act to transfer the Undertaking of the Anglesey Central Railway Company to the London and North-western Railway Company; to provide for winding up the affairs of the Anglesea Central Railway Company; and for other purposes.
- Citation: 39 & 40 Vict. c. clxxii

Dates
- Royal assent: 24 July 1876

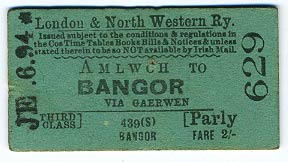
LNWR ticket for travel to Bangor, a nearby hub on the railway network

After a decade of operating as an independent company, the line was transferred to the London and North Western Railway in 1876, for £80,000. This was enacted by the (39 & 40 Vict. c. clxxii), and the LNWR assumed control of the line on 1 July 1876.

A survey conducted by the LNWR found that the bridges and culverts were in a fair condition, but the stations were dirty. Fences were decayed, rails needed replacing, some sleepers were rotten, and the ballast was soft and shaley. The LNWR addressed these problems over the coming years.

A short passing loop was built at Llangefni station in 1877 for engines to run round, but at only 40 yards (37 m) long it was not of much use for allowing passenger trains to pass each other. A refuge siding was built for freight trains at Llanerchymedd in 1878, along with an engine shed in Amlwch. In 1882, new station buildings replaced the basic wooden sheds at Holland Arms, Llangwyllog and Rhosgoch, as well as development of the junction at Gaerwen into a full double junction, and a second signal cabin was built there. An extended Amlwch station received a canopy by 1884. The staff and ticket system was supplemented with block working in 1886, and was replaced with the electric staff system in 1894.

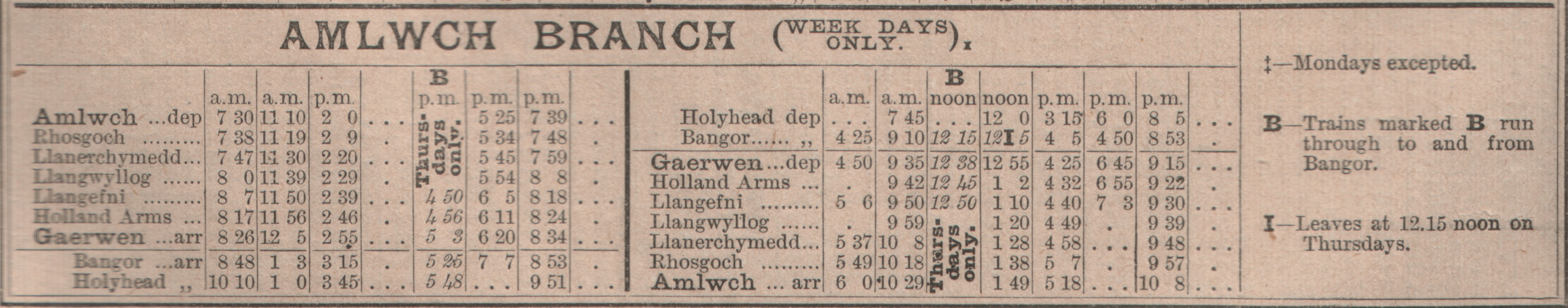
Passenger timetable, December 1896

The timetable for January 1883 shows a variety of passenger, goods and mixed trains, giving five passenger services down to Amlwch, and six up. The first train of the morning, departing Bangor at 04:20, and the 19:35 from Amlwch also carried mail to and from the island. The majority of trains still terminated at Gaerwen. As Llangefni held a livestock market on a Thursday, an extra service from Bangor to Llangefni on Thursdays was introduced by the 1896 timetable.

==== 1877 accident ====
In the early morning of 29 November 1877, heavy rain caused the dam of the Rhodgeidio mill near Llanerchymedd to breach, and the surge of water washed away the wooden Caemawr bridge over the Afon Alaw. The first train of the day was driven by William Taylor, with fireman John Saunders and railway inspector John Davies also on the footplate. The train also included two coal trucks, a passenger coach, and a guard's van, with Edward Hughes serving as the guard. The whole train went over the side of the bridge into the river. Edward Hughes dragged himself out and was taken to the nearest farm. John Davies was scalded to death, and Taylor and Saunders were found injured and could not be freed until midday. John Saunders later died from his injuries.

Robert Williams, one of the Anglesey Central Railway's first drivers, noted that he had been instructed to drive the morning train, but that he slept late, and William Taylor replaced him at short notice. The bridge was later rebuilt in stone, and is known to this day as Pont Damwain (Accident Bridge).

==== Red Wharf Bay branch ====
The LNWR obtained powers to build a branch from Holland Arms to Red Wharf Bay in 1899 and 1900. The line was opened to Pentraeth in 1908, and reached Red Wharf Bay in 1909. The Gaerwen-Llangefni staff section was replaced with Gaerwen-Holland Arms and Holland Arms-Llangefni sections, but the single line to Red Wharf Bay was operated as one section.

The autotrain introduced to serve this branch also operated on the Amlwch line: when not running to Red Wharf Bay the motor train would operate between Llangefni and Gaerwen while the main branch train was on the round trip from Llangefni to Amlwch and back.

==== Passing loop at Llangwyllog ====
The lack of a passing loop suitable for passenger trains on the Amlwch line meant that trains could only operate every two hours. Coordinating this limited timetable with the main line services through Gaerwen was difficult, and passengers could face a long wait on occasions. To make the branch line workings more flexible, a passing loop was proposed for Llangwyllog in March 1914. The work was completed for the summer timetables. This required introducing a new working section, and Llangwyllog became a staff station. As the new section was in the middle of a line, a third type of staff was required (a C configuration); one of only a few sections on the LNWR that did not use a type A or B staff.

In 1916, the passing loop was used by one pair of passenger trains in the evening, with an extra down train (toward Amlwch) making seven down and six up trains per day. The railmotor train's services had grown to 24 single trips between Gaerwen/Holland Arms and Llangefni/Red Wharf Bay. The continuing shortages of World War I meant that in January 1917 many passenger services were to be cut to give more resources to the war effort. The railways were slow to recover from the wartime hardships, and in 1921 there were six passenger trains to and from Amlwch, and only 18 single trips by the motor train.

=== 1923–1946: London, Midland and Scottish Railway ===
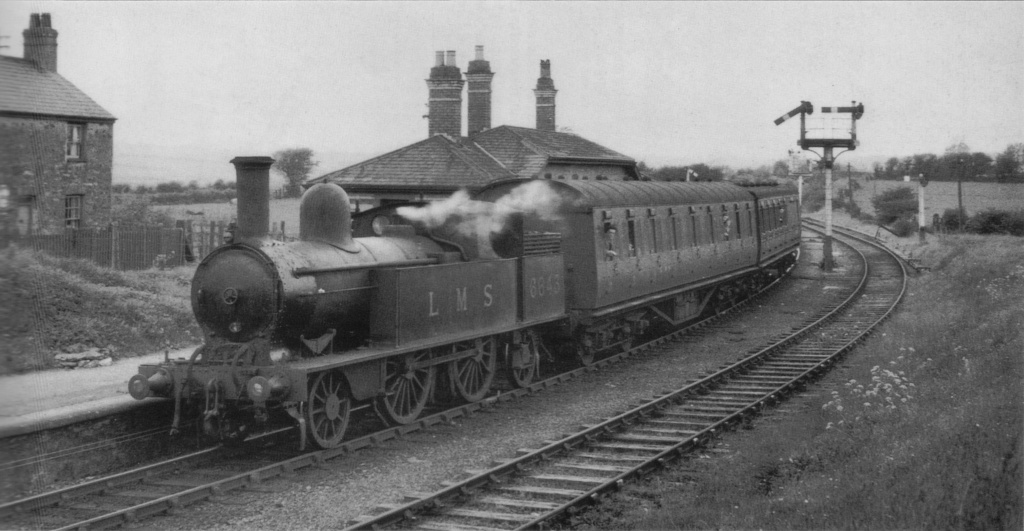
LMS continued to operate LNWR-built engines on the line. Pictured is an ex-LNWR 2-4-2T (5'6") leaving Holland Arms in April 1945

In 1923 Britain's numerous railway companies were grouped into the "Big Four", and the LNWR's assets became part of the London, Midland and Scottish Railway (LMS).

Holland Arms' functionality as a staff station was only useful for the Red Wharf Bay branch, but a signalman was still required for all Amlwch services. In about 1925, LMS introduced a switching-out system that could turn the Gaerwen-Holland Arms and Holland Arms-Llangefni sections into one long section. This was of particular advantage in the early mornings and evenings, when the only services were on the Amlwch line.

The July 1924 timetable showed eight passenger trains each way between Amlwch and Gaerwen, with the Red Wharf Bay railmotor operating to Llangefni three times a day. The extra Thursday service to Llangefni for the market was still included. By the summer of 1929, there were eight trains from Gaerwen to Amlwch, and seven in the other direction. One train to and from Amlwch no longer ran Thursdays, replaced by a second two return trip to Llangefni, operated by the railmotor. The loop at Llangwyllog now saw three pairs of passenger trains passing on weekdays, while the daily freight train would be shunted into sidings at Llangefni and Llanerchymedd to make way. Motor train services were back up to 24 single trips a day, including the Red Wharf Bay services.

The Great Depression brought a number of cutbacks to Anglesey's railways. The withdrawal of passenger services on the Red Wharf Bay branch in September 1930 affected the Amlwch line, as the motor train that operated the extra Gaerwen–Llangefni services was withdrawn. Amlwch's engine shed was closed on 14 September 1931, with all trains being worked from Bangor. As the economy recovered, the number of Gaerwen–Amlwch services was increased. The summer of 1938 saw ten down and eight up trains for passengers, with eleven each way on Saturdays.

=== 1946–1993: British Railways/British Rail ===
A dam was built across the Cefni river north of Llangefni in the late 1940s to increase the water supply available to the island. The new reservoir, Llyn Cefni, crossed the railway's trackbed, and a bridge was built to support it. A second reservoir, Llyn Alaw, was formed adjacent to the railway north of Llanerchymedd in the 1960s, but did not interfere with the line's alignment.

Passenger numbers at Holland Arms station had fallen since the end of passenger services on the Red Wharf Bay branch. The branch was closed to all traffic in 1950, and Holland Arms closed on 4 August 1952.

Under British Rail, many passenger services on the Amlwch branch operated through to Bangor, removing the need to change trains at Gaerwen. An early three-coach British United Traction (A.E.C.) diesel multiple unit train was trialled on the line in May 1953. The train was economical in fuel use, and did not require a fireman, but train passengers and crew complained at the very rough ride – rattling windows a particular complaint. As part of British Rail's Modernisation Plan, Derby Lightweight DMUs were introduced three years later. A 1956 brochure advertised day return tickets from Bangor to Amlwch for 4s.4d, or Llangefni for 11d. Steam engines continued to be used for freight trains, and for extra workings such as Saturday trains. Steam returned for all passenger trains in the summers of 1963 and 1964 due to a shortage of DMUs.

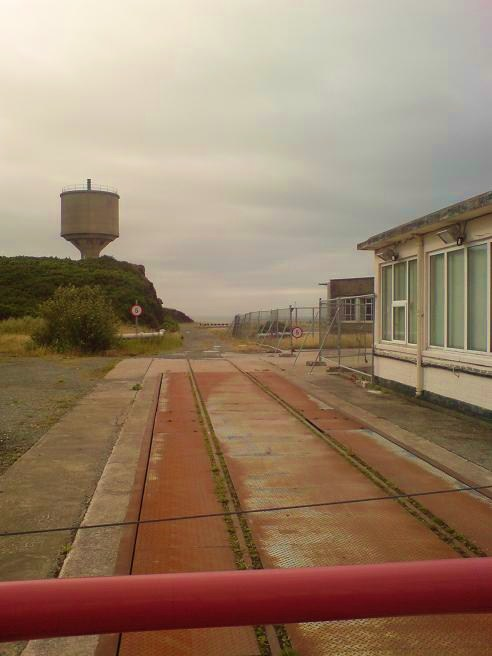
The railway was extended through Amlwch to the Octel works (pictured in 2010)

A bromine extraction plant was opened in Amlwch in 1953 by Associated Ethyl (soon renamed Associated Octel, and later part of the Great Lakes Chemical Corporation). Chlorine produced at a plant in Ellesmere Port was brought by rail to Amlwch, which was used to extract bromine from sea water. The resulting ethylene dibromide was taken from Amlwch by rail as well. The company built a light railway through the town to Amlwch station, and a marshalling yard for exchanging freight wagons.

==== Run down and closure ====
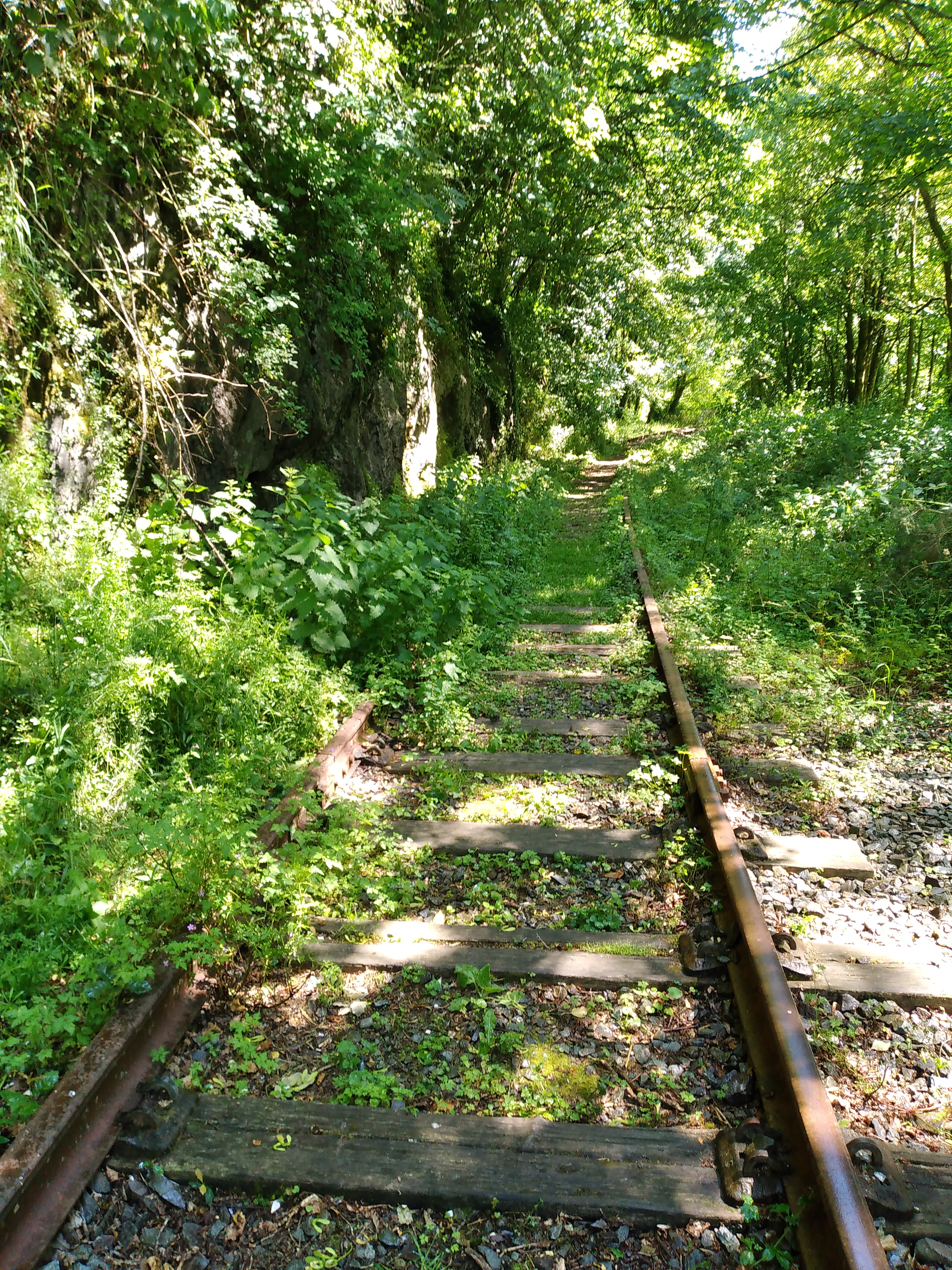
Anglesey Central Railway Llangefni 2022

The line stopped carrying passengers on 5 December 1964, as part of the rationalisation known as the Beeching Axe. All stations were closed, and all goods yards, passing loops and sidings removed, except the marshalling yard for the Octel freight. Octel's freight traffic totaled 70,000 tons annually, and the railway was kept in order to serve this traffic. Local freight services ceased, and the electric staff system was withdrawn, so that only one train could be on the branch at a time, although that was sufficient for Octel's requirements. The double junction at Gaerwen was also remodelled. Once the freight trains were being worked by diesel locomotives, arrangements were made for the British Rail engines to operate all the way to the plant.

Amlwch station was demolished when the adjacent road was rebuilt. A nearby warehouse now houses a visitor centre with a model railway and exhibitions. Llanerchymedd station became the property of the local council, and reopened as a heritage centre, museum and community café in 2010. Other stations passed into private ownership.

A spur was built near Rhosgoch to facilitate the building of an oil tank farm in the 1970s. This was built to receive oil from tankers moored offshore in the deep waters off Amlwch, before it was pumped to the Stanlow Refinery in Cheshire. The site was decommissioned after a short life, but the short spur remains.

A Class 31 locomotive, number 31296, was named 'Amlwch Freighter'/'Trên Nwyddau Amlwch' in September 1986 at the Associated Octel plant. At this point, 33 years after the opening of the Octel plant at Amlwch, 2 million tonnes of traffic had been conveyed from their freight terminal. A scale model was produced by Lima with this nameplate affixed. The name was removed in March 1990 and transferred to the Class 47 locomotive 47330, which was renumbered 47390 for a period, retaining the name. This locomotive was later rebuilt as a Class 57, and renamed 'The Hood' by its new operator, Virgin Trains.

A few special passenger services were subsequently operated, notably in 1969, 1983 and 1992/93. In 1993, Octel's daily freight traffic was transferred to road haulage, for safety reasons, and traffic thus ceased on the line. The Octel plant closed in 2003, and has since been demolished.

== Rolling stock ==
The ACR hired rolling stock from the LNWR for their inaugural services. When Dickson was operating the line from 1866 to 1868, he used the following engines:

Name	Image	Type	Builder	Operational	Notes
Mountaineer		0-4-4-0T	James Cross & Co., St. Helens, Lancs	1866 – c. 1867	Fairlie engine. Transferred to Neath and Brecon Railway c.1867.
Anglesea	No known image	0-6-0WT	Hawthorns & Co, Leith, Scotland	c. 1867	Originally named Miers, after the first chairman of the Neath and Brecon. Miers was also a director of the ACR. It was later returned.

From 1868, the LNWR provided rolling stock again, until their acquisition of the line in 1876. The following types of engine have been noted as being used on the line since:

Image	Type	Builder	Operational	Notes
	Webb 2-4-2T (5 ft 6in)	LNWR	Until 1948	Main engine type for passenger trains. Webb 0-6-2T Coal Tanks, among others, noted as well.
	Various Webb 0-6-0 tender engines	LNWR	Until 1948	Main engine type for freight trains. Would work tender-first from Bangor, as there was no turntable available.
	Webb 2-4-0T 'Chopper'	LNWR	1908 – c. 1915	Operated Red Wharf Bay railmotor train.
	Webb 2-4-2T 'Radial' (4 ft 6in)	LNWR	c. 1915–1930	Operated Red Wharf Bay railmotor train.
	Ivatt 2MT 2-6-2T	LMS	1948 – late 1950s	Used for freight and passenger trains. Reintroduced for the summer passenger trains of 1963 and 1964 due to DMU shortages.
See for images	Diesel railcar	British United Traction	May 1953	Trialled on the line. Economical in fuel consumption, but gave a rough, noisy ride.
	Ivatt Class 2 2-6-0	LMS	late 1950s – 1960s	Used for freight trains
	Derby Lightweight	British Rail (Derby Works)	1956–1964	First regular DMU. Some other varieties were also used on the line

Diesel engines were used for the Octel freight after British Rail's withdrawal of steam engines. A railfan website notes Class 24, Class 40, and Class 47 as having been used for the freight services, as well as the 1983 special passenger services. The 1992 specials used Class 101 DMU units, and the 1993 special used Class 20 and Class 37 engines.

== Preservation and redevelopment attempts ==
The continuation of Octel Freight Traffic until 1993 ensured that not only was the trackbed kept whole, but the majority of the rail infrastructure was still in situ. As such, the Amlwch line was well suited to preservation as a heritage railway, or see a return of mainline services. The continued role of Llangefni as an administrative and commercial centre led British Rail and Gwynedd County Council to consider restoring passenger services between Llangefni and Bangor in the late 1980s, but the idea was turned down.

=== Isle of Anglesey Railways Ltd ===
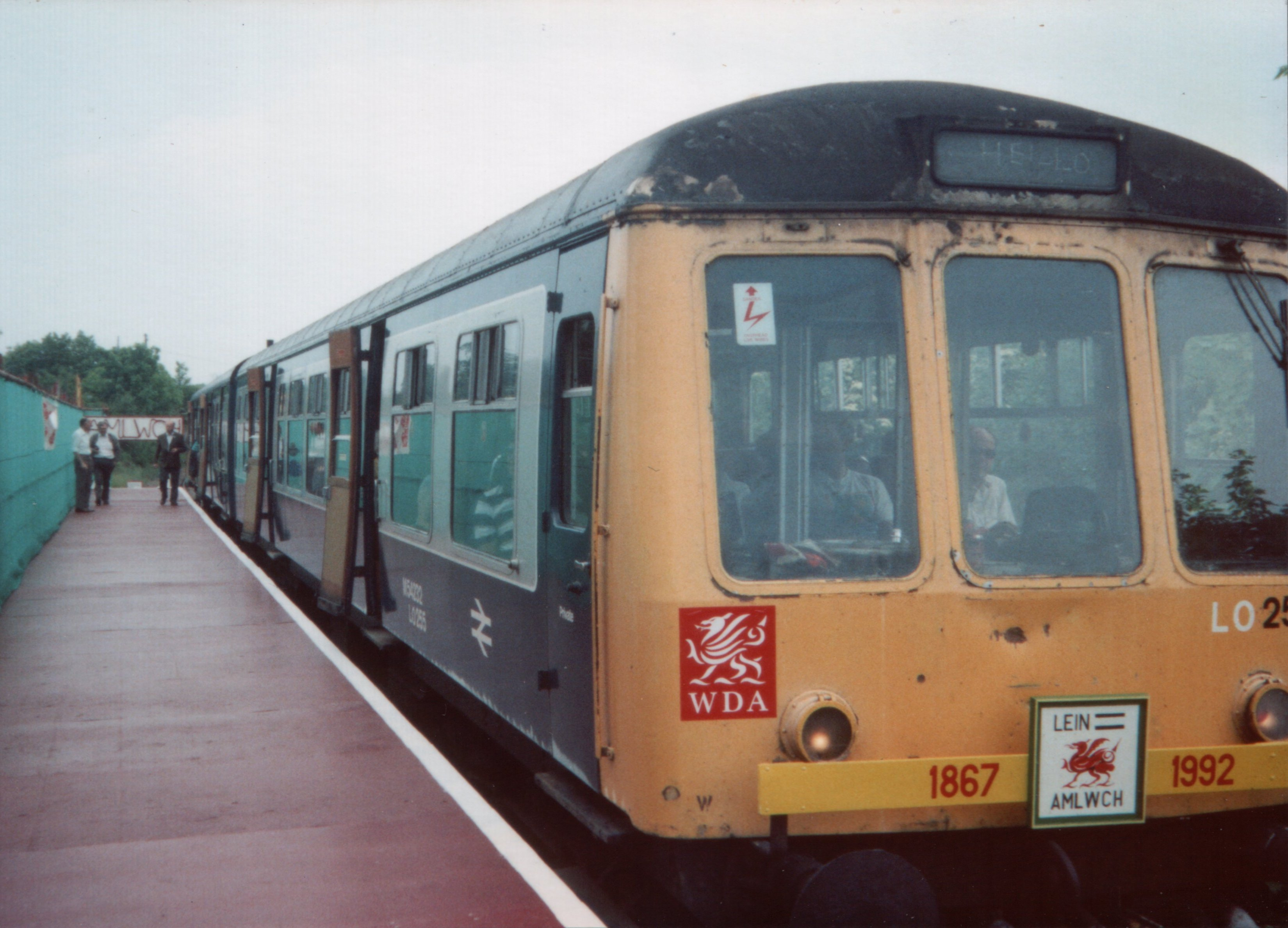
A spring bank holiday special stands at a temporary station at Amlwch, 1992

After a public meeting in Amlwch to gauge local support, Isle of Anglesey Railways Ltd (IoAR) was established in 1991 with the aim of restoring passenger services to the line. Special trains ran from Bangor to a temporary station at Amlwch on the spring and August bank holidays of 1992, and the 125th anniversary of the line's opening (a total of eight return trips). Pathfinder Tours subsequently ran an excursion from York to Llandudno and Amlwch in October 1993. The project's viability was discussed with the Welsh Development Agency and Anglesey District Council, followed by negotiations in July 1993 with Railfreight Distribution to purchase the line. Octel offered a portion of its private railway for the building of a new station at Amlwch. IoAR initially hoped to start passenger services between Amlwch and Llangefni as early as 1994.

The privatisation of British Rail in the mid-1990s disrupted this process. The post-privatisation owner Railtrack's asking price of £300,000 in 1996 required seeking grants from the European Commission. With no traffic or maintenance, the line started to become overgrown. In the meantime, Sustrans proposed the railway should be converted into a cycle route, similar to the Lôn Eifion cycle route which follows the path of the former Carnarvonshire Railway from Caernarfon to Afon Wen. In 1998–99 surveys of the railway bridges showed their condition to be "better than expected". A petition of 7,000 signatures was presented to Anglesey County Council in January 1999, calling for better cycling facilities on the island, and particularly a cycle path from Amlwch to Gaerwen. Support for the railway option was demonstrated by a charter train named the Lein Amlwch Venturer, hauled by 6024 King Edward I, which ran from Crewe to Gaerwen junction on Saturday 23 January.

Anglesey County Council was planning to buy the track in support of the railway in 2000, but was later reported as having withdrawn its support for IoAR in May 2001. Five months later Railtrack was placed in administration, and ownership of Britain's railways (including the Amlwch line) was transferred to Network Rail in October 2002.

=== Cycle route ===
Tourism Partnership North Wales's 2003 report was supportive of the possibility of implementing both a heritage railway and cycle route side by side. Anglesey County Council was considering both options again according to a 2005 report. The managing director of Anglesey County Council wrote a letter of support in principle to Anglesey Central Railway (2006) Ltd in January 2006, but councillors voted in favour of a "cycle, walking and bridle path route" in March 2007, contributing £5,000 toward a feasibility study days before ACR(2006) Ltd were told that the lease of the railway from Network Rail had been approved. The council voted in favour of a cycle route motion in October 2007, and Network Rail informed ACR(2006) Ltd that the lease was on hold due to the council's reversal of policy. The motion's proposer stated that "high-level negotiations" were taking place between Network Rail and cycle route advocates. A potential compromise was identified as using the Amlwch-Llanerchymedd portion as a cycle route, and the Llanerchymedd-Gaerwen portion as a railway. The General Secretary of ACR(2006) Ltd noted in early 2008 that until a lease was agreed, ACR(2006) Ltd could not conduct any work on the line. Network Rail's business plans from 2005 to 2007 made reference to proposals for the sale or lease of the line, but the 2008 business plan made no such reference, simply showing the line as non-operational.

=== Change of direction ===
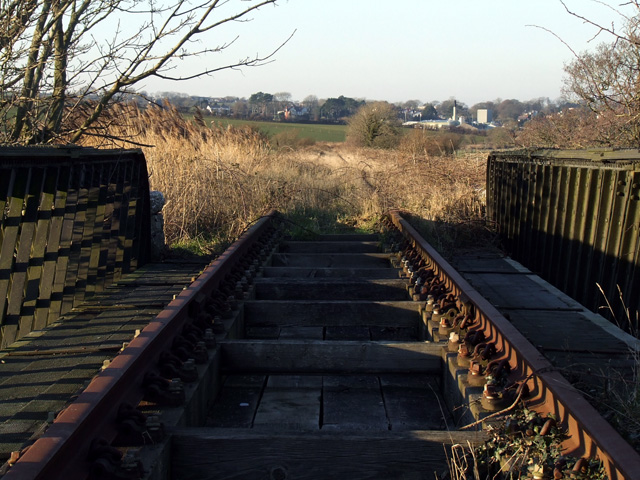
With no trains passing for over fifteen years, portions of the railway have become severely overgrown. (More images)

Local council elections were held in May 2008, resulting in a change of leadership at Anglesey County Council. The County Council's Economic Development Representative expressed his desire to see the railway line reopened at a meeting of Llangefni Town Council in November 2008, an opinion echoed by a number of the town councillors. 80% of correspondence to the Holyhead and Anglesey Mail on the topic during 2008 was in support of the railway proposal.

=== 2009 status ===
The line remains property of Network Rail, with Anglesey County Council a statutory consultee on the future use of the route. The track is now in a poor state of repair, with gorse bushes and small saplings growing between the tracks in some locations. Network Rail officially designated the branch "out of use" for operational purposes in January 2009, after consultation with English Welsh & Scottish, who favoured its restoration to a working railway with the opportunity for freight traffic.

Sustrans announced renewed plans for a cycle route along 16 miles (26 km) of the line (the majority of its length) on 5 March 2009, along with a belief that the route can be used for both a cycle path and heritage railway. Planning applications are to be developed in cooperation with ACR Ltd, Anglesey County Council and Network Rail.

== Reopening ==
In 2009 the Welsh Assembly Government asked Network Rail to conduct feasibility studies on two former track stretches in Wales, one of those being the line from Bangor to Llangefni. Councillor Clive McGregor was optimistic this could provide an economic stimulus for Anglesey, along with further proposals to extend passenger traffic between Llangefni and Amlwch. In 2011 Network Rail began work on gathering evidence for its study, beginning with cutting away vegetation on track sections to examine the condition of rails and track bedding. Its report was expected to be published in 2012, before any business cases to reopen the lines could be developed.

The study, which started in January 2011, began by assessing the condition of the line between Gaerwen and Llangefni. The track, bridges, associated earthworks, and the station at Llangefni were examined by engineers in order to decide whether they were still fit for purpose, or would need to be updated. With the alignment having succumbed to heavy encroachment from vegetation, an environmental report would have to be drawn up to limit the potential damage that could be caused to wildlife. Mike Gallop, coordinating the project on behalf of Network Rail, warned that bringing back trains to the line would be "tough".

The remainder of the line, between Llangefni and Amlwch, looks set to be preserved as a heritage railway, with Network Rail giving licence to Anglesey Central Railway Limited to begin clearing the overgrown line north of Llangefni. ACR started to clear vegetation from the line in Llangefni before Christmas 2012. ACR Limited's support group, Lein Amlwch, have also opened a small shop, cafe and heritage centre in Llanerchymedd's station building, which will be open during the summer months.

In December 2017, it was proposed that the line could reopen as part of a plan to reopen lines closed by British Rail.

In October 2018, the railway bridge at Llangefni was demolished following a lorry strike. The Welsh Assembly called for the repair of the A5114 bridge at Llangefni and reinstatement of the line but the bridge has not been replaced.

In August 2020, a bid was made for money to carry out a study to reopen the line between Amlwch and the north Wales main line at Gaerwen. This was for funding from the Government's Restoring Your Railways fund. The bid was successful in the third round of the Restoring Your Railway initiative. When the bid was submitted, the Welsh government stated that they would match fund any award that was received, raising the value of the award to £100,000.

In April 2021, ACR Ltd completed the process of gaining a 99-year lease for the whole 17 1/2 miles (28.2 km) of the branch line from Gaerwen to Amlwch. This was a big step forward for the re-opening of the line, as well as a multi-use pathway running parallel to the line.

An alternate proposal suggests reopening the railway as a light rail.
