= The Dingle, Anglesey =

Local nature reserve in Wales

Coordinates: 53.262°N 4.320°W

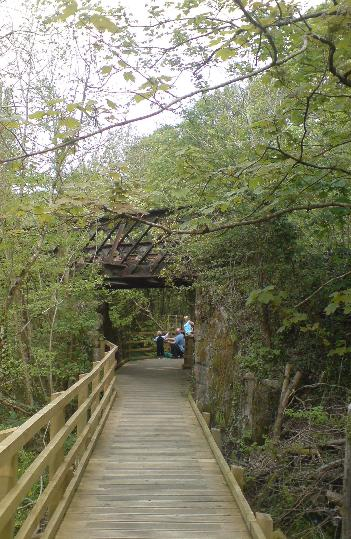
The Boardwalk

The Dingle (Welsh: Nant y Pandy) is a nature reserve found just to the north of Llangefni, Anglesey, north Wales. Dingle is a common placename in the English language, which means "steep wooded valley", which describes it well. However, like many similar English names for natural attractions in Wales, e.g. Fairy Glen, the English name is recent and probably coined as tourism developed. The original Welsh name, still used by locals, is Nant y Pandy (Fulling Mill Brook), as there used to be a wool processing plant in the valley. The park is naturally divided into two parts, the wooded southern half and the northern half which is in a clearing. The main entrance is by St Cyngar’s Church where there is a car park.

The reserve is 25 acres (10 ha) in area and is bisected by the Afon Cefni (River Cefni). It was formed by glaciers during the last ice age as they eroded the soft rock of the area. It gained its current name in the 1830s and was designated as a local nature reserve in 1995, although there has been a blanket tree preservation order in place since 1971. In 2003 the reserve was granted £122,000 for major improvements including better disabled access, boardwalks and tree sculptures. It was awarded the UK MAB Urban Wildlife Award For Excellence in 2004 thanks to this work. The boardwalks allow visitors to make their way north to Llyn Cefni, travelling parallel to the disused tracks of the Anglesey Central Railway. Red squirrels can be found in the area.

According to some stories, pumas live in Nant y Pandy. In the 1970s big cats were banned from being pets, so many people came to North Wales to let their cats loose.
