= Rhosmeirch =

Village in Anglesey, Wales

Coordinates: 53°16′27″N 4°18′38″W

Rhosmeirch (Welsh pronunciation) is a small village in Anglesey, Wales. It is in the community of Llangefni.

It is located 1 1/2 miles (2.4 km) north of the county town, Llangefni, and half a mile east of the reservoir Llyn Cefni, with a village hall and a park.

The village is the home of the Oriel Môn gallery which exhibits the work of local painter Kyffin Williams, widely regarded as the defining artist of Wales during the 20th century.
