= Charles Tunnicliffe =

British naturalistic painter (1901–1979)

Charles Frederick Tunnicliffe
- Born: 1 December 1901; Langley, Cheshire, England
- Died: 7 February 1979 (aged 77); Malltraeth, Anglesey, Wales
- Awards: Fellow of the Royal Academy; RSPB Gold Medal; OBE

Charles Frederick Tunnicliffe, OBE, RA (1 December 1901 – 7 February 1979) was an internationally renowned naturalistic painter of British birds and other wildlife. He spent most of his working life on the Isle of Anglesey. He is popularly known for his illustrations for the novel Tarka the Otter.

== Life ==
Tunnicliffe was born in 1901 in Langley, Macclesfield, England, the fourth surviving child of William Tunnicliffe (died 20 June 1925) of Lane Ends Farm, Sutton, near Macclesfield, a tenant farmer, formerly a boot and shoemaker, and Margaret (died 21 February 1942). He spent his early years living on the farm at Sutton, where he saw much wildlife. As a young boy he attended Sutton St. James' C.E. Primary School, and in 1916 he began to study at the Macclesfield School of Art. He went on to win a scholarship to the Royal College of Art in London.

He married in 1929 at the Methodist Church, Whalley Range, Manchester, to Winifred Wonnacott (24 June 1902 – 27 June 1969), a fellow art student, from Hollywood, near Belfast.

In 1947 he moved from Manchester to a house called "Shorelands" at Malltraeth, on the estuary of the Afon Cefni on Anglesey, where he lived until his death in 1979.

== Work ==
Tunnicliffe worked in several media, including watercolour painting, etching and aquatint, wood engraving, woodcut, scraperboard (sometimes called scratchboard), and oil painting.

A Snowy Owl, Anglesey, date unknown.

Much of Tunnicliffe's work depicted birds in their natural settings and other naturalistic scenes. He illustrated Henry Williamson's 1927 novel Tarka the Otter. His work was also used to illustrate Brooke Bond tea cards and as a result was seen by millions of young people in the United Kingdom during the 1950s and 1960s. He also illustrated a number of books, including the Ladybird books. His work was characterised by its precision and accuracy, but also by the way in which he was able to portray birds as they were seen in nature rather than as stiff scientific studies.

In 1951, Tunnicliffe drew an image of a takahē for the Ornithological Society of New Zealand, which since 1952 has been used for covers of the organisation's publications, including the society's journal Notornis.

From March 1953, he painted many of the cover illustrations for the Royal Society for the Protection of Birds's (RSPB) magazine Bird Notes, and several for the later Birds magazines. Two of the originals are on long-term loan to the gallery at Oriel Ynys Môn, but in 1995 the RSPB sold 114 at a Sotheby's auction, raising £210,000; the most expensive being a picture of a partridge, which sold for £6,440.

At his death, there was some dispute over Tunnicliffe's real intention for his body of work. However, much of his personal collection of work was finally bequeathed to Anglesey council on the condition that it was housed together and made available for public viewing. This body of work can now be seen at Oriel Ynys Môn (The Anglesey Gallery) near Llangefni.

His work is still celebrated with the Charles and Winifred Tunnicliffe Memorial Art Competition, which is held annually at Hollinhey Primary School, Sutton Lane Ends, which itself is built on land which was formerly part of the farm he lived on as a boy.

== Honours ==
- 1944 – Associate of the Royal Academy
- 1954 – Fellow of the Royal Academy
- 1975 – RSPB Gold Medal
- 1978 – OBE

Tunnicliffe was the subject of a 1981 BBC Wales television documentary, True to Nature, produced by Derek Trimby and narrated by Robert Dougall.

== Bibliography ==
At least 250 books used Tunnicliffe's illustrations, including:

- 1932 – Tarka the Otter by Henry Williamson. Putnam: London.
- 1933 – The Lone Swallows, and other essays of boyhood and youth, by Henry Williamson. Putnam.
- 1933 – The Old Stag and Other Hunting Stories, by Henry Williamson. Putnam.
- 1933 – On Foot in Devon. Or, Guidance and Gossip being a Monologue in Two Reels, by Henry Williamson. Alexander Maclehose & Co: London.
- 1933 – The Star-Born, by Henry Williamson. Faber: London.
- 1934 – Beasts Royal, by Patrick Russ (Patrick O'Brian). Putnam.
- 1934 – The Peregrine's Saga and Other Wild Tales, by Henry Williamson. Putnam.
- 1934 – Tales from Ebony, by Harcourt Williams. Putnam.
- 1936 – Pool and Rapid. The story of a river, by R. L. Haig-Brown. Cape: London.
- 1936 – Salar the Salmon, by Henry Williamson. Faber.
- 1937 – Ambush of Young Days, by Alison Uttley. Faber.
- 1937 – A Book of Birds, by Mary Priestley. Gollancz: London.
- 1937 – The Sky's Their Highway, by Kenneth Williamson. Putnam.
- 1940 – The Seasons and the Gardener: A Book for Children, by H. E. Bates. CUP.
- 1940 – Wonders of Nature: How Animals and Plants Live and Behave in Relation to Their Natural Surroundings, by C. F. Tunnicliffe. Odham's Press.
- 1941 – Nature Abounding, by E. L. Grant Watson. Faber.
- 1941 – Profitable Wonders: Some Problems of Plant & Animal Life, by E. L. Grant Watson. Country Life: London.
- 1941 – The Seasons and the Fisherman: A Book for Children, by Frank Fraser Darling. CUP.
- 1941 – The Seasons and the Woodman: A Book for Children, by D. H. Chapman
- 1941 – The Story of a Norfolk Farm, by Henry Williamson. Faber.
- 1942 – In the Heart of the Country, by H. E. Bates. Country Life.
- 1942 – My Country Book, by C. F. Tunnicliffe. The Studio: London.
- 1942 – Going Fishing: The story of some rods and the places they take you to, by Negley Farson. Country Life.
- 1943 – O More Than Happy Countryman, by H. E. Bates. Country Life.
- 1943 – Walking with Fancy, by E. L. Grant Watson. Country Life.
- 1944 – Exploring England: an introduction to nature craft, by Charles S. Bayne. Collins: London.
- 1944 – The Seasons and the Farmer: A Book for Children, by Frank Fraser Darling. CUP.
- 1945 – Bird Portraiture, by C. F. Tunnicliffe. (How to Do It series No.35). The Studio: London.
- 1945 – Call of the Birds, by Charles S. Bayne. Collins. (First published 1929, revised 1945).
- 1945 – Farmer Jim, by D. H. Chapman. George Harrap & Co.
- 1945 – Green Tide, by Richard Church. Country Life.
- 1945 – My Friend Flicka, by Mary O'Hara. Eyre & Spottiswoode.
- 1946 – Country Things, by Alison Uttley. Faber.
- 1946 – Happy Countryman, by C H. Warren. Eyre & Spottiswoode.
- 1946 – Wandering with Nomad. Thrilling Adventures Among the Wild Life of the Countryside, by Norman Ellison. University of London Press.
- 1947 – Angling Conclusions, by W. F. R. Reynolds. Faber.
- 1947 – How to Draw Farm Animals by C. F. Tunnicliffe. The Studio: London.
- 1947 – The Leaves Return, by E. L. Grant Watson. Country Life.
- 1947 – The Long Flight, by Terence Horsley. Country Life.
- 1947 – Fishing and Flying, by Terence Horsley. Eyre & Spottiswoode.
- 1947 – Our Bird Book, by Sidney Rogerson. Collins.
- 1947 – Out of Doors with Nomad, by Norman Ellison. University of London Press.
- 1948 – Carts and Candlesticks, by Alison Uttley. Faber.
- 1948 – The Cinnamon Bird, by Ronald Lockley. Staples Press.
- 1948 – Mereside Chronicle: with a short interlude of lochs and lochans, by C. F. Tunnicliffe. Country Life.
- 1948 – Over the hills with Nomad: More Adventures in Search of Our Wild Life, by Norman Frederick Ellison. University of London Press.
- 1949 – Both Sides of the Road. A Book about Farming, by Sidney Rogerson. Collins.
- 1949 – Rivermouth, by Brian Vesey-Fitzgerald. Eyre & Spottiswoode: London.
- 1949 – Roving with Nomad, by Norman Ellison. University of London Press.
- 1949 – Wild Life in a Southern County, by Richard Jefferies. Lutterworth Press.
- 1950 – Adventuring with Nomad, by Norman Ellison. University of London Press.
- 1950 – Island of Skomer, by John Buxton and Ronald Lockley. Staples Press.
- 1951 – Punchbowl Midnight, by Monica Edwards. Collins.
- 1951 – Northwards with Nomad, by Norman Ellison. University of London Press.
- 1952 – Birds of the Estuary, by C. F. Tunnicliffe. Penguin Books.
- 1952 – Plowmen's Clocks, by Alison Uttley. Faber.
- 1952 – Shorelands Summer Diary, by C. F. Tunnicliffe. Macmillan.
- 1952 – Under the Sea Wind – A Naturalist's Picture of Ocean Life, by Rachel Carson. Staples Press: London. (First UK edition).
- 1953 – The Old Man and the Sea, by Ernest Hemingway, C .F. Tunnicliffe and Raymond Sheppard. Reprint Society. (First illustrated edition).
- 1953 – Puffins, by Ronald Lockley. Dent: London.
- 1956 – Here's a New Day, by Alison Uttley. Faber.
- 1957 – Come Out of Doors, by C. D. Dimsdale. Hutchinson: London.
- 1957 – A Year in the Country, by Alison Uttley. Faber.
- 1959 – The Swans fly over, by Alison Uttley. Faber.
- 1959 – What to look for in Winter, by E. L. Grant Watson. (Ladybird Nature Book series 536). Wills & Hepworth: Loughborough.
- 1960 – The Horse in the Furrow, by George Ewart Evans. Faber & Faber.
- 1960 – Something for Nothing: Twelve Essays, by Alison Uttley. Faber & Faber.
- 1960 – What to look for in Autumn, by E. L. Grant Watson. (Ladybird Nature Book series 536). Wills & Hepworth: Loughborough.
- 1960 – What to look for in Summer, by E. L. Grant Watson. (Ladybird Nature Book series 536). Wills & Hepworth: Loughborough.
- 1961 – British Birds of the Wild Places, by J. Wentworth Day. Blandford: London.
- 1961 – What to look for in Spring, by E. L. Grant Watson. (Ladybird Nature Book series 536). Wills & Hepworth: Loughborough.
- 1962 – Wild Honey, by Alison Uttley. Faber.
- 1963 – The Farm, by M. E. Gagg. Wills & Hepworth Ltd.
- 1964 – Cuckoo in June, by Alison Uttley. Faber.
- 1966 – Dawn, Dusk and Deer, by Arthur Cadman. Country Life.
- 1966 – A Peck of Gold, by Alison Uttley. Faber.
- 1967 – A Galloway Childhood, by Ian Niall. Heinemann.
- 1968 – The Button-Box and Other Essays, by Alison Uttley. Faber.
- 1968 – A Fowler's World: an account of days on the marsh and estuary, by Ian Niall. Heinemann.
- 1968 – Know Your Broadleaves, by H. L. Edlin. (Forestry Commission Booklet No 20). HMSO: London.
- 1969 – The Country Child, by Alison Uttley. Penguin Books: Middlesex.
- 1969 – The Island, by Ronald Lockley. André Deutsch.
- 1969 – The Valley, by Elizabeth Clarke. Faber.
- 1972 – Secret Places and other Essays, by Alison Uttley. Faber.
- 1978 – Up with the Country Lark, by Nellie Brocklehurst. Arthur H. Stockwell: Devon. ISBN 0-7223-1097-8
- 1979 – RSPB Book of Garden Birds, by Linda Bennett. Hamlyn. ISBN 0-600-31422-7
- 1979 – A Sketchbook of Birds, by C. F. Tunnicliffe, with an introduction by Ian Niall. Gollancz. ISBN 0-575-02640-5
- 1980 – Portrait of a Country Artist. Charles Tunnicliffe R.A. 1901–1979, by Ian Niall. Gollancz. ISBN 0-575-02868-8
- 1981 – Sketches of Birdlife, with introduction and commentary by Robert Gillmor. Gollancz. ISBN 0-575-03036-4
- 1984 – Country World, by Alison Uttley. Faber. ISBN 0-571-13328-2
- 1984 – Tunnicliffe's Birds, by C. F. Tunnicliffe. Little Brown: Boston. (First US edition). ISBN 1-199-07825-5
- 1986 – The Happy Countryman, by H. E. Bates. Salem House Publishers: USA. ISBN 0-948164-23-9
- 1986 – The Peverel Papers. A Yearbook of the Countryside, by Flora Thompson; ed. J. Shuckburgh. Century: London. ISBN 0-7126-1296-3
- 1986 – Tunnicliffe's Countryside, by C. F. Tunnicliffe. HarperCollins. ISBN 0-907745-02-4
- 1992 – Shorelands Winter Diary, by C. F. Tunnicliffe. Constable and Robinson. ISBN 1-85487-139-0
- 1993 – The Way of a Countryman, by Ian Niall. White Lion. ISBN 978-1-874762-04-1
- 1996 – The Peregrine Sketchbook, by C. F. Tunnicliffe, Robert Gillmor, Derek Ratcliffe. Excellent Press. ISBN 978-1-900318-02-0

== See also ==
- List of wildlife artists
