= Llyn Cefni =

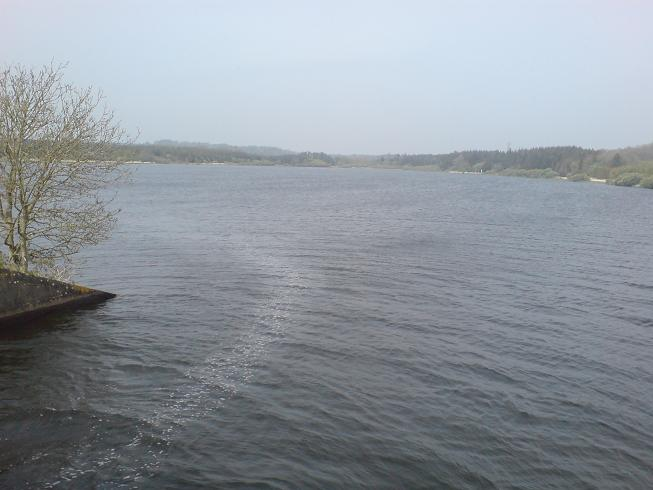
- The eastern side

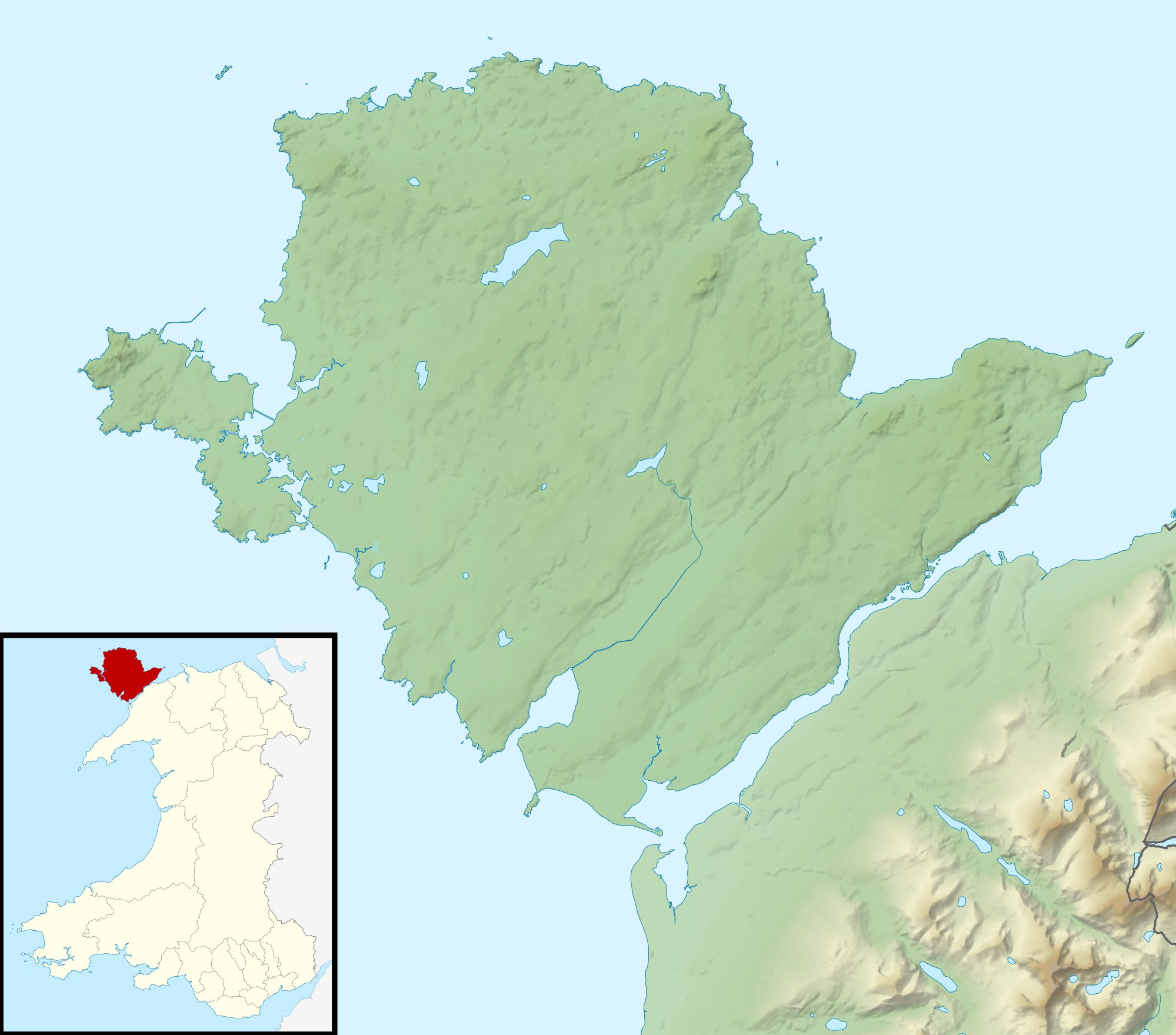
- Location within Anglesey
- Location: Anglesey, Wales
- Coordinates: 53°16′16″N 4°20′8″W
- Type: Reservoir
- Primary outflows: Afon Cefni
- Basin countries: United Kingdom
- Max. length: 2.3 km (1.4 mi)
- Surface area: 86 ha (210 acres)
- Water volume: 400 million imperial gallons (1.8 hm^{3}; 1,500 acre⋅ft)

Llyn Cefni is a small reservoir in the centre of Anglesey, Wales which is managed by Welsh Water and Hamdden Ltd, while the fishery is managed by the Cefni Angling Association. The reservoir is located just 1 kilometre (0.6 mi) northwest of the island's county town of Llangefni.

== History ==
During World War II, a water scheme was devised for the town of Llangefni in central Anglesey. It involved water from a local source being pumped to two settling tanks in the Dingle part of the town. From here the water was pumped across the river to a reservoir and water tower, on the site of the present Pennant Estate. These arrangements became redundant with the building of the Cefni Reservoir, which was completed in 1951, but the settling tanks and pumping station survive in Llangefni to this day. The new scheme was designed to supply most of the water needs for the people of Anglesey for the foreseeable future.

== Geography ==
The Afon Cefni is one of the main rivers of Anglesey. It was dammed about 1 mi (1.6 km) northwest of Llangefni, just below the confluence of the tributary from Tregaian with other streams flowing from the northwest, and the reservoir has a catchment area of about 9,400 acres (3,800 ha).

The reservoir is fed by two main streams, the Afon Frogwy entering from the west and the Afon Erddreiniog from the north east end. With a maximum length of 2.3 kilometres (1.4 mi) and a total water surface area of 86 hectares (210 acres), Llyn Cefni is the second largest body of water on the island after Llyn Alaw, also a reservoir. There is a dam on the south-east edge of the reservoir, next to which is a car park. The northeastern end of the reservoir and the immediate surrounding area have been designated as a nature reserve, and as a further measure of conservation, a plantation of trees runs along its north shore. The tracks of the Anglesey Central Railway, although no longer used, still run over an embankment which crosses the water. The reservoir is easily accessible from Llangefni, as well defined paths run from the town through the local nature reserve, The Dingle, one of the few ancient woodland sites on the island. It can also be accessed by the Lôn Las Cefni cycleway which follows the Afon Cefni from The Dingle and divides at the dam.

In the summer of 2011, toxic blue-green algae were found in the reservoir and visitors were advised to avoid contact with the water.

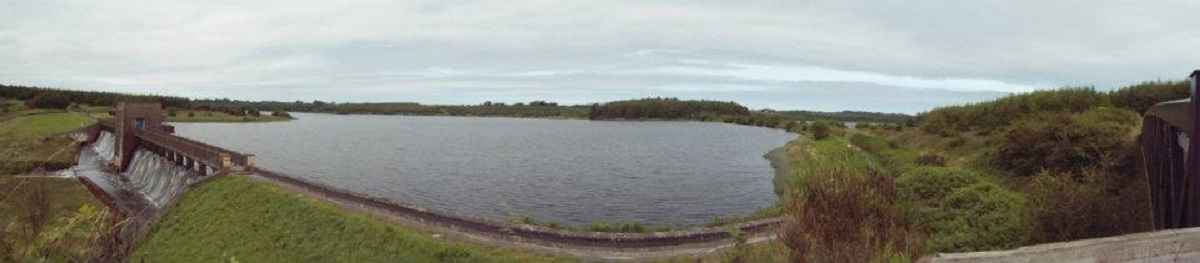
A photo of the dam and Llyn in 2012
