= Penrallt =

Coordinates: 53.256938°N 4.317440°W

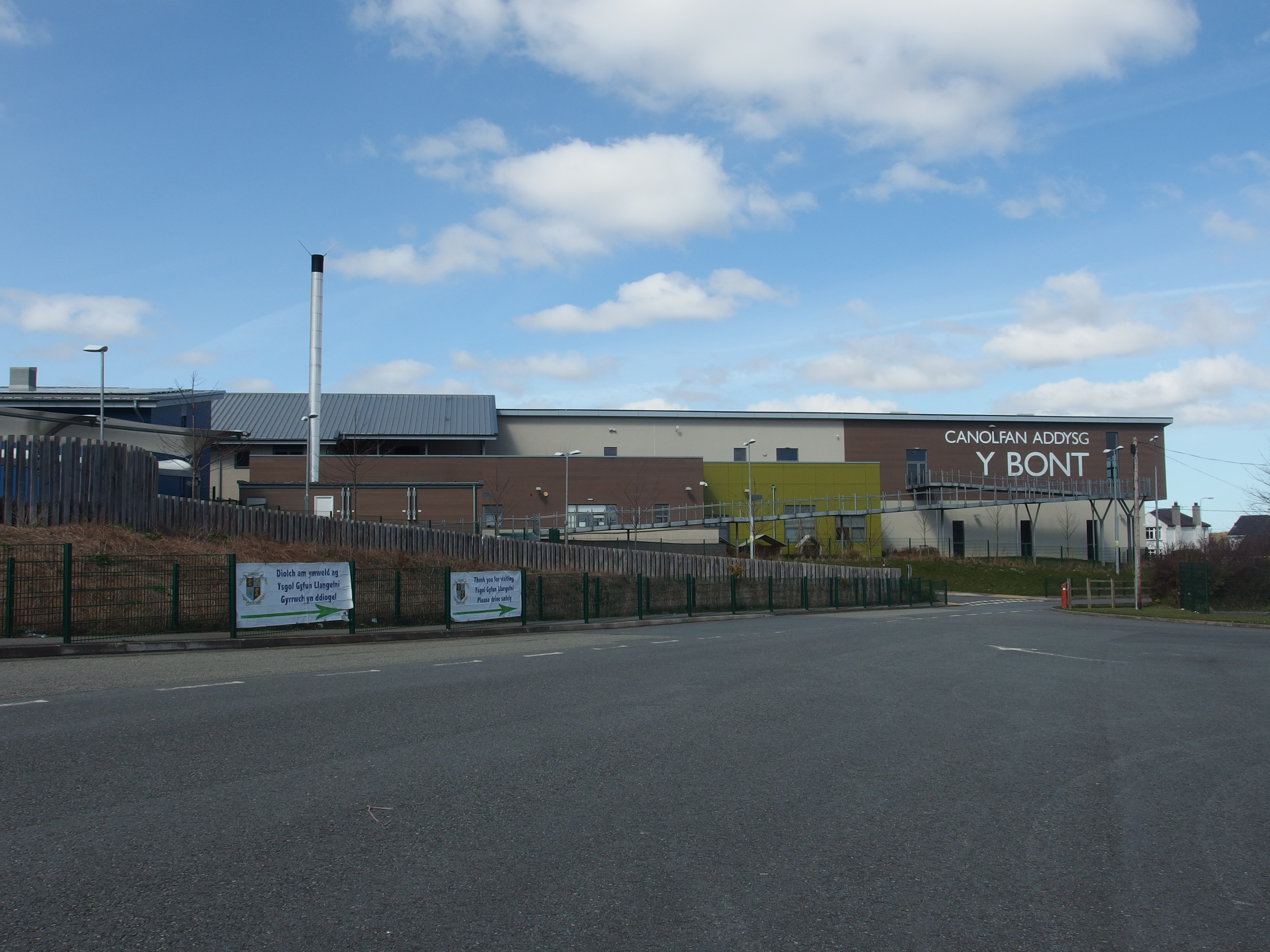
- Canolfan Addysg Y Bont in Penrallt, Llangefni

- Location within Anglesey
  - Cardiff: 131.6 mi (211.8 km)
  - London: 213.4 mi (343.4 km)
- Community: Llangefni
- Principal area: Anglesey
- Country: Wales
- Sovereign state: United Kingdom
- Post town: Llangefni
- Police: North Wales
- Fire: North Wales
- Ambulance: Welsh
- UK Parliament: Ynys Môn
- Senedd Cymru – Welsh Parliament: Ynys Môn

Penrallt is a suburb and area of Llangefni in Anglesey, Wales. It lies directly to the west of the town centre. It is home to Ysgol Gyfun Llangefni, Plas Arthur Leisure Centre and Ysgol Corn Hir.

The area is home to the Capel Cildwrn, which is an active Evangelic church. There is also the former Canolfan Penrallt, which was once part of the Coleg Menai branches of colleges and schools.

== See also ==
- List of localities in Wales by population
