= Afon Alaw (1891 ship) =

Four-masted sailing ship sunk during World War I

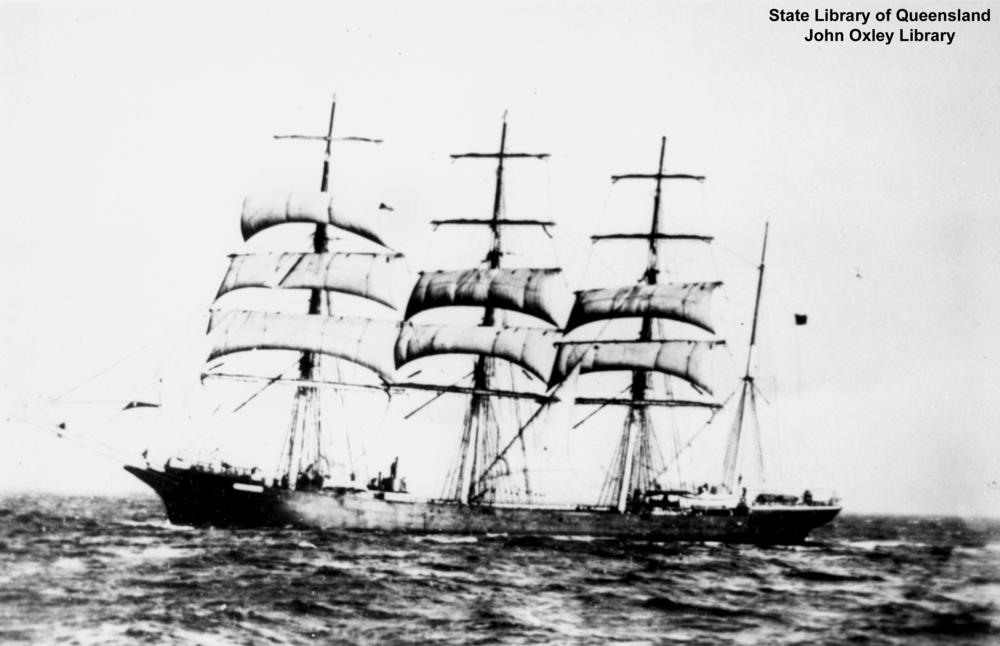
- Afon Alaw

History
- Name: Afon Alaw (1891–1915); Storebror (1915–1918)
- Owner: Hughes & Co (1891–1904); Barque Cambrian Warrior Ltd (1904–1911); County Sg Co Ltd (1911–1915); A/S Excelsior (1915–1918)
- Port of registry: Liverpool (United Kingdom); Kristiansand (Norway)
- Builder: Alexander Stephen and Sons, Glasgow, Scotland
- Yard number: 336
- Launched: 18 November 1891
- Completed: December 1891
- Fate: Sunk 4 January 1918 by SMS Wolf

General characteristics
- Type: Barque
- Tonnage: 2,052 GRT
- Length: 86.7 m (284 ft 5 in)
- Beam: 12.5 m (41 ft 0 in)
- Sail plan: Barque-rigged

Afon Alaw was a four-masted sailing ship which served from 1891 until 1918. She had a sister ship, Afon Cefni. Afon Alaw was built by Alexander Stephen and Sons at their yard in Glasgow for Hughes & Co based at Menai Bridge in Anglesey. The vessel was named for a river in Anglesey. The vessel remained in British service until 1915, moving between three owners before being sold to a Norwegian company which renamed the vessel Storebror. Norway was neutral during World War I, however the German surface raider SMS Wolf did not want its position known and sank Storebror on 4 January 1918 to prevent the Norwegian ship from disclosing it.

== Description ==
Afon Alaw was 2,052 GRT, 86.7 m (284 ft 5 in) long between perpendiculars with a beam of 12.5 m (41 ft 0 in). Powered by sails, Afon Alaw had four masts.

== Service history ==
The ship was ordered by Hughes & Co for construction by Alexander Stephen and Sons at their yard in Glasgow, Scotland with the yard number 336. The ship was named after the river of the same name (Afon Alaw) in Anglesey. Afon Alaw was launched on 18 November 1891 and completed in December. The ship was registered in Liverpool. In 1904, the ship was sold to another company from Liverpool, Barque Cambrian Warrior Ltd, and again in 1911 to County Sg Co Ltd.

In 1915, Afon Alaw was sold again to A/S Excelsior, renamed Storebror and registered in Kristiansand, Norway. On 4 January 1918 Storebror was sailing from Beira to Montevideo, Uruguay in ballast when the German raider SMS Wolf came upon the ship. The German warship did not want its position announced and sank the neutral-flagged Storebror at 17°32′S 26°50′W. This was the last ship Wolf would sink on its patrol.
