= Amser Te =

- Amser Te logo
- Starring: Myfanwy Howell
- Original language: Welsh

Production
- Producer: TWW
- Running time: 30? minutes

Original release
- Network: TWW Wales
- Release: 1958 – 1968

Amser Te is a Welsh language regional TV magazine programme produced by TWW for ten years, from 1958–1968. Amser Te means 'Tea Time' in English.

== Content ==
The format was a general interest magazine programme, which featured a regular cookery item as a tail-end, hosted by Myfanwy Howell. The first show aired in January 1958. Directed to female viewers, the show turned into "an instant hit" in Wales, according to the scholar Jamie Medhurst.

== Reception ==
Gwilym Roberts of Liverpool Daily Post praised Howell for "keeping all fidgets and fussiness from the viewer". Roberts continued, "She is outwardly calmness personified; she chats away in such a homely fashion that she could well be on an informal picnic but not before the all-seeing eyes of the cameras, and this reassuring style must be of the great possible help to her 'items,' the large majority of them without any previous television experience." The scholar Jamie Medhurst said, "The programme was a mix of studio-based and filmed items, and Howell's homely style of presenting endeared the audience to her." Many surviving recordings of the show are today kept in the archives of the National Library of Wales.
