= Malltraeth =

Village in Anglesey, Wales

Coordinates: 53.1931°N 4.3868°W

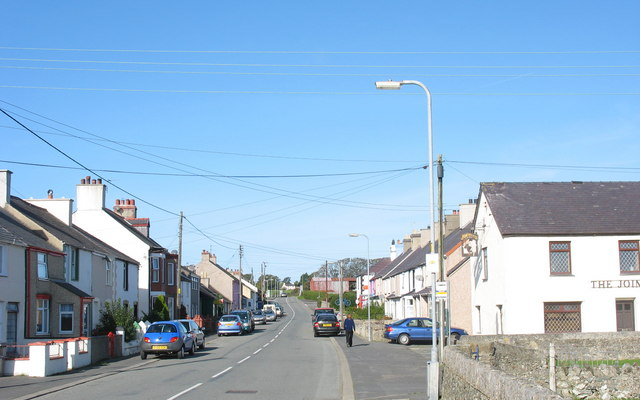
- Malltraeth main street

- Location within Anglesey
- Population: 255 (2011)
- OS grid reference: SH406688
  - Cardiff: 129 mi (208 km)
  - London: 214.2 mi (344.7 km)
- Community: Bodorgan
- Principal area: Anglesey
- Preserved county: Gwynedd
- Country: Wales
- Sovereign state: United Kingdom
- Post town: BODORGAN
- Postcode district: LL62
- Dialling code: 01407
- Police: North Wales
- Fire: North Wales
- Ambulance: Welsh
- UK Parliament: Ynys Môn
- Senedd Cymru – Welsh Parliament: Bangor Conwy Môn

Malltraeth (origin: Mall (corrupt, blasted, desolate, + Traeth (beach))) is a small village in the southwest of Anglesey, Wales, in the community of Bodorgan. It is now at the end of a large bay, which used to extend much further inland, almost creating a second sea strait in the area (the Menai Strait broke through following the end of the ice age). The population as of the 2011 census was only 255.

== History ==
After several abortive attempts, a 'cob' or dyke was built across Malltraeth Marsh during the 19th century, allowing land reclamation behind it. A road to Newborough was also built alongside the cob, allowing easier access to ferries across the Menai Strait. As a result the town grew significantly; however by the start of the 20th century the population began to decrease as people migrated to larger cities.

The village takes its name from the expanse of sand which used to exist there, some of which survives downstream of the Cob. Malltraeth means "unwholesome strand" and is recorded from at least 1304. The extent of the previous strand or beach is reflected in the names Trefdraeth ("strand farm") and Glantraeth ("strand edge"), north of Malltraeth and now far from the shore.

== Geography ==
The land remains very wet and prone to flooding, much of it of great natural and scientific importance as a result. The former salt marsh creeks are still visible on aerial photography and evident as shallow depressions in the fields. Coal mining occurred for a time in the underlying Carboniferous rock strata and the subsidence of these workings resulted in the lakes "Llynnau Gwaith-glo".

The reclaimed land is called Malltraeth Marsh, through which runs the Afon Cefni, which was canalised in 1824. The marsh is a Site of Special Scientific Interest and is particularly renowned for its bird life, beautifully captured in Charles Tunnicliffe's paintings, which form the resident gallery at Oriel Ynys Môn, near Llangefni. There is an RSPB reserve in the marsh area.

== Culture and community ==
The village had a Post Office and shop at 16 High Street, but this closed as a victim of Royal Mail making deep cuts in local post offices. A mainline railway runs just a few hundred metres north of the village, but there is no station.

In 2010 a newly constructed picnic area 'Clwt Glas' overlooking the Cefni Estuary in Malltraeth was opened. 'Clwt Glas' (Green Patch) was an area of land at the lower end of Malltraeth and was essentially the reverse side of a mound built as part of the scheme to reclaim the Cefni Marsh (Cors Ddyga) during the latter years of the 18th Century. It was transformed as a community project with the help of several grants into a picnic area, garden and information point.

Older still is the ancient standing stone found on the northern edge of the village.

== Transport ==
The nearest stations are Bodorgan, a request stop, which offers limited local journeys, along with Bangor and Holyhead, which offer more frequent access to longer distance travel to most parts of Wales, England and Scotland.

== Religious sites ==
Sardis Methodist Chapel is present in the village; the chapel was built in 1831, before being rebuilt in 1860 and renovated in 1896. A missionary chapel was also started in the village's schoolroom in 1870, and as of 2003 still held regular services.

== Notable people ==
British painter Charles Tunnicliffe moved to Malltraeth in 1947; the location allowed him to watch seabirds and wildfowl.
