= Oriel Ynys Môn =

Local museum in Llangefni, Wales

Coordinates: 53.2635°N 4.3121°W

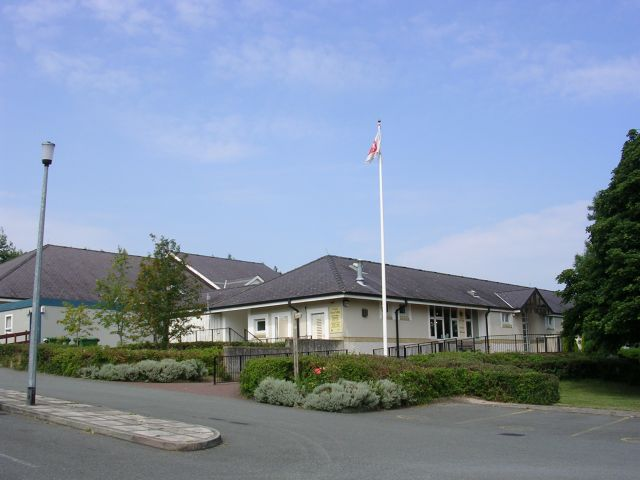
Oriel Môn

Oriel Môn is a museum and arts centre located in Llangefni, Anglesey (Ynys Môn), Wales.

A two-part centre, the History Gallery provides an insight into the island's culture, history and environment. The Art Gallery has a changing programme of exhibitions, encompassing art, craft, drama, sculpture and social history. Until November 2012, Wales's most important Iron Age find, the Celtic objects from Llyn Cerrig Bach, were loaned to the museum from the National Museum of Wales for display.

It also houses a series of permanent displays, including:

- the world's largest collection of the works of Welsh artist Sir Kyffin Williams, who was born in Llangefni. This is housed in a specialist collection named Oriel Kyffin Williams opened by Shirley Paget, Marchioness of Anglesey on 18 July 2008.
- the works of wildlife artist Charles Tunnicliffe
