= Myfanwy Howell =

British television presenter (1903–1988)

- Myfanwy Howell
- Born: 1 September 1903; Llangefni, Anglesey
- Died: 14 November 1988 (aged 85); Newport
- Occupation: Broadcaster

Myfanwy Howell (1 September 1903 – 14 November 1988) was an early Welsh language radio and television broadcaster, host of Amser Te (Tea Time) in the 1950s.

== Early life ==
Howell was from Llangefni, Anglesey. She was related to poet Denise Levertov's mother, Beatrice Spooner-Jones Levertoff. Scientist John Charnley remembered knowing Myfanwy Howell in Anglesey when he was a teenager evacuated to the island during World War II.

== Career ==
=== Broadcasting ===
In the early 1940s, during World War II, Howell was on radio with the BBC Home Service, contributing Welsh-language content on diet and for schoolchildren.

In the 1950s Howell was a program assistant in early radio and television productions based in Bangor, including Noson Lawen (A Merry Evening). In 1952 and 1954 she gave the "shopping report" on the BBC radio program Woman's Hour. In 1952, she gave a recipe for Aberffrauw cakes (a shortbread variety associated with Anglesey) on Welsh Diary on the BBC's General Overseas Service, when Welsh speakers abroad requested recipes on the program. In 1954, she hosted a special Welsh-themed edition of the BBC television program Leisure and Pleasure. She appeared in a 1958 trial weekly series, Awyr Iach (Open Air) with Ron Saunders.

Howell became well known as the presenter on the TWW programme Amser Te (Tea Time), the network's long-running weekly Welsh-language afternoon program for women viewers, beginning in 1958. The show featured recipes, interviews, competitions, musical guests, live and filmed segments; "Howell's homely style of presenting endeared the audience to her." The program's baking segments were popular enough to publish Tea Time Recipes, a cookbook of the recipes featured on the show in 1962, and a sequel, Tea Time Round the World.

=== Other activities ===
Howell was also a justice of the peace. In 1949 she became the first chair of the Welsh Counties Committee of the Women's Institute. In 1954 she participated in the opening ceremonies of the National Eisteddfod, on behalf of the Women's Institute.

== Personal life ==
Myfanwy Howell's husband was Illtyd Howell. They lived in Newport. Some of their letters are in the Denise Levertov Papers at Stanford University.
