= Pencraig, Anglesey =

Coordinates: 53.256557°N 4.298938°W

Pencraig
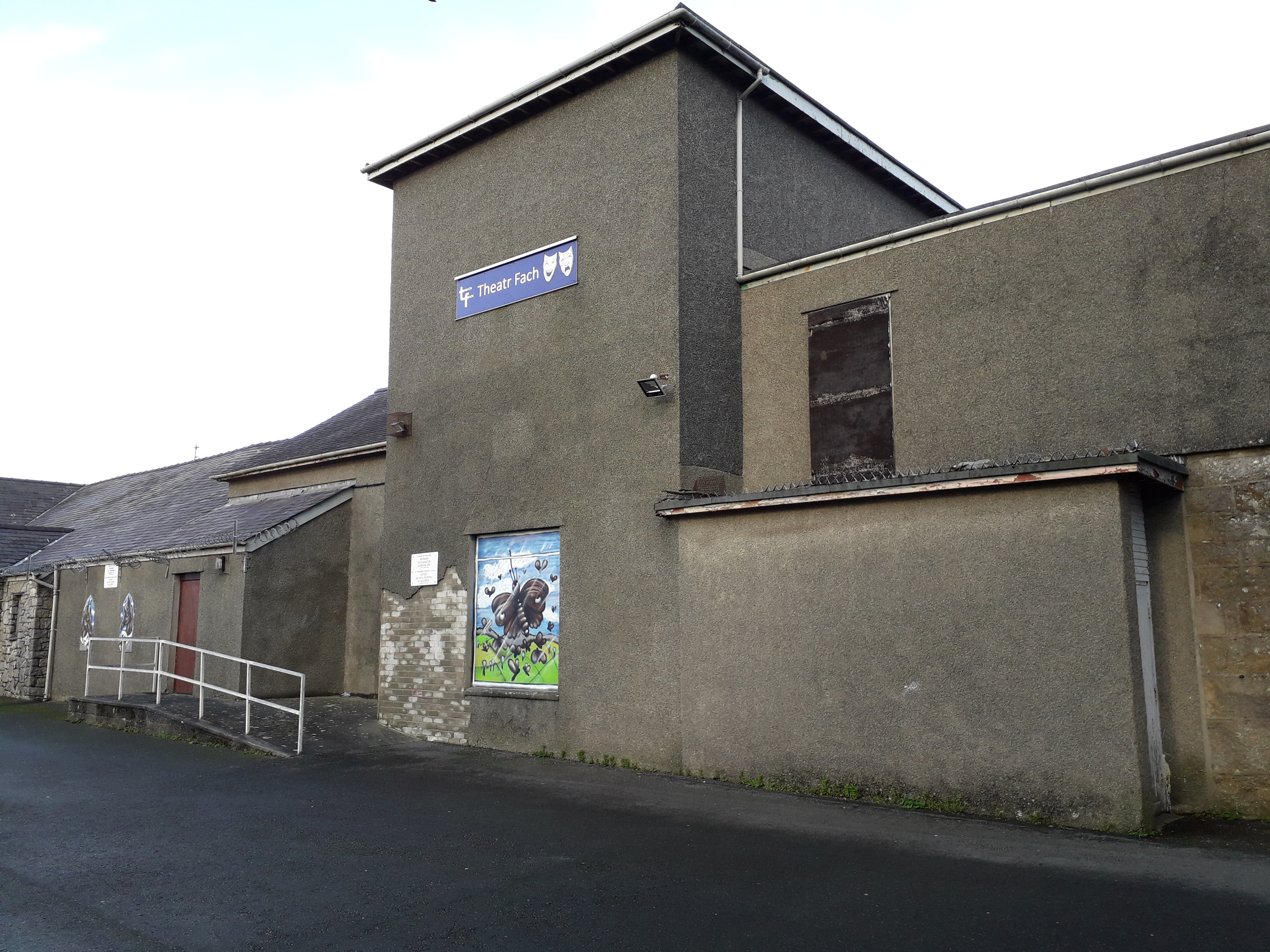

- Location within Anglesey
- OS grid reference: SH 4674 7575
  - Cardiff: 131.6 mi (211.8 km)
  - London: 213.4 mi (343.4 km)
- Community: Llangefni
- Principal area: Anglesey
- Country: Wales
- Sovereign state: United Kingdom
- Post town: Llangefni
- Police: North Wales
- Fire: North Wales
- Ambulance: Welsh
- UK Parliament: Ynys Môn
- Senedd Cymru – Welsh Parliament: Ynys Môn

Pencraig is a suburb and area of Llangefni in Anglesey, Wales. It is home to the Theatr Fach Llangefni.

== See also ==
- List of localities in Wales by population
