= Kyffin Williams =

Welsh painter (1918–2006)

Sir Kyffin Williams OBE, RA
- Born: John Kyffin Williams; 9 May 1918; Llangefni, Anglesey, Wales
- Died: 1 September 2006 (aged 88); Llanfairpwllgwyngyll, Anglesey, Wales
- Known for: Landscapes
- Awards: RA (1974), OBE (1982), Knight Bachelor (1999)

Sir John Kyffin Williams, OBE, RA (9 May 1918 – 1 September 2006) was a Welsh landscape painter who lived at Pwllfanogl, Llanfairpwll, on the Island of Anglesey. Williams is widely regarded as the defining artist of Wales during the 20th century.

== Personal life ==
Williams was born in Llangefni, Anglesey, one of two sons into an old landed Anglesey family. His father was a bank manager. Williams wrote that his mother was an emotionally repressed woman who had a virulent dislike of the Welsh and the Welsh language. Kyffin Williams was educated at Moreton Hall School, Trearddur House School in Anglesey, then at Shrewsbury School where he contracted polio encephalitis which led him to develop epilepsy, a misfortune he later described as "my greatest fortune". He joined the 6th Battalion Royal Welch Fusiliers as a lieutenant in 1937. After he failed a British Army medical examination in 1941 (because of epilepsy), the examining doctor suggested he pursue his interest in art.

Williams enrolled at London's Slade School of Fine Art in 1941 (relocated to Oxford during the war), gaining prizes for portraiture at the end of both his second and third years. He then achieved his ambition to teach art by accepting a position at Highgate School, London, where he was senior art master from 1944 until 1973. His pupils included the historian Sir Martin Gilbert, Royal Academicians Anthony Green and Patrick Procktor and composers John Tavener and John Rutter. He painted a portrait of the school's cricket coach, former test player Albert Knight. Wales never left his consciousness or imagination, as he would return home in holidays, take his study sketches back to London and complete his canvasses. Williams' particular technique was applying thick oil paint with a palette knife. Williams was predominately a landscape painter but he also was an accomplished portraitist and something of a cartoonist.

In 1968 he won a Winston Churchill Fellowship to study and paint in Y Wladfa, the Welsh settlement in Patagonia, South America. This added a significant body of work to his oeuvre (nearly 50 Patagonia paintings) and the light in Patagonia radically changed his palette.

On retiring from Highgate school Williams returned to Anglesey and spent the next 30 years painting, and promoting Welsh schools of Art and Welsh art in general.

Never having married, Williams died, without heirs, on 1 September 2006, aged 88, at St Tysilio Nursing Home on Anglesey. He had been at the home on the outskirts of Llanfairpwll for just over a week after spending two weeks as a patient at Ysbyty Gwynedd, Bangor. He had been suffering from prostate and from lung cancer, believed to be a result of working with lead-based paints. Williams was buried at St Mary's Church, Llanfair-yng-Nghornwy. Paying tribute to Williams after his death, bass-baritone singer and Williams collector Bryn Terfel said, "I'm deeply saddened by the passing of Wales's foremost ambassador in the visual arts. Long may his memory live on in the legacy of his numerous, wonderful paintings."

In 1949 Williams had his first one-man-show at a private gallery in London. His first Patagonia exhibition took place in 1971. Later in 2006, the Welsh singer and Manic Street Preachers frontman James Dean Bradfield included a track called "Which Way to Kyffin", dedicated to Williams, on his album The Great Western.

== As an artist ==
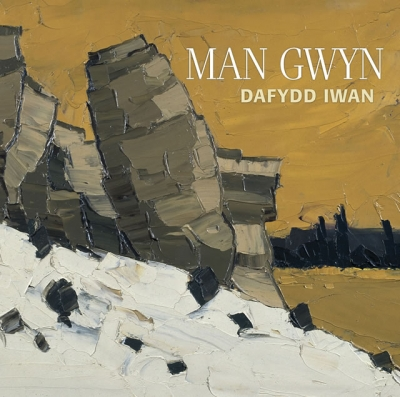
Dafydd Iwan album cover based on Williams' painting Lle Cul, Patagonia (1968)

His works typically drew inspiration from the Welsh landscape and farmlands. His works may be seen in a permanent exhibition in the Oriel Kyffin Williams Gallery which opened in 2008 at Oriel Ynys Môn in Llangefni, Anglesey, as well as at many other galleries elsewhere in Britain. He was president of the Royal Cambrian Academy and was appointed a member of the Royal Academy in 1974.

In 1995 Williams received the Glyndŵr Award for an Outstanding Contribution to the Arts in Wales during the Machynlleth Festival. He was awarded the OBE for his services to the arts in 1982 and was knighted in 1999.

The Kyffin Williams Drawing Prize was established in 2009. The winning works from the 2018 prize are due to be exhibited at the Oriel Kyffin Williams Gallery.

In February 2011 it was announced that Williams' paintings of Patagonia would be shown for the first time. His last passport, on show in the Oriel Ynys Môn gallery at Llangefni, 2004–2014, has the name Sir John Williams. Kyffin was his grandmother's maiden name.

Williams was a great raconteur and also a fine writer, publishing his autobiography in "Across the Straits" and "A wider sky".

The National Library of Wales was one of the first national institutions to purchase one of his pictures in the late forties and continued to buy his works thereafter. In acknowledgement of their support he bequeathed many of his papers and a large body of his pictures to the library, which now holds probably the largest single body of his work. Examples of Williams' works are held in other public collections, including the Government Art Collection, the Arts Council Collection and the National Museum of Wales.

Williams was a friend of sculptor Ivor Roberts-Jones and is said to have stood in as the model for the latter's statue of Winston Churchill (commissioned 1971) now in Parliament Square, London.

== Legacy ==
Williams' work is in the collections of a number of Welsh museums and galleries, but particularly at the Oriel Môn gallery in Rhosmeirch, Llangefni on Anglesey.

In June 2018, he was the subject of a 50-minute BBC Television documentary, Kyffin Williams: The Man Who Painted Wales, presented by Josie d'Arby.

Williams' former home, "Min y Môr", a Grade II listed cottage overlooking the Menai Strait, is now rented out for holidays.

== Bibliography ==
- Meic Stephens (Editor): The New Companion to the Literature of Wales (University of Wales Press, Cardiff, 1998) ISBN 0-7083-1383-3
