= Afon Cefni (1892 ship) =

History
- Name: Afon Cefni
- Owner: Hughes & Co.
- Port of registry: (United Kingdom of Great Britain and Ireland) Liverpool
- Builder: A. Stephens & Sons for Hughes & Co, Glasgow, Scotland
- Yard number: 339
- Launched: 10 March 1892
- Completed: April 1892
- Fate: Wrecked 1894

General characteristics
- Type: Barque
- Tonnage: 2,066 GRT
- Length: 87.0 m (285 ft 5 in) pp
- Beam: 12.5 m (41 ft 0 in)

Afon Cefni was an iron, four-masted barque. She was named after Afon Cefni, one of the rivers of Anglesey. Her sister ship was Afon Alaw, also named after an Anglesey river. Like Afon Alaw, Afon Cefni was built in Glasgow, Scotland by A. Stephens & Sons for Hughes & Co from Menai Bridge, Anglesey.

The ship's career, however, was not long. In January 1894 it was en route to San Francisco from Swansea when it was lost with all crew. Later, pieces of the ship washed up on the Cornish and Sussex coasts.

== Description ==
Afon Cefni was a four-masted barque of 2,066 gross register tons (GRT). The vessel measured 87.0 metres (285 ft 5 in) long between perpendiculars with a beam of 12.5 metres (41 ft 0 in). A newspaper account from the period states the ship as having been measured at 1,996 gross register tons (GRT) with a capacity for 3,330 long tons (3,380 t) of cargo. On Afon Cefni's final voyage, the ship had a draught of 0.8 metres (2 ft 6 in).

== Service history ==
The barque was constructed by A. Stephens & Sons at their yard in Glasgow, Scotland on behalf of Hughes & Co with the yard number 339. The vessel was launched on 10 March 1892 and completed in April of that year. The ship was registered in Liverpool. Named Afon Cefni for the river in Anglesey, the barque had a short career.

On 5 January 1894, Afon Cefni departed Swansea, Wales for San Francisco, California. The vessel was last seen off Lundy and was not heard from again. From 20 January to 5 February pieces of wreckage from the ship were collected along the Cornish and Sussex coasts. The identity of the wreckage was ascertained when a lifebuoy bearing Afon Cefni's name washed up on the Sussex coast.
