= Llangefni =

County town of Anglesey, Wales

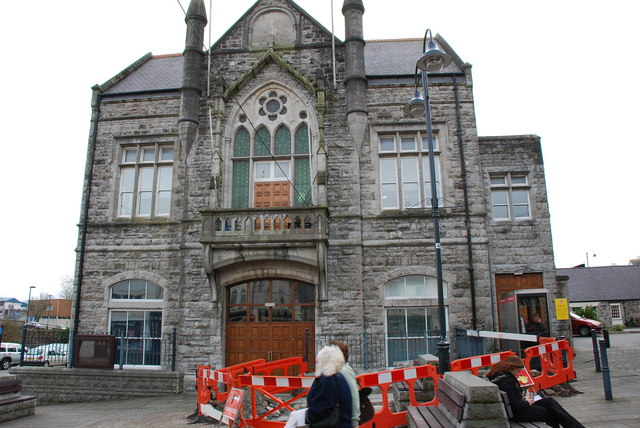
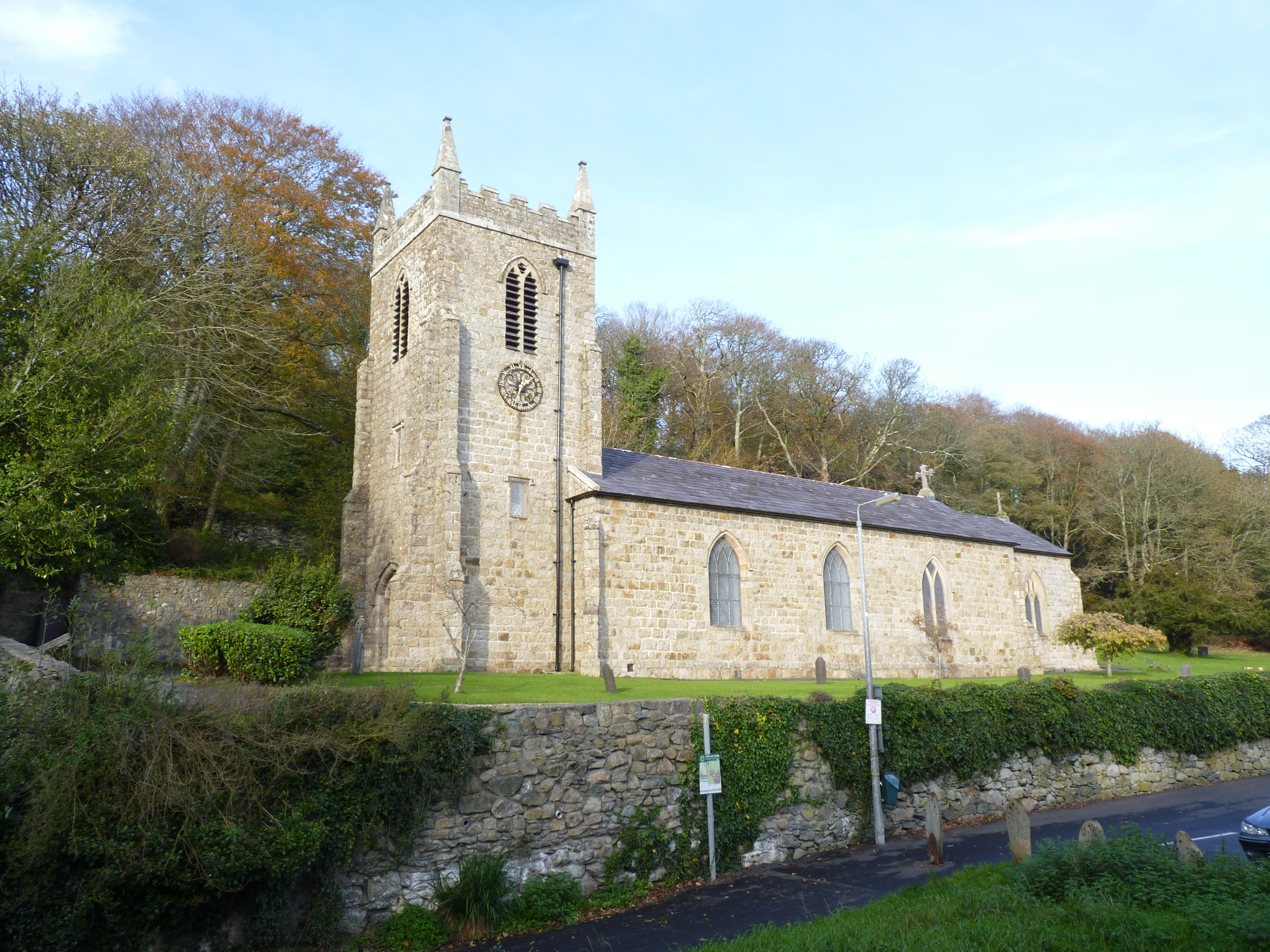
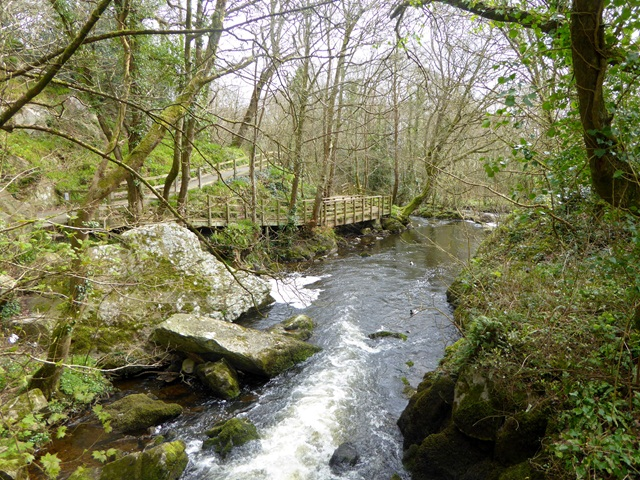
- From the top: Llangefni Town Hall, St Cyngar's Church and The Dingle

- Location within Anglesey
- Population: 5,116 2011 Census
- OS grid reference: SH4675
- Principal area: Anglesey
- Preserved county: Gwynedd
- Country: Wales
- Sovereign state: United Kingdom
- Areas of the town: List: Pencraig; Penrallt; Rhosmeirch (village); Rhostrehwfa (village)
- Post town: Llangefni
- Postcode district: LL77
- Dialling code: 01248
- Police: North Wales
- Fire: North Wales
- Ambulance: Welsh
- UK Parliament: Ynys Môn
- Senedd Cymru – Welsh Parliament: Bangor Conwy Môn
- List of places UK Wales Anglesey 53.256°N 4.314°W Map of the community

Llangefni (Welsh for 'church on the river Cefni'; Welsh pronunciation: [ɬaŋˈɡɛvni]) is the county town of Anglesey in Wales. At the 2011 census, Llangefni's population was 5,116, making it the second-largest town in the county and the largest on the island. The population of the town at the 2021 Census for the built up area was 5,561 residents. While the surrounding community was 5,795 residents.

== Location ==
The town is near the centre of Anglesey, and is on the River Cefni, after which it is named. Its attractions include the Oriel Ynys Môn museum, which details the history of Anglesey and houses collections of the painters Kyffin Williams and Charles Tunnicliffe. In the west of the town is a large secondary school, Ysgol Gyfun Llangefni (Llangefni Comprehensive School), and in the north a Victorian parish church, St Cyngar's, set in a wooded riverside location called the Dingle. The town was formerly named Llangyngar, Welsh for "St Cyngar's church".

== History ==
=== Establishment ===
National Eisteddfod of Wales 1957

The town of Llangefni, located at the geographic heart of Anglesey, Wales, has a long history that evolved from an ancient, isolated church enclosure into the thriving administrative and commercial capital of the island.

In the Middle Ages, it was part of the commote of Menai in the can tref (hundred) of Aberffraw.

Its name translates directly as "Church on the River Cefni"; it grew from a small hamlet around St Cyngar's Church and developed as an organised market centre with origins dating back to the 13th century. The town's history begins in the 5th and 6th centuries around the historic church site. Established in a wooded valley alongside the River Cefni (now known as The Dingle), this early Christian settlement gave the town its original name, Llangyngar. In 1750, the first Baptist meeting place on Anglesey was founded in the town as a small cottage (Tŷ Cildwrn), paving the way for the grander Capel Cildwrn built in 1781, establishing Llangefni as a centre for religious nonconformity. On 30 September 1785, the town hosted the first Llangefni Market. It grew rapidly to become the largest livestock and cattle market on Anglesey, a key venue for the island's farmers. Between 1828 and 1833, the prominent Melin y Graig (Craig Mill) windmill was erected on a rocky crag, and in 1824, the parish church of St Cyngar was completely rebuilt in its spacious, modern layout. In 1864, the Anglesey Central Railway opened its line through Llangefni, which allowed the seamless transport of livestock, wool, and leather goods to the rest of the UK. Llangefni became the official administrative headquarters for the Anglesey County Council in 1899.

The town centre clock was built at the expense of the friends and relations of Lieutenant George Pritchard-Rayner, one of the island's major landowners, who lived at Tre Ysgawen but died in the Boer War.

The clock tower was built in 1902–03 of limestone from Traeth Bychan near Marian-Glas on the eastern coast of the island. In the 1880s the town hall had been built of the same material; it was opened on 10 March 1884.

== Commerce and education ==
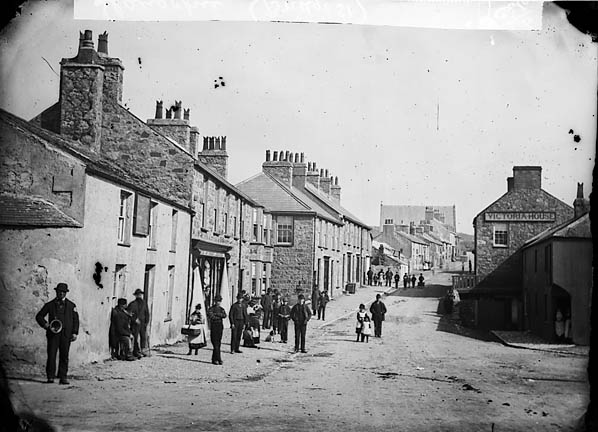
Bridge street, Llangefni circa 1875

Llangefni is a commercial and farming town in Anglesey and once hosted the largest cattle market on the island. There is a relatively large industrial estate, which included a large chicken processing plant, the largest single industrial operation in the town, until March 2023, when it closed with the loss of 700 jobs. Several other smaller businesses remain.

Llangefni is home to the headquarters of a large builders' merchant chain Huws Gray. The company currently has over 100 branches across the UK.

Llangefni hosted the National Eisteddfod in 1957 and 1983, and in 1999 gave its name to the Eisteddfod held at the nearby village of Llanbedrgoch. It also hosted the Urdd Eisteddfod (youth Eisteddfod) in 2004. The town also has a college, Coleg Menai (Llangefni site).

== Transport ==
=== Road ===
There are frequent buses to the larger settlements of Bangor and Holyhead as well as to the smaller towns of Amlwch and Beaumaris. By road, the town is just 2 kilometres from the major A55 and A5 roads, via the short A5114. Water for the town comes from Llyn Cefni, a reservoir 1.5 miles (2.4 km) to the northwest.

=== Railways ===
The town was served by the Llangefni railway station on the Anglesey Central Railway line from Gaerwen to Amlwch, which opened in 1864. The station was served by a handsome two-storey station building located on the up side of the track as well as a small waggon shed and larger goods yard. The station closed in 1964, although goods trains continued to pass through the town until 1993. Since then, there have been proposals to convert the line into a multi-purpose path at a cost estimated at £10 million pounds. Although no longer usable, the railway tracks have not been removed. The route remains under the control of Network Rail, leased to Anglesey Central Railway (2006) Ltd, which hopes to raise some £150 million to reinstate a working railway. Hybrid plans also exist for a cycle route along 16 miles (26 km) of the line (the majority of its length), which would also allow the route to be used for a heritage railway. In November 2009, the Welsh Assembly asked Network Rail to conduct a feasibility study on reopening the line between Llangefni and Bangor for passenger services. Network Rail assessed the track bed and published its report in 2010, although a business case to reopen the line is yet to be developed. The nearest station is now at Llanfairpwllgwyngyll, 5 miles (8 km) away as the crow flies.

== Demographics ==
According to the 2021 Census, the community of Llangefni was recorded at 5,795 residents. The ethnic make up of the local population was recorded at 98% White British, 0.7% Asian British, 0.7% Mixed Race and 0.2% Black British. The religious makeup of the community was 54.2% Christian, 43.9% No Religion, 1.4% Muslim and other religions made up the rest of the composition.

== Sport ==
The local association football club, Llangefni Town, was promoted to the Welsh Premier League at the end of the 2006–07 season, but was relegated one season later.

The local rugby club is Llangefni RFC, which plays in the WRU leagues. The club recently gained promotion to Division 2 West, but the WRU then decided to demote the club back to Division 4 North Wales league.

== Welsh language skills ==
According to the 2011 Census, Llangefni is the community with the highest percentage of Welsh speakers on the Isle of Anglesey, and the 6th highest in Wales. 80.7% of residents aged three and over reported being able to speak Welsh in the 2011 Census, as compared to 83.8% reporting being able to do so in the 2001 Census. 91.6% of those born in Wales could speak Welsh.

== Governance ==
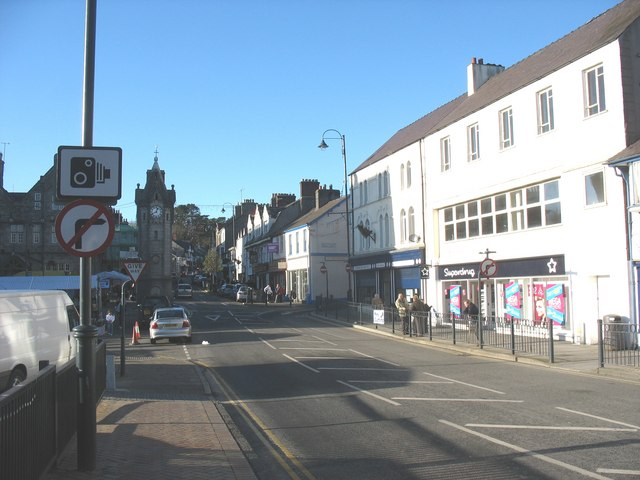
Town centre

There are two tiers of local government covering Llangefni, at community (town) and county level: Llangefni Town Council and Isle of Anglesey County Council. The town council is based at the former courthouse on Glanhwfa Road.

In parliamentary elections, Llangefni has been within of the county constituency of Ynys Môn since the latter's creation (as "Anglesey") by the Laws in Wales Act 1535, except between the Parliamentary Boundaries Act 1832 and the Redistribution of Seats Act 1885, when it was a contributory borough to the existing parliamentary borough of Beaumaris.

=== Administrative history ===
Llangefni was an ancient parish. In 1890 the parish was made a local government district, administered by an elected local board. Such local government districts were reconstituted as urban districts under the Local Government Act 1894.

Llangefni Urban District was abolished in 1974, with its area instead becoming a community. District-level functions passed to Ynys Môn-Isle of Anglesey Borough Council, which in 1996 was reconstituted as a county council.

The original Anglesey County Council was based at Llangefni Shire Hall from 1899 until 1974. The shire hall was re-designated the "Borough Council Offices" in 1974 and became the headquarters of Ynys Môn-Isle of Anglesey Borough Council. New council offices were built on Mill Street (Welsh: Lon-y-Felin) in Llangefni in the late 1990s for the new Isle of Anglesey County Council.

== Notable people ==
- John Elias (1774–1841), preacher, lived in the town 1830–41
- Christmas Evans (1766–1838), preacher and chapel builder, lived in the town 1791–1826
- Gabriel Fielding (1916–1986), author, attended Llangefni County School, in 1934
- Huw Garmon (born 1966), a Welsh actor
- Nathan Gill (born 1973), politician, former Leader of Reform UK Wales; lives in Llangefni
- Hugh Griffith (1912–1980), Oscar‑winning actor, attended Llangefni County School in his youth
- Hywel Gwynfryn (born 1942), television and radio personality, studied at Ysgol Gyfun Llangefni
- Myfanwy Howell (1903–1988), Welsh language radio and television broadcaster
- Naomi Watts (born 1968), Oscar‑nominated actress, lived in the town between the ages of 7 and 10
- Kyffin Williams (1918–2006), Welsh landscape painter
