= St Cyngar's Church, Llangefni =

Church in Anglesey, Wales

Coordinates: 53°15′28″N 4°18′47″W

St Cyngar's Church
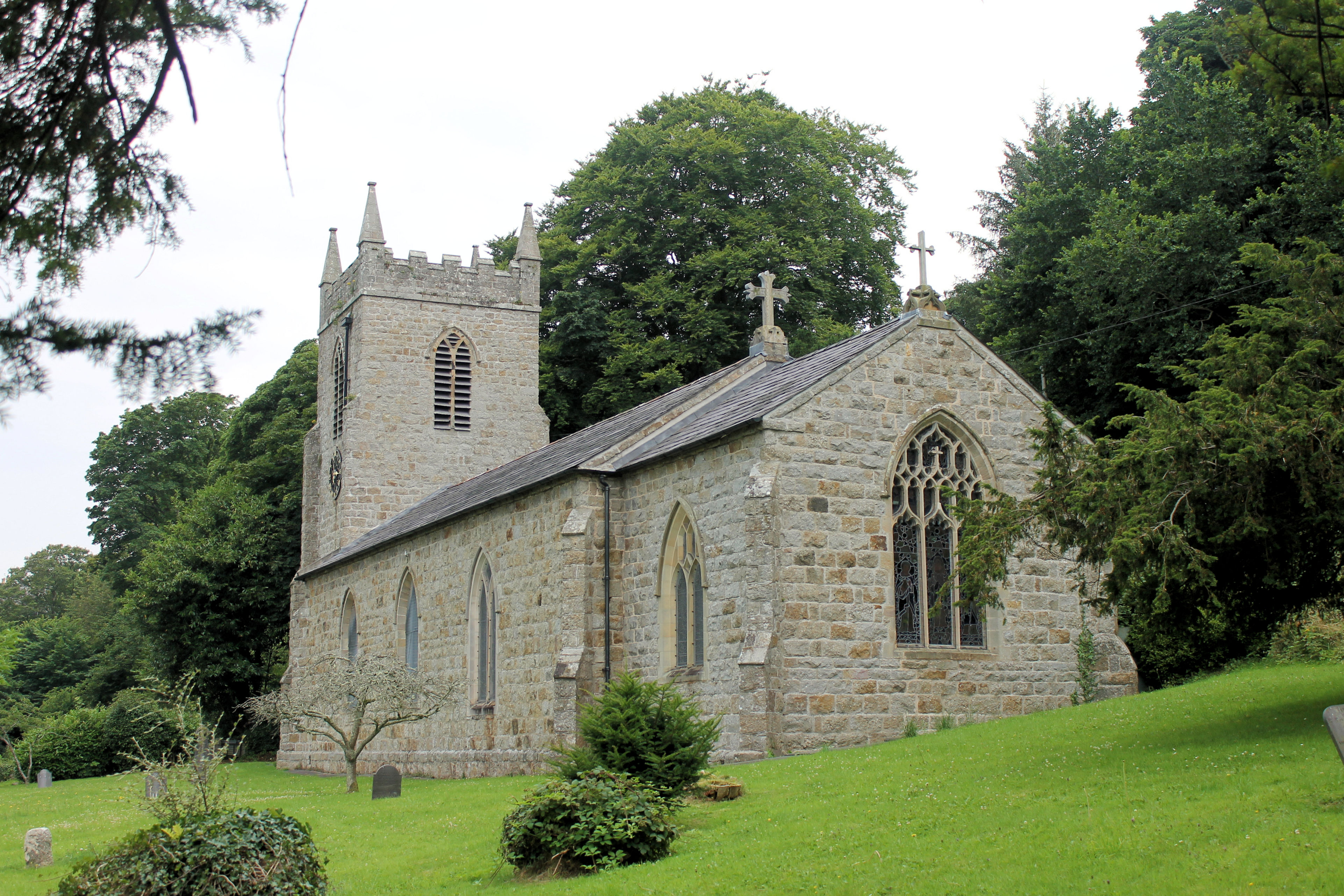
- St Cyngar's Church
- Country: Wales
- Denomination: Church in Wales

Architecture
- Heritage designation: Grade II
- Designated: 8 July 1952
- Architectural type: Church
- Style: Medieval

St Cyngar's Church is a church in the town of Llangefni in Anglesey, Wales. The building dates from 1824. It was designated a Grade II listed building on 8 July 1952.
