= LNWR 5ft 6in Tank Class =

LNWR 5ft 6in Tank class
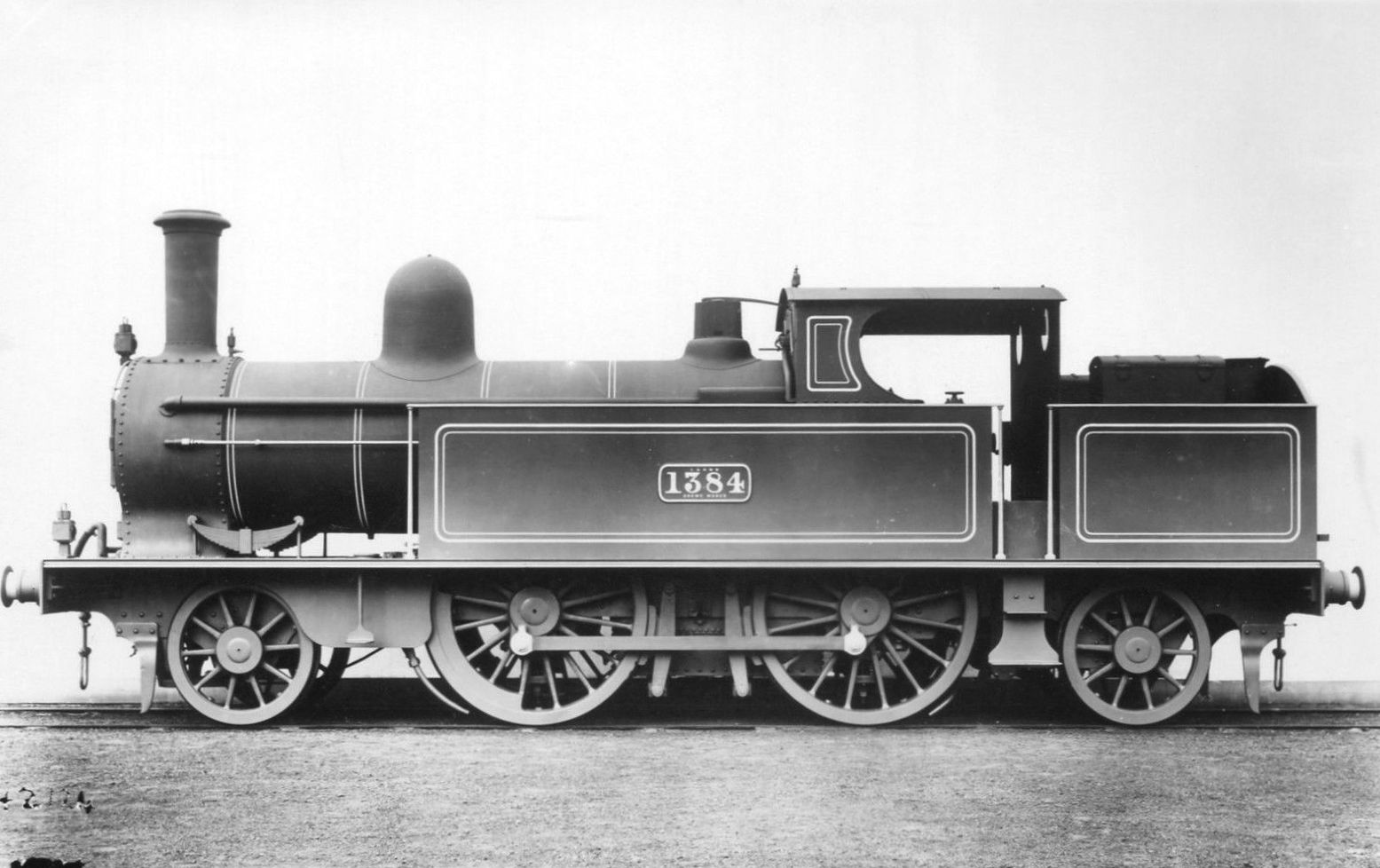
- No. 1384 As built, photographic grey livery
Type and origin
- Power type: Steam
- Designer: F. W. Webb
- Builder: Crewe Works
- Serial number: 3152–3171, 3222–3241, 3252–3261, 3385–3434, 3480–3489, 3495–3504, 3511–3530, 3757–3776
- Build date: Sept 1890 – July 1897
- Total produced: 160
Specifications
- Configuration
  - Whyte: 2-4-2T
  - UIC: 1′B1′ n2t
- Gauge: 4 ft 8 1/2 in (1,435 mm)
- Leading dia.: 3 ft 9 in (1.143 m)
- Driver dia.: 5 ft 8 1/2 in (1,740 mm)
- Trailing dia.: 3 ft 9 in (1.143 m)
- Wheelbase
  - Leading: 7 ft 5 in (2.26 m)
  - Drivers: 8 ft 3 in (2.51 m)
  - Trailing: 6 ft 9 in (2.06 m)
- Loco weight: 51 long tons (52 t)
- Fuel type: Coal
- Boiler pressure: 150 lbf/in^{2} (1.03 MPa)
- Heating surface: 1,074.6 sq ft (99.83 m^{2})
- Cylinders: Two, inside
- Cylinder size: 17 in × 24 in (432 mm × 610 mm)
- Valve gear: Allan valve gear
Career
- Operators: London and North Western Railway; London, Midland and Scottish Railway; British Railways; Longmoor Military Railway
- Power class: LMS: 1P
- Withdrawn: 1907–1955
- Disposition: All scrapped

The LNWR 5ft 6in Tank was a class of 160 passenger 2-4-2T locomotives manufactured by the London and North Western Railway in their Crewe Works between 1890 and 1897. The "5ft 6in" in the title referred to the diameter of the driving wheels – although the stated dimension was for the wheel centres – the nominal diameter including the tyres was 5 ft 8 1/2 in (1,740 mm).

== Design ==
The design featured a 150 lbf/in^{2} (1.03 MPa) saturated boiler and two 17 by 24 inches (430 by 610 mm) cylinders connected by Allan valve gear to the driving wheels.

They were effectively a tank version of the LNWR Webb Precursor Class, which were then being withdrawn.

== Service ==
Three locomotives were withdrawn before the 1923 Grouping; the remaining 157 locomotive passed to the London, Midland and Scottish Railway who renumbered them 6600–6757, and gave them power classification 1P.

Forty-two locomotives were fitted up between 1929 and 1932 by the LMS for push-pull train service.

Two were sold to the War Department in 1930 and 1931; they served on the Longmoor Military Railway where they became LMR 22 Earl Haig and LMR 23 Earl Roberts. No. 22 was scrapped circa 1939, No. 23 lasted long enough to be renumbered WD 206, but was scrapped during the war.

Forty-three survived to British Railways service in 1948; their numbers were increased by 40000. The last of the class was withdrawn in September 1955 and none were preserved.

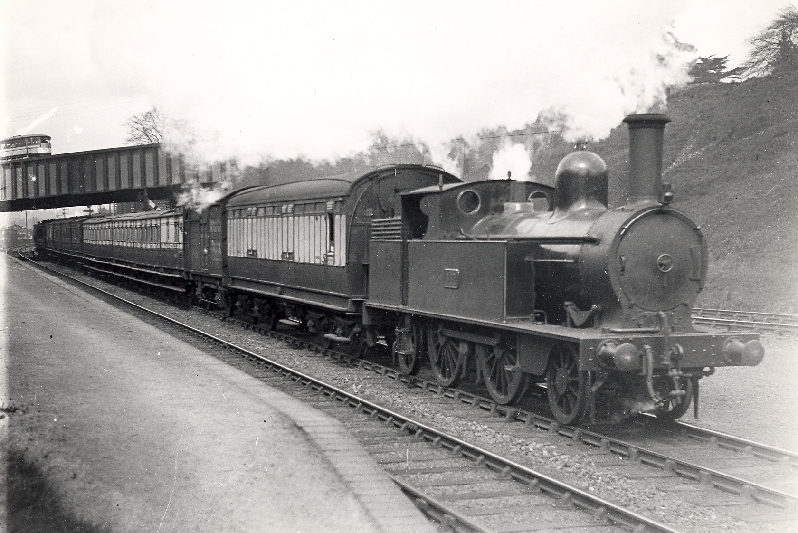
LNWR era shot, posed for the camera

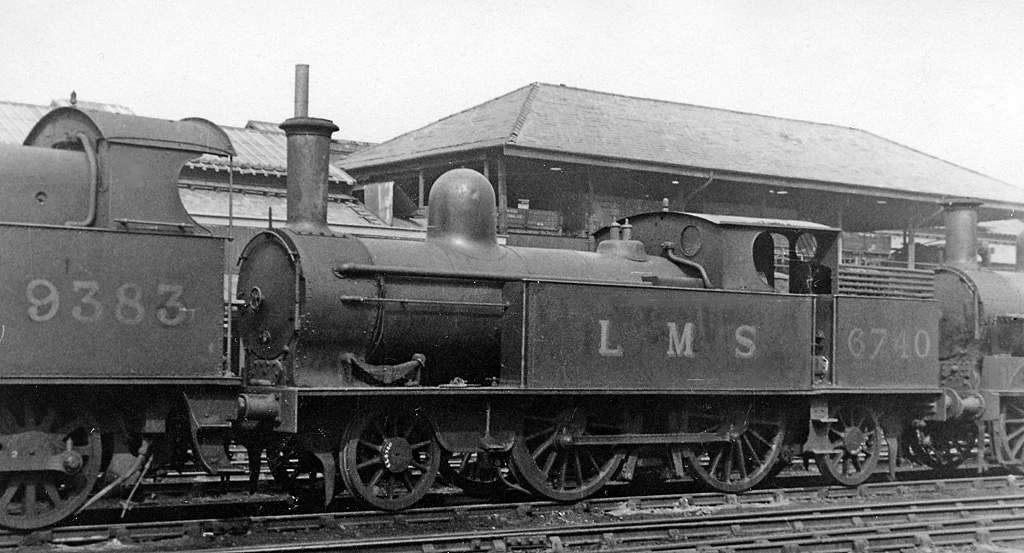
LMS Livery

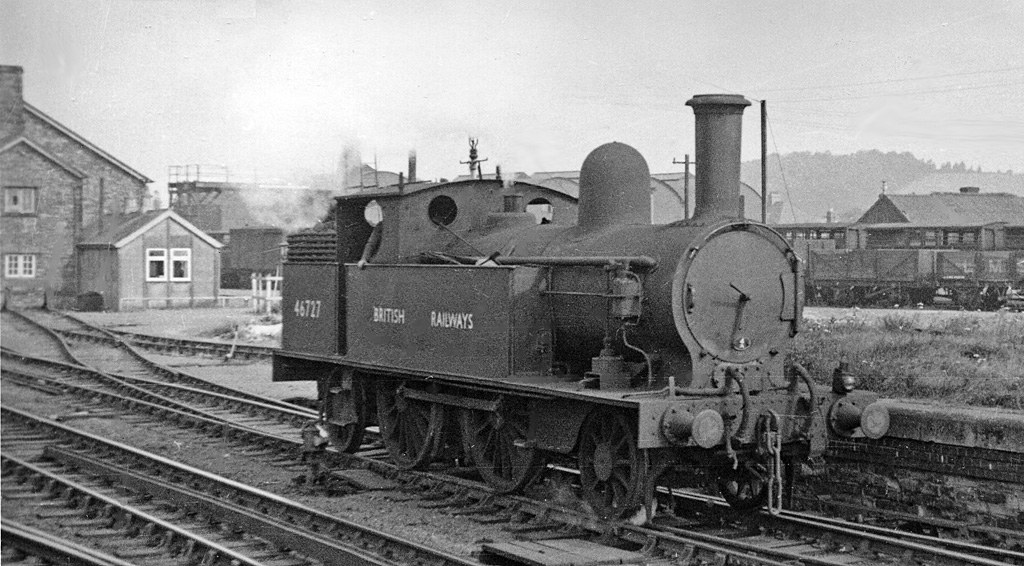
Early BR livery with "BRITISH RAILWAYS" lettering

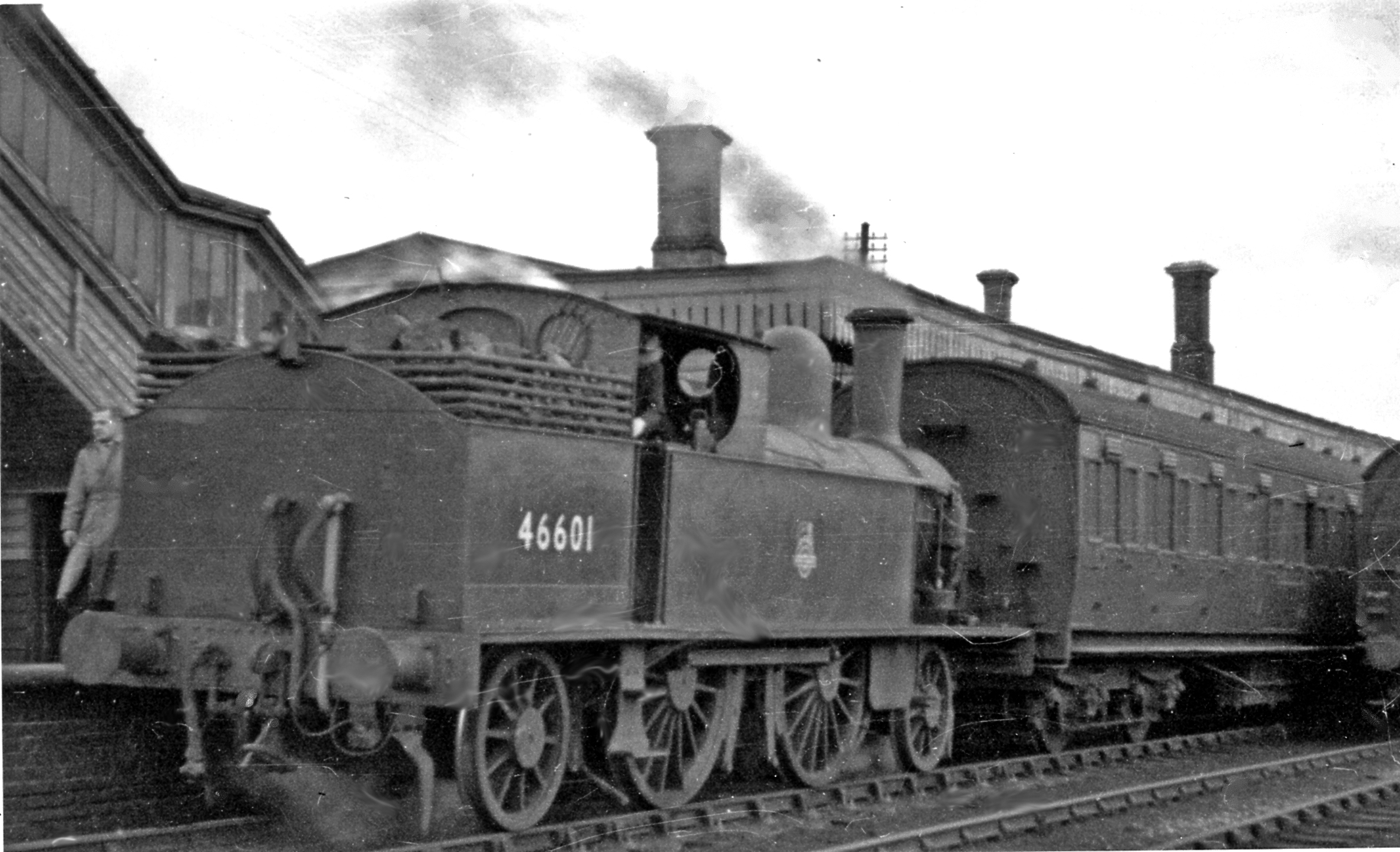
BR livery
