= Llyn Alaw =

Reservoir in Anglesey, Wales

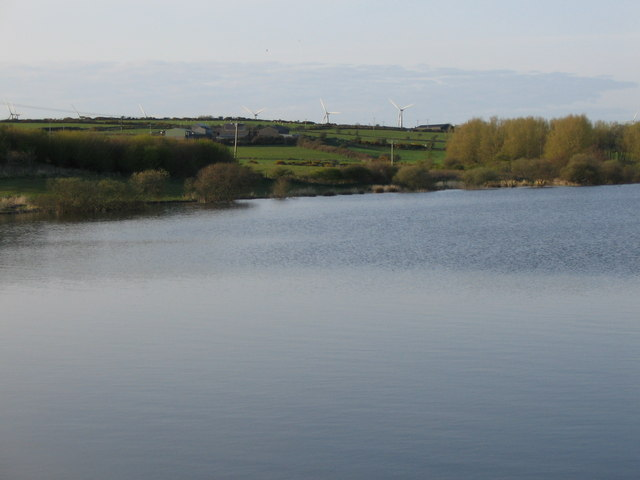

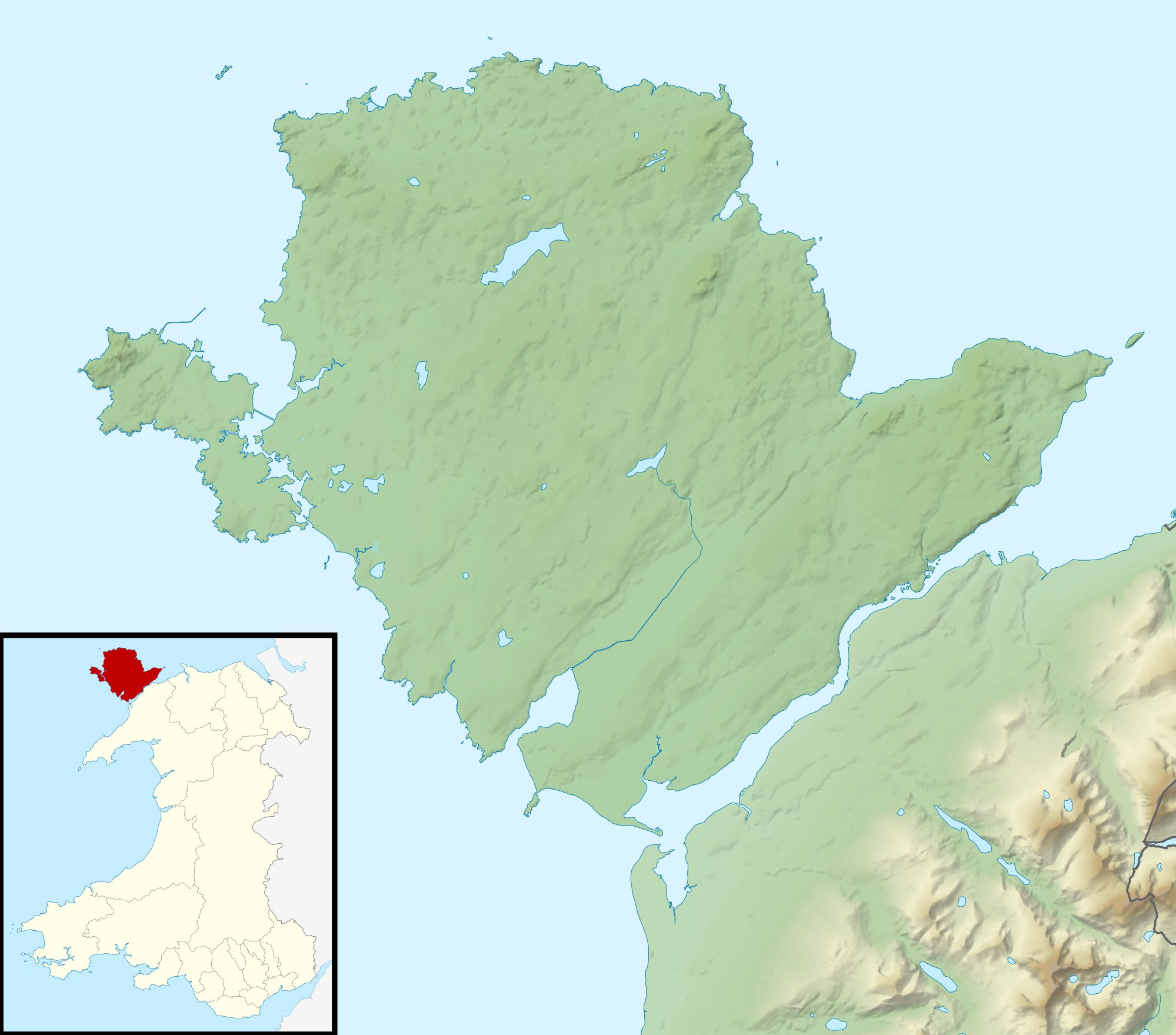
- Location within Anglesey
- Location: Anglesey, North Wales
- Coordinates: 53°21′10″N 4°24′50″W
- Type: Reservoir
- Basin countries: United Kingdom
- Max. length: 4.3 km (2.7 mi)
- Surface area: 3.6 km^{2} (1.4 sq mi)
- Max. depth: 5.2 m (17 ft)
- Water volume: 1,640×10^{6} imp gal (7.5 GL; 6,000 acre⋅ft)

Llyn Alaw
- Site of Special Scientific Interest
- Location within Wales
- Location of Llyn Alaw.
- Area of search: West Gwynedd
- Interest: Biological
- Area: 353.63 ha (873.8 acres)
- Notification date: 1968

Llyn Alaw (Welsh for 'lily lake') is a man-made reservoir on Anglesey, North Wales, managed by Dŵr Cymru Welsh Water. It is a shallow lake and was built in 1966. It is a Site of Special Scientific Interest and a destination for overwintering birds.

== History ==
It is used to supply drinking water to the northern half of the island and does so at a rate of 35 million litres a day. Filling began in November 1965, flooding the existing marsh of Cors y Bol, and was completed in January 1966. It was officially opened on 21 October 1966. Due to the area being marshland no houses or farms, let alone hamlets or villages had to be abandoned to create it.

The catchment is largely agricultural, and few notable rivers feed into the lake. The storage capacity is mostly generated through trapping winter rainfall and drawing down the level in the summer months. The reservoir itself is 4.3 kilometres long with a surface area of 3.6 km^{2} making it the largest body of water on the island, but it only ever reaches a depth of 5.2 metres.

== The reservoir ==
The lake is a designated SSSI because of the variety and numbers of wild fowl visiting the lake, especially overwintering birds including the Eurasian Teal, northern shoveler and whooper swan. Other waterfowl include mallard, wigeon, common goldeneye, common pochard, tufted duck, ruddy duck and occasionally pink-footed goose. The lake is only a few metres deep as it was formed by flooding a former bog. The surrounding area is flat with a marshy area to the north of the lake. The shore is bordered by vegetation and has bushes and scrub in some areas. There are a number of low islets and in summer, when water levels are low, the lake is bordered by mud flats. Facilities for visitors include a car park, three picnic sites and several miles of footpaths, although these do not allow visitors to make a complete circuit of the lake.

Recent developments have included the provision of nature conservation facilities and way-marked walks around the margin. The lake has an active fishery. The lake contains wild brown trout and is stocked with rainbow trout and is considered one of the most productive lakes in Wales.
