= Afon Cefni =

River on the island of Anglesey, Wales

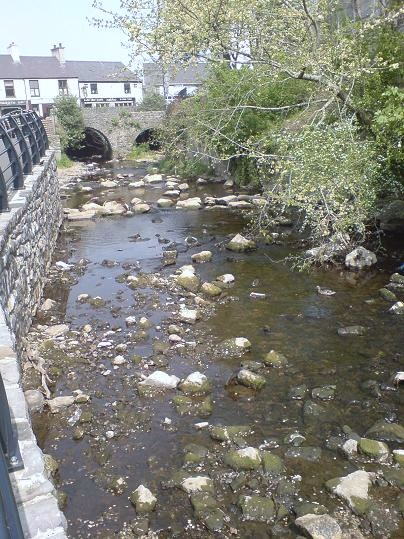

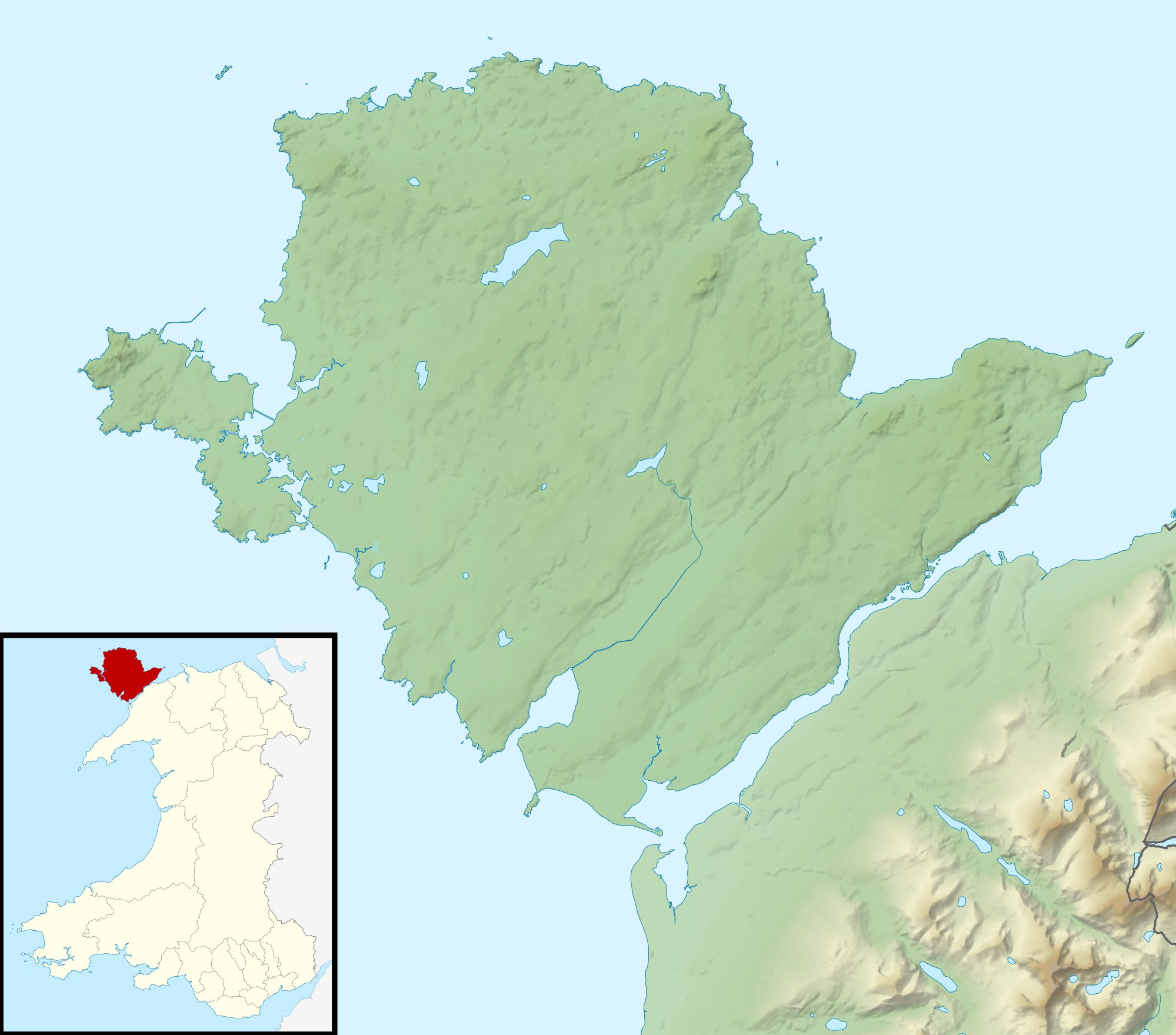
- Location of the mouth

Location
- Country: Wales

Physical characteristics
- Source: Llyn Cefni
- Mouth: Irish Sea
  - location: Malltraeth Sands
  - coordinates: 53°11′08″N 4°23′51″W
- Length: 16.9 km (10.5 mi)

Afon Cefni is one of the major rivers on the island of Anglesey, Wales. It is 16.9 kilometres (11 mi) long. Its source is near to the village of Capel Coch, before flowing through Bodffordd and into Llyn Cefni in the centre of the island. It continues to run south through the county town of Llangefni. Just north of the A55 the river turns and flows south-west. It passes through the flatlands of the Malltraeth Marshes, where the river course was altered in 1824, creating a canal-like straight stretch. This part of the river and the surrounding marshes, part of which is a RSPB reserve, are frequented by a variety of wetland birds which in their turn are preyed on by falcons, hawks and harriers. A cycle trail follows the straightened course of the river as it flows through the marshes.

Finally it flows under a bridge carrying the North Wales Coast Railway Line at Malltraeth Sands in the south-west of the island and into the Irish Sea. The viaduct is described as "noble" and has nineteen arches. An embankment carries the A4080 across the estuary at the village of Malltraeth, half a mile below the railway bridge. Another RSPB reserve is to be found in the estuary here, Newbourough Warren. Malltraeth Pool at the north end of the estuary is a place visited by many waterbirds during their spring and autumn migrations, and other wildfowl and waders are to be seen on the estuary all winter. Newborough Forest on the southern shore is used by large numbers of ravens as a winter roost, and a peninsula and a rocky islet in the estuary are a breeding ground for shags and cormorants.

Migration of fish and eels is effectively blocked by the dam at the Cefni water treatment works, holding back the Cefni reservoir. Attempts to prompt the installation of a fish pass have proven unsuccessful to date.

There was a ship named after the river built in Glasgow in 1890 by a company based in Menai Bridge.

There is currently a tug named Afon Cefni, operated by Holyhead Towing. It can be tracked on Ship AIS websites.
