= Llanddwyn Beach =

Beach in Anglesey, Wales

Llanddwyn Beach Traeth Llanddwyn (Welsh) Newborough Beach (Traeth Niwbwrch)
- Beach
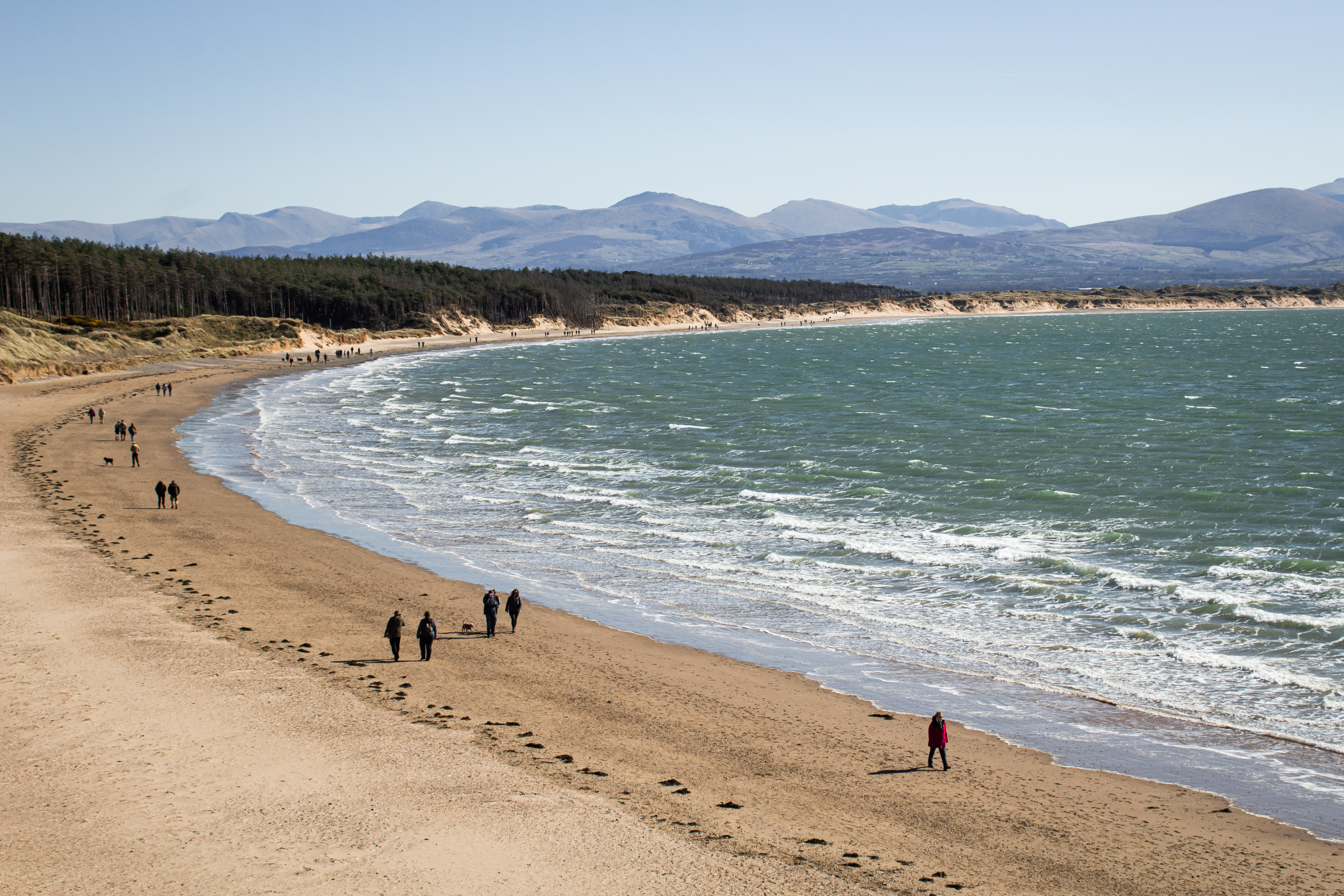
- The beach from the west near the island, with Newborough Forest behind the beach and Snowdonia (Eryri) in the background.
- Interactive map of Llanddwyn Beach
- Coordinates: 53.1406°N 4.3884°W
- Location: Rhosyr, Anglesey, Wales
- Operator: Natural Resources Wales

Dimensions
  - Length: 3.5 mi (5.6 km)

Llanddwyn Beach (Welsh: Traeth Llanddwyn), also known as Newborough Beach, is a beach in Anglesey, North Wales. It runs along Llanddwyn Bay, the Newborough Warren dune system and Newborough Forest. It is 3.5 miles (5.6 km) long, stretching from Ynys Llanddwyn island in the west to Abermenai Point in the east. The village of Newborough is nearby.

It is designated as part of a national nature reserve and a site of special scientific interest. It is also a Blue Flag beach.

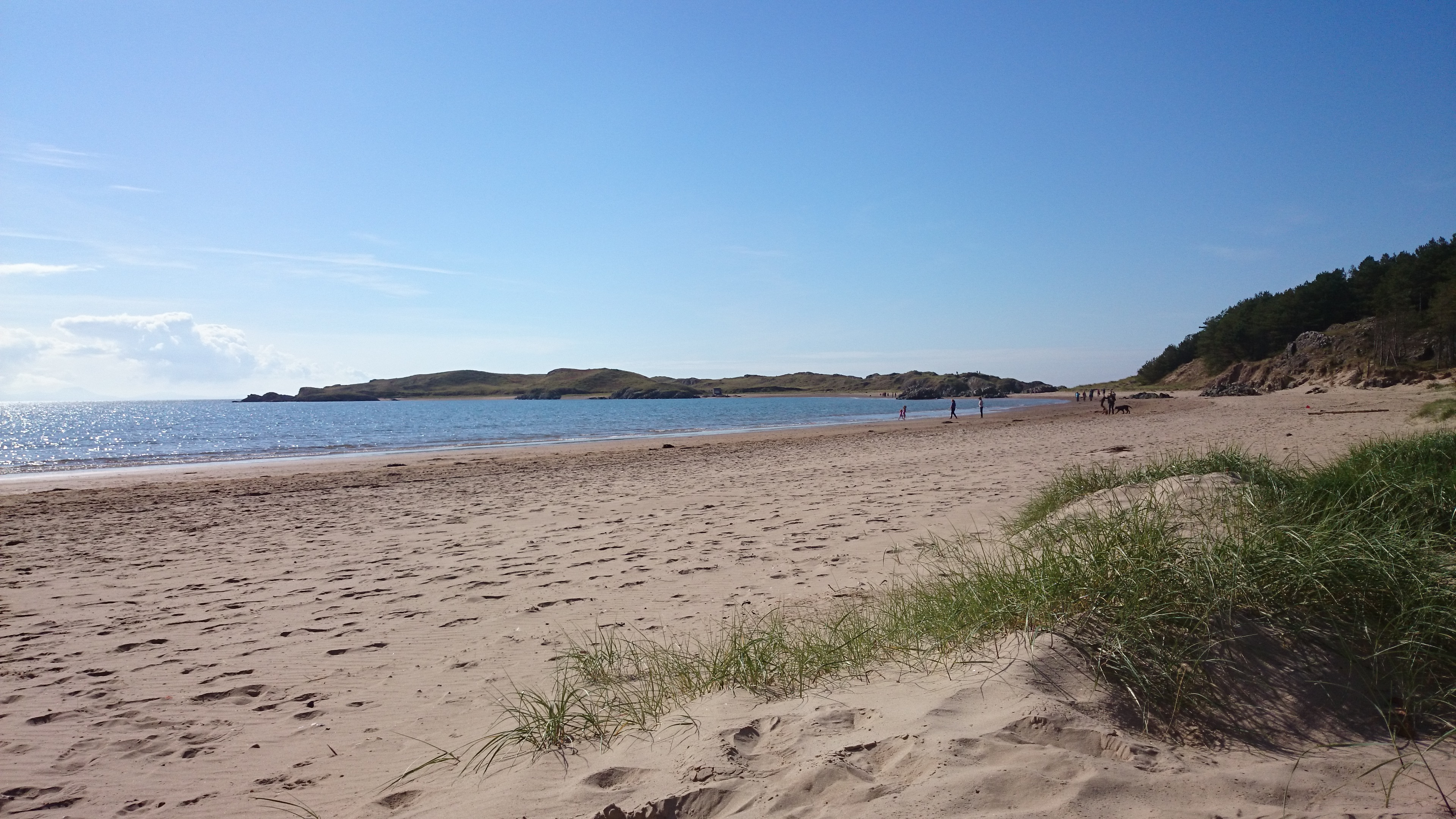
The beach looking towards Ynys Llanddwyn island.

== Location ==
It is located on the southwest coast of the island of Anglesey, near the village of Newborough. and runs along Llanddwyn Bay. It is bounded on land by Newborough Forest and Newborough Warren, until it reaches the tidal island (or peninsula) of Ynys Llanddwyn. It is known as "Llanddwyn beach" or "Newborough beach".

Part of it is next to the Newborough Warren, one of the largest dune systems in the United Kingdom. The warren and nearby Ynys Llanddwyn island have formed the Newborough Warren and Ynys Llanddwyn National Nature Reserve (NNR) since 1955. It also falls within the Newborough Warren - Ynys Llanddwyn Site of Special Scientific Interest which also includes the neighbouring Newborough Forest, which is not part of the NNR.

== Geology ==
The area was formed 700 years ago during a strong storm that blew sand inland. During the Elizabethan era, Marram grass was planted to help stabilise the land, and in 1947 parts of the dunes were planted with trees to prevent sand engulfing Newborough village.

There is a ridge of precambrian rock that extends from the forest towards Ynys Llanddwyn island, with the island being a "narrow finger" landform containing a lighthouse, pilots' cottages and islets, and a home for cormorants. The warren is notable for its wildflowers and butterflies. Ringed plovers are present along the water's edge, while grey seals swim in the bay.

The beach is 3.5 miles (5.6 km) long stretching between Ynys Llanddwyn island and Abermenai Point. It is bounded by Abermenai Beach (Traeth Abermenai / Traeth Melynog) to the east, and to the west on the otherside of Ynys Llanddwyn island by Traeth Penrhos beach.

== Tourism ==
The beach is used for sunbathing and kitesurfing. Concerns have been raised by locals whether it is, or should be a, nudist beach. Llanddwyn beach and the nearby forest and dunes are managed by Natural Resources Wales (NRW). It is one of Wales' Blue Flag beaches.

The beach was a location used to film the House of the Dragon HBO TV series in 2023. Condé Nast Traveller described it as one of the UK's best beaches. It has been nicknamed the "Beach of Romance", in reference to princess Dwynwen, who became Wales' patron saint of lovers.

== Congestion ==
Due to the popularity of the beach, restrictions and higher parking charges had been put in place by Natural Resources Wales in 2025 to reduce congestion and protect the wildlife. In May 2025, locals blockaded the beach access road in protest against the congestion. In August 2025, the beach had to close for three hours as wardens were unable to control the numbers of unlawfully lit fires and barbecues due to the high visitor numbers. In October 2025, NRW replaced the barrier system on the narrow access road leading to the beach was replaced with an Automatic number-plate recognition system using CCTV cameras, where payment is collected through an app. The barrier system was blamed for causing gridlock on roads when visitor numbers were high.
