= Prichard-Jones baronets =

Baronetcy in the Baronetage of the United Kingdom

- Escutcheon of the Prichard-Jones baronets of Bron Menai (1910)
- Creation date: 1910
- Status: dormant
- Motto: Ventus secundet

The Jones, later Prichard-Jones Baronetcy, of Bron Menai, Dwyran, in Llangeinwen in the County of Anglesey, is a title in the Baronetage of the United Kingdom, created on 15 July 1910 for John Prichard Jones, head of Dickins and Jones (Limited) and founder of the Prichard-Jones Institute and Cottage Homes, Newborough, Anglesey. By 1911 he had adopted a hyphen to make Prichard part of his surname.

The 2nd Baronet was educated at Eton College and Christ Church, Oxford, graduating BA and MA. In 1936 he was called to the bar from Gray's Inn and during the Second World War was commissioned into The Bays, rising to the rank of captain.

== Jones, later Prichard-Jones baronets, of Bron Menai (1910) ==
- Sir John Prichard-Jones, 1st Baronet (1845–1917)
- Sir John Prichard-Jones, 2nd Baronet (1913–2007)
- Sir David John Walter Prichard-Jones, 3rd Baronet (born 1943).

His heir presumptive is a cousin, Richard Stephen Prichard-Jones (born 1952), a son of the first baronet's younger son.

== Notes ==
Baronetage of the United Kingdom
Preceded by Harmsworth baronets	Jones baronets of Bron Menai; 15 July 1910	Succeeded by Lamont baronets
