= St Peter's Church, Newborough =

Church in Anglesey, Wales

Coordinates: 53.1628°N 4.3649°W

St Peter's Church
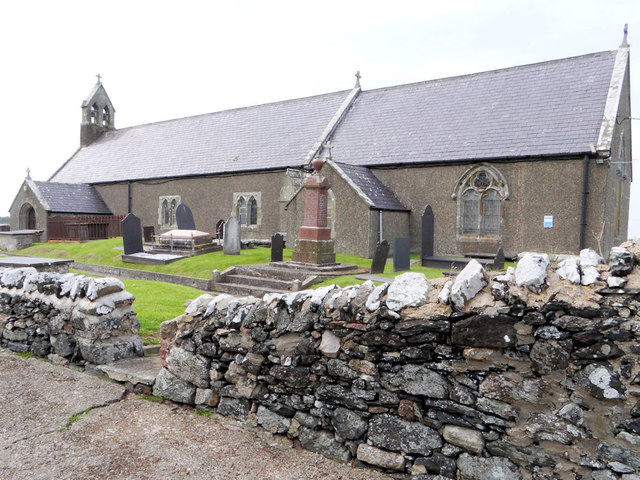
- St Peter's Church
- Country: Wales
- Denomination: Church in Wales

Architecture
- Heritage designation: Grade II*
- Designated: 30 January 1968
- Architectural type: Church
- Style: Medieval

St Peter's Church is a medieval church situated on the western side of the village of Newborough, Anglesey, Wales. The building dates from the early 14th century and underwent restorations in the 19th century. It was designated a Grade II*-listed building on 30 January 1968. It has an interesting history and is the longest church on Anglesey.

== History and location ==
St Peter's was originally known as Llananno. Some people believe that it was founded in about 500 AD by a noble couple, Amon of Dyfed and his wife Anna of Gwynedd. They were the parents of Saint Sampson, the abbot and patron saint of Caldey Island in Pembrokeshire. Others say the church was dedicated to Saint Amo, sharing its dedication with St Anno's Church, Llananno in Radnorshire. Whatever the facts of the matter, the church is situated beside Llys Rhosyr, the Anglesey residence of the Princes of Gwynedd, and is likely to have been associated with the royal court.

The church walls are covered entirely with roughcast, which has hidden or destroyed evidence of the various building periods.

It is thought that the chancel was built first, serving as a royal chapel, and dedicated to St Mary. A separate chapel was built end to end with it and dedicated to St Peter. Later these two buildings were united into one long building, the longest church in Anglesey. There are differences in roof height, roof structure and stonework between the two parts.

The oldest parts of the church are the eastern side of the chancel and nave, which date from the early 14th century. The nave was extended to the west in either the late 15th or early 16th century. The structure was restored in 1850 and again in 1886. It was granted Grade II*-listed status on 30 January 1968, being considered to be a good example of a restored late medieval church.

According to the Rev J Iorwerth Parry, the rector from 1942-75, the gritstone font dates to 1150 and is among the earliest in Wales. The rim of the font is chamfered and the surface is decorated with three rectangular carved panels containing 1) a crude interlaced cross with Stafford knots at the terminations; 2) two vertical rows of incised and interlaced loop work, and 3) a Maltese cross formed of triangular knotwork with a central ring, apparently unfinished. A fourth panel is blank.

According to Parry, the incisions on the stonework of the inner doorway "were probably made by archers sharpening their arrows while practising in the churchyard", and the worn stone benches beneath the present wooden seats would be similar to the only seating available at one time, and probably reserved for the "elderly and decrepit".

As of 1975, there were two bells, one brought from Llanddwyn church when it closed in the late 1500s and the second from 1690. Both bells, which weigh 52kg each, were recast in 1892 in Whitechapel, London.

There are gravestones in arches in the north and south wall of the chancel that are 14th century. One is a tapered stone with a floriated cross at the head and a running leaf pattern. The second has an effigy in high relief of a priest in mass vestments. Both have Latin inscriptions.
