= Newborough Warren =

Dune and beach system in Anglesey, Wales

Coordinates: 53.15223°N 4.35608°W

Newborough Warren (Welsh: Tywyn Niwbwrch) near the village of Newborough (Niwbwrch) in Anglesey, Wales, is a large dune and beach system of 2,269 hectares (5,607 acres; 23 km^{2}), approximately half of which is a conifer plantation. The whole area is designated as a Site of Special Scientific Interest and all of the site, except the forest, is a national nature reserve.

The site is bounded on two sides by rivers: to the south-east by the Afon Braint and to the north-west by Afon Cefni. It includes Llanddwyn Bay and Malltraeth Bay, divided by Ynys Llanddwyn, and part of the Anglesey Coastal Path.

== Geomorphology ==
There are large expanses of both active and fixed dunes, although many of the latter have been afforested, along with a freshwater lake, salt marsh and mudflats and a tidal island. The reserve contains an outstanding flora, interesting lichen and moss communities and a wealth of invertebrates. The intertidal mudflats and saltmarshes are important wintering grounds for waders and wildfowl regularly supporting over one per cent of the British population of pintail. Ynys yr Adar, near Ynys Llanddwyn, supports over one per cent of the British breeding population of cormorant.

At the extreme southern tip of the Warren is Abermenai Point, the location of probably the earliest ferry crossing over the Menai Strait to the Welsh mainland.

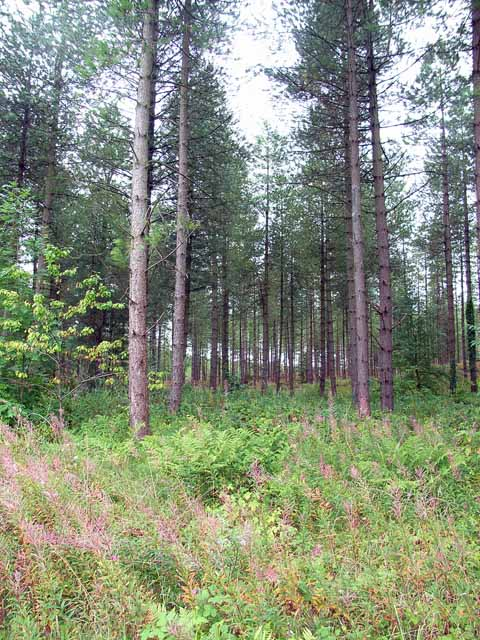
Corsican pines (Pinus nigra) in Newborough Warren

== History ==
Afforestation of the shifting sands on the north side of the Warren began in 1947, partly to protect the village. Artificial dunes were created and the area planted with Corsican and Scots pine (Pinus nigra and Pinus sylvestris). During the late 1970s and 1980s and mid-1990s there were concerns that the water levels within the forest and within neighbouring Warren were falling due to a greater potential evaporation demand caused by afforestation, with the result that winter flooding was not to the same depth and that dune slack pools were drying out sooner. However most UK Atlantic dune systems also reported low water tables, due mainly to low winter rainfall during these times. To address these concerns clearings have been created in the forest, and the forest bordering the warren was heavily thinned. Proposals were put forward in 2004 to remove large parts of the forest. The local community and some conservation groups objected, and in 2008 a public consultation was held into the future management of the woodland.

== Plants ==
There is an outstanding vascular plant assemblage, including the endemic dune helleborine Epipactis dunensis, dwarf adder's tongue Ophioglossum azoricum and shore dock Rumex rupestris. The liverwort Petalophvllum ralphsii is nationally scarce and occurs in some dune slacks whilst on Llanddwyn Island the nationally rare golden hair lichen Teloschistes flavicans has recently been found. Golden samphire Inula crithmoides is also found on the island, most commonly on the path leading to the larger lighthouse. Other interesting plants include dune pansies (Viola curtisii), sea spurge (Euphorbia paralias and Euphorbia portlandica), and sand cat's-tail (Phleum arenarium). and in the dune slacks, creeping willow (Salix repens) and a variety of orchids including the marsh orchid (Dactylorhiza purpurella), along with butterwort (Pinguicula vulgaris), grass of parnassus (Parnassia palustris) and yellow bird's-nest (Monotropa hypopitys) can be seen. In the last decade, the round-leaved wintergreen (Pyrola rotundifolia) has spread across much of the dune system.

== Animals ==
Birds common to the dunes include herring gulls, oystercatchers, lapwings, curlew, skylarks and meadow pipits. The dunes are also home to toads and lizards as well as many species of insects. The Warren was featured on the BBC TV programme Autumnwatch in November 2008 in a feature showing the importance of ravens to the area.
