= Abermenai Point =

Headland on Anglesey, Wales

Coordinates: 53.12691°N 4.33144°W

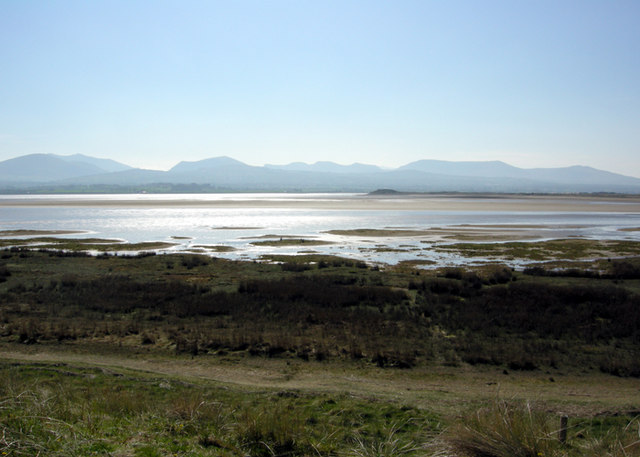
Looking across the tidal sands of Traeth Abermenai to Abermenai Point, from the edge of the dunes

Abermenai Point (Welsh: Pwynt Abermenai) is a headland in the southeast of the island of Anglesey in Wales. It is the southernmost point of the island and is the northern point of the western entrance of the Menai Strait.

The headland is mainly composed of sand dunes at the end of Newborough Warren and has no road leading up to or onto it. The nearest major public road, along which a public bus runs is the A4080 at Newborough. Due to its exposed location and the nature of the straits the Ordnance Survey map for the point carries a warning "Public Rights of Way to Abermenai Point can be dangerous under tidal conditions."

The earliest recorded ferry crossing route from the island to the mainland ran from the point to the site at which Fort Belan now sits. Records in the late 11th century relating to the then King of Gwynedd, Gruffudd ap Cynan state that a ferryman was employed there and ferry houses at both locations have been recorded throughout history. On Gruffudd ap Cynan's death in 1137, the income from the port of Abermenai was inherited by his wife Angharad ferch Owain.

In 1725, Daniel Defoe, the author of novels such as "Robinson Crusoe" used the crossing on his way to Holyhead. The ferry ceased to run in the mid-19th century and by the 1940s almost all trace of it had disappeared. The decline of the ferry service may have been due to the opening of the Menai Suspension Bridge in 1826 and the Britannia Bridge in 1850, which provided road and rail links to Anglesey.
