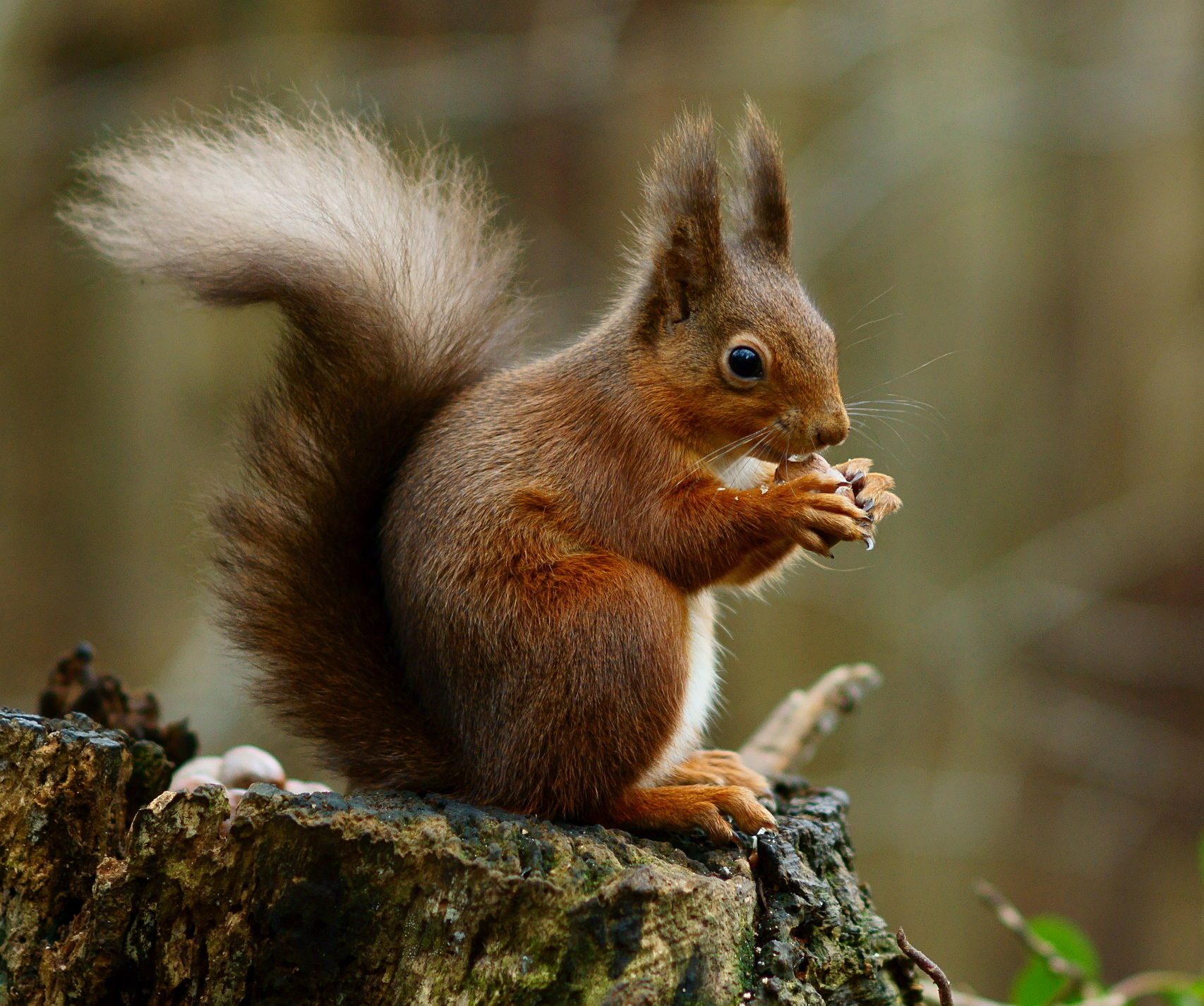
- Red squirrel in winter coat near Alverstone, Isle of Wight
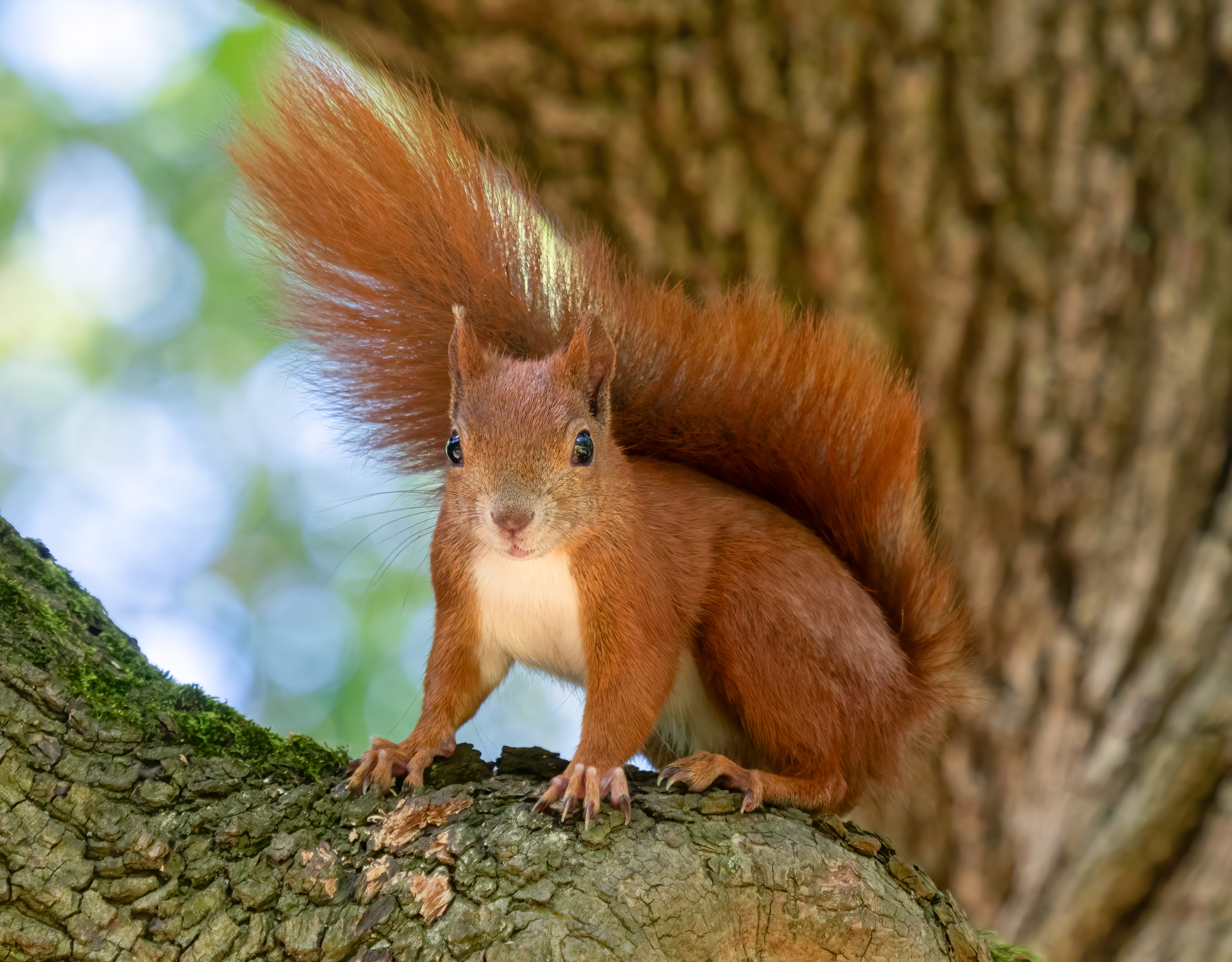
- Red squirrel in summer coat in Warsaw, Poland

Conservation status
- Least Concern (IUCN 3.1)

Scientific classification
- Kingdom: Animalia
- Phylum: Chordata
- Class: Mammalia
- Order: Rodentia
- Family: Sciuridae
- Genus: Sciurus
- Species: S. vulgaris

Binomial name
- Sciurus vulgaris Linnaeus, 1758

Subspecies
- 23 recognized, see text
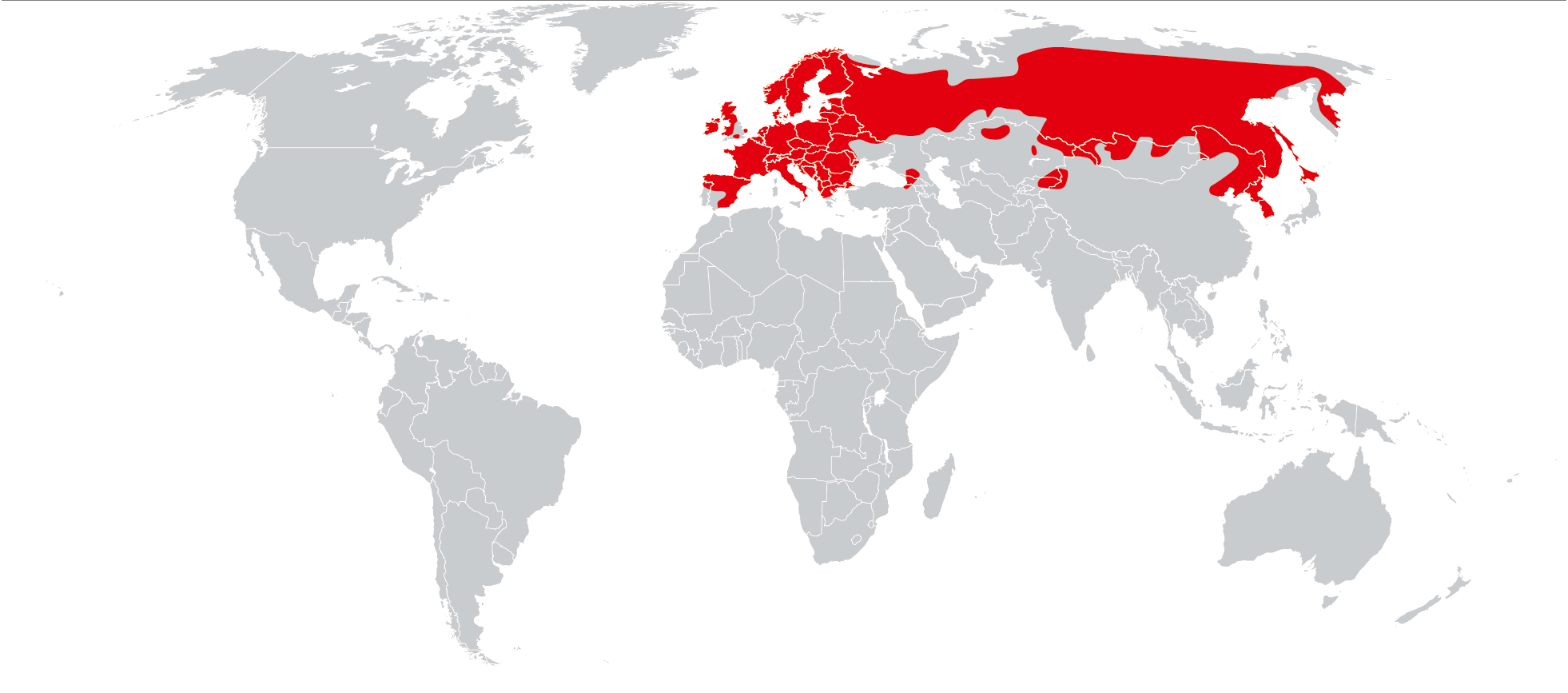
- Red squirrel range

= Red squirrel =

Species of tree squirrel common in Europe and Asia

The red squirrel (Sciurus vulgaris), also called Eurasian red squirrel, is a species of tree squirrel in the genus Sciurus. It is an arboreal and primarily herbivorous rodent and common throughout Eurasia.

== Taxonomy ==
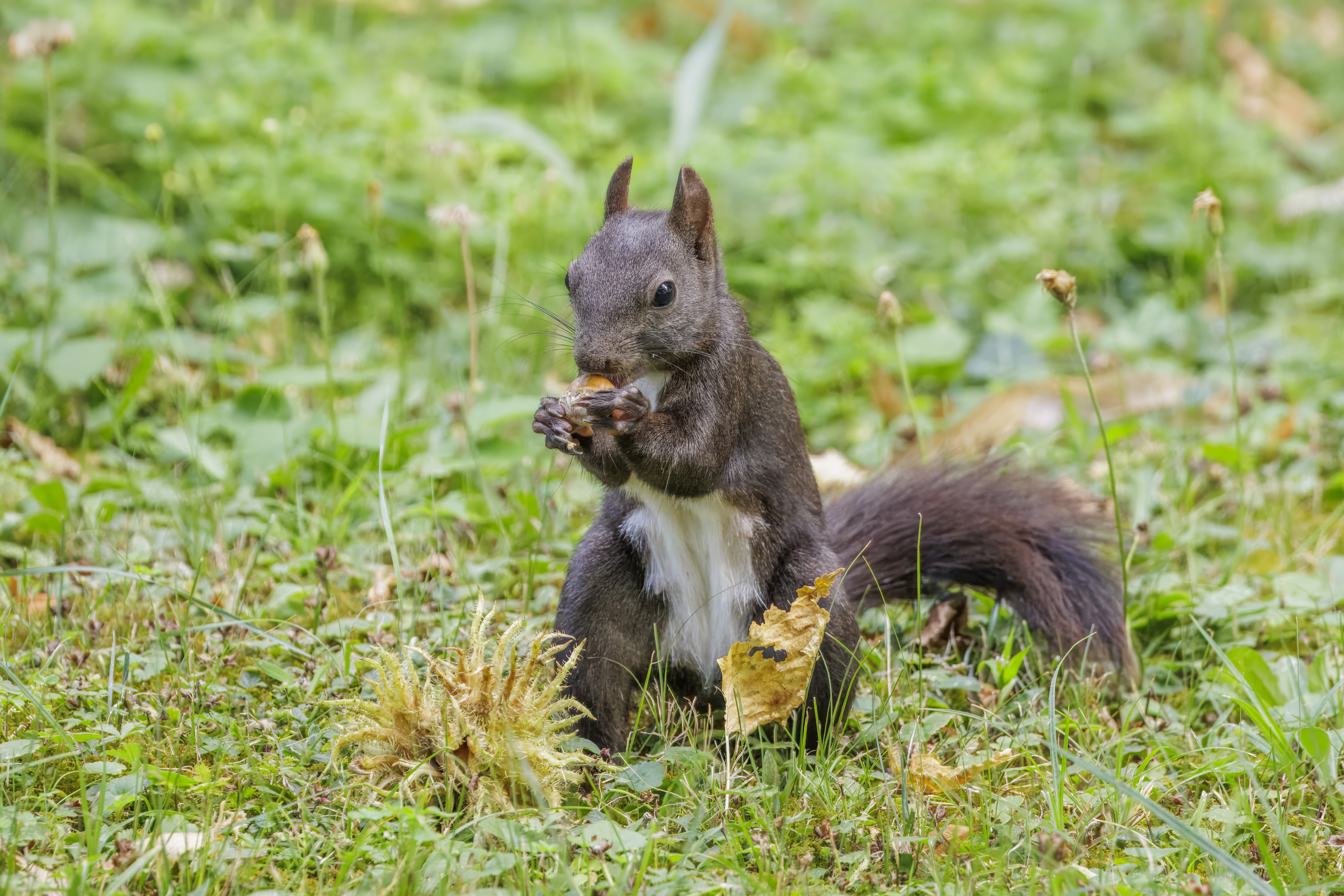
S. v. fuscoater, a dark-furred subspecies, in Vienna

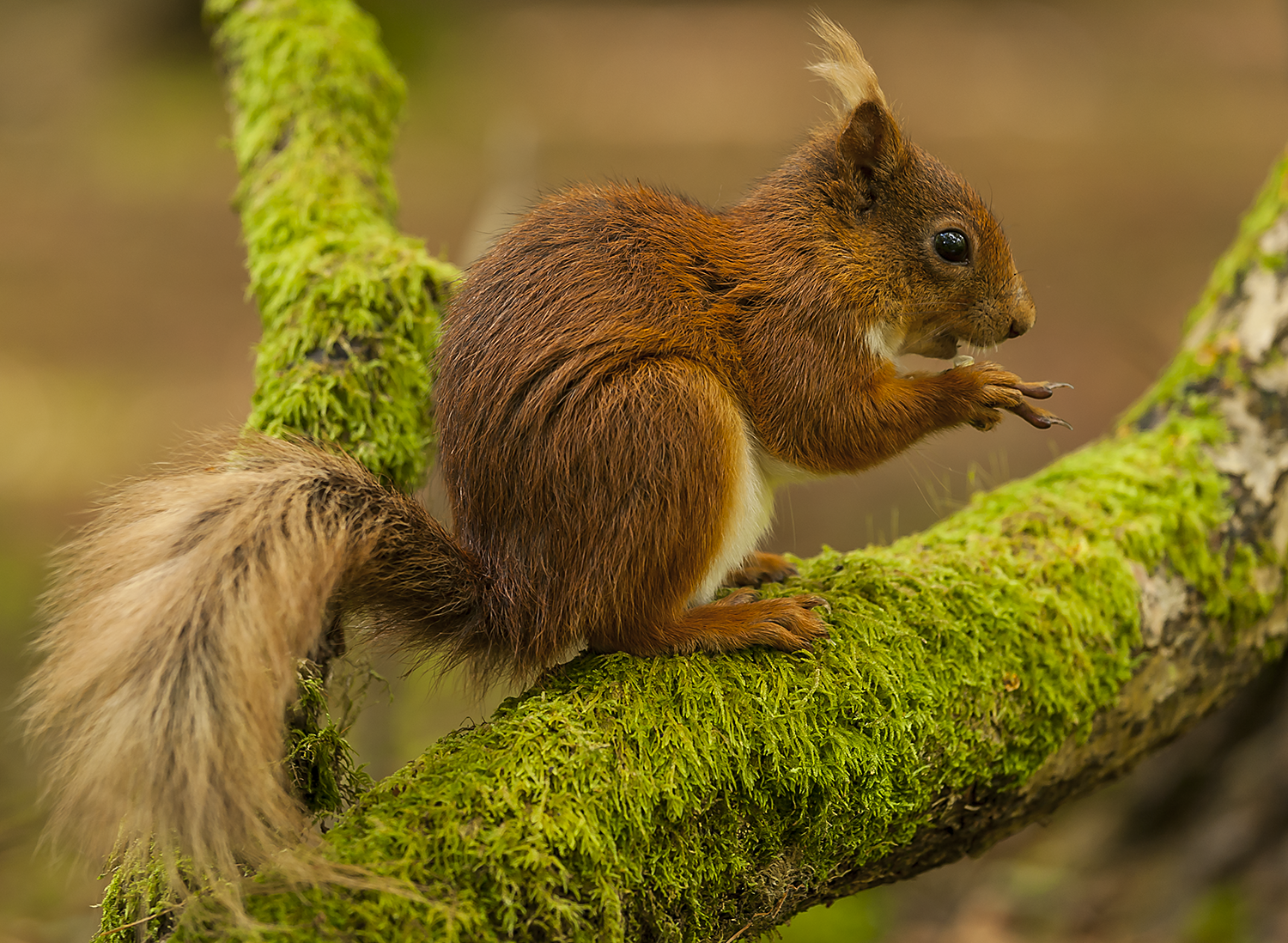
British Isles red squirrel (S. v. leucourus) in Ireland. leucourus is endemic to Ireland and Britain, and has a lighter tail and ears compared to other subspecies. 43% of red squirrels in Ireland are non-native red squirrels from mainland Europe, which are not leucourus

There have been over 40 described subspecies of the red squirrel, but the taxonomic status of some of these is uncertain. A study published in 1971 recognises 16 subspecies and has served as a basis for subsequent taxonomic work. Although the validity of some subspecies is labelled with uncertainty because of the large variation in red squirrels even within a single region, others are relatively distinctive. At present, there are 23 recognized subspecies of the red squirrel.

A number of subspecies of S. vulgaris have been classified as distinct species. S. v. meridionalis of South Italy was elevated to species status as the Calabrian black squirrel in 2017, which descends from a single source population in central Calabria that became isolated in the Middle Pleistocene. The Japanese squirrel, Sciurus lis, was also historically classified as a subspecies of S. vulgaris, although scientific opinion shifted towards classifying it as a distinct species beginning in the 1960s. The Japanese squirrel likely originated through peripatric speciation from a population of red squirrels that colonized the Japanese archipelago in the Pleistocene and speciated into a distinct population due to the isolation of the islands from the Eurasian mainland, emerging as a recognizable species by the Middle Pleistocene. Genetic studies indicate that another subspecies, S. v. hoffmanni of Sierra Espuña in southeast Spain (below included in S. v. alpinus), may also merit recognition as distinct.

- S. v. alpinus. Desmarest, 1822. (synonyms: S. v. baeticus, hoffmanni, infuscatus, italicus, numantius and segurae) Iberian Peninsula, southern France, and Italy. Fur is intense russet-brown.
- S. v. altaicus. Serebrennikov, 1928. Altai region of Russia and Mongolia. Highly variable colouration, including very dark variants.
- S. v. anadyrensis. Ognev, 1929. Far north of Russia and Siberia. Winter coloration has faint chestnut distributed in the main grey colour.
- S. v. arcticus. Trouessart, 1906. (synonym: S. v. jacutensis) Boreal Siberia until the Lena River. Fur is red to bay, with a white belly.
- S. v. balcanicus. Heinrich, 1936. (synonyms: S. v. istrandjae and rhodopensis) Eastern Balkan Peninsula. Fur is brown.
- S. v. chiliensis. Sowerby III, 1921. Eastern China. Fur is primarily black, with traces of red.
- S. v. cinerea. Hermann, 1804.
- S. v. dulkeiti. Ognev, 1929. Amur region of eastern Russia, including the Shantar Islands. Black to dark chestnut fur, with a black tail.
- S. v. exalbidus. Pallas, 1778. (synonyms: S. v. argenteus and kalbinensis) Western Siberia, east of the Ob River. Light colouration, which becomes pale grey in winter.
- S. v. fedjushini. Ognev, 1935. Belarus. Body is dark red to brown, tail is dark chestnut or red.
- S. v. formosovi. Ognev, 1935. Northwest Russia. Winter fur is grey with a chestnut tail.
- S. v. fuscoater. Altum, 1876. (synonyms: S. v. brunnea, gotthardi, graeca, nigrescens, russus and rutilans) Central Europe. Bright red with a white belly; brown to black populations also present in parts of its range, such as the Danish archipelago.
- S. v. fusconigricans. Dvigubsky, 1804. Northern Mongolia and China. Summer colouration is dark chestnut to black, winter colouration is black to bluish gray. Belly fur is white in a small area.
- S. v. leucourus. Kerr, 1792. British Isles. Body fur is red, tail often fades to white over the summer.
- S. v. lilaeus. Miller, 1907. (synonyms: S. v. ameliae and croaticus). Western Balkan Peninsula. Typically brown.
- S. v. mantchuricus. Thomas, 1909. (synonyms: S. v. coreae and coreanus). Northeastern China and the Korean Peninsula. Winter fur is dark grey. Tail is black year-round.
- S. v. martensi. Matschie, 1901. (synonym: S. v. jenissejensis) Western Siberia, west of the Ob River. Summer fur has traces of yellow on the hips. Winter fur is pale gray. Tail is chestnut coloured.
- S. v. ognevi. Migulin, 1928. (synonyms: S. v. bashkiricus, golzmajeri and uralensis) Western Russia. Small and highly variable in colouration. Winter fur is light gray with traces of buff.
- S. v. orientis. Thomas, 1906. Ezo Red Squirrel. Hokkaidō, in the Japanese Archipelago. Fur is gray, with a white belly. South of Hokkaidō it is replaced by the Japanese squirrel, Sciurus lis.
- S. v. rupestris. Thomas, 1907. Sakhalin. Fur is black or dark chestnut, with a black tail throughout the year.
- S. v. ukrainicus. Migulin, 1928. (synonym: S. v. kessleri) Ukraine. Reddish-brown colour, which is mostly retained during the winter. It is replaced by S. v. fuscoater in the Carpathian Mountains.
- S. v. varius. Gmelin, 1789. Northern Scandinavia. Winter colouration is light blueish-grey. Tail is chestnut to red.
- S. v. vulgaris. Linnaeus, 1758. (synonyms: S. v. albonotatus, albus, carpathicus, europaeus, niger, rufus and typicus) Southern Scandinavia. Reddish coloration lacking dark morphs. Tends to be small in size. Population of red squirrels in the island of Bornholm is S. v. vulgaris, but the rest of the Danish archipelago is inhabited by S. v. fuscoater.

== Description ==
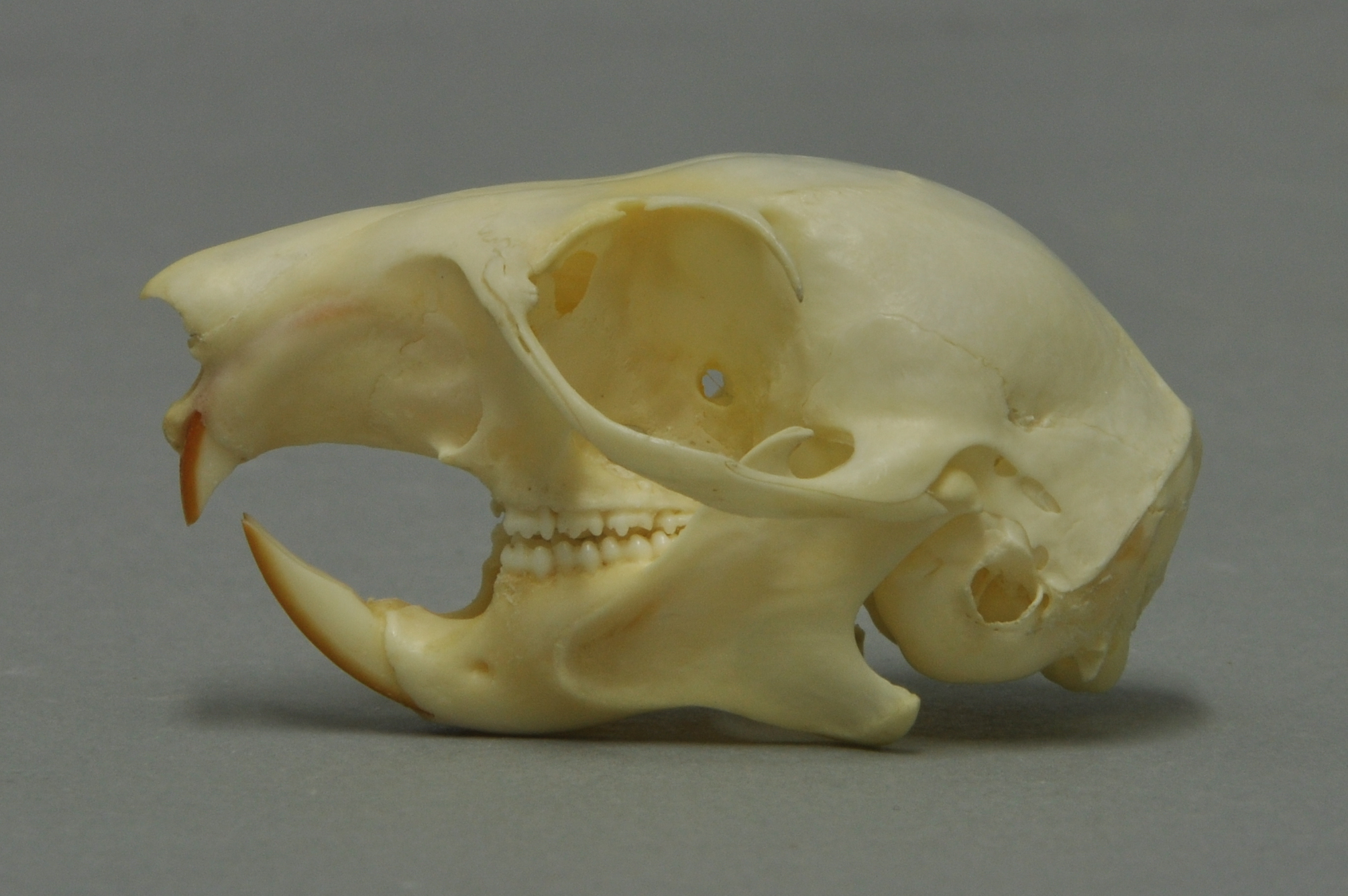
Skull of a red squirrel

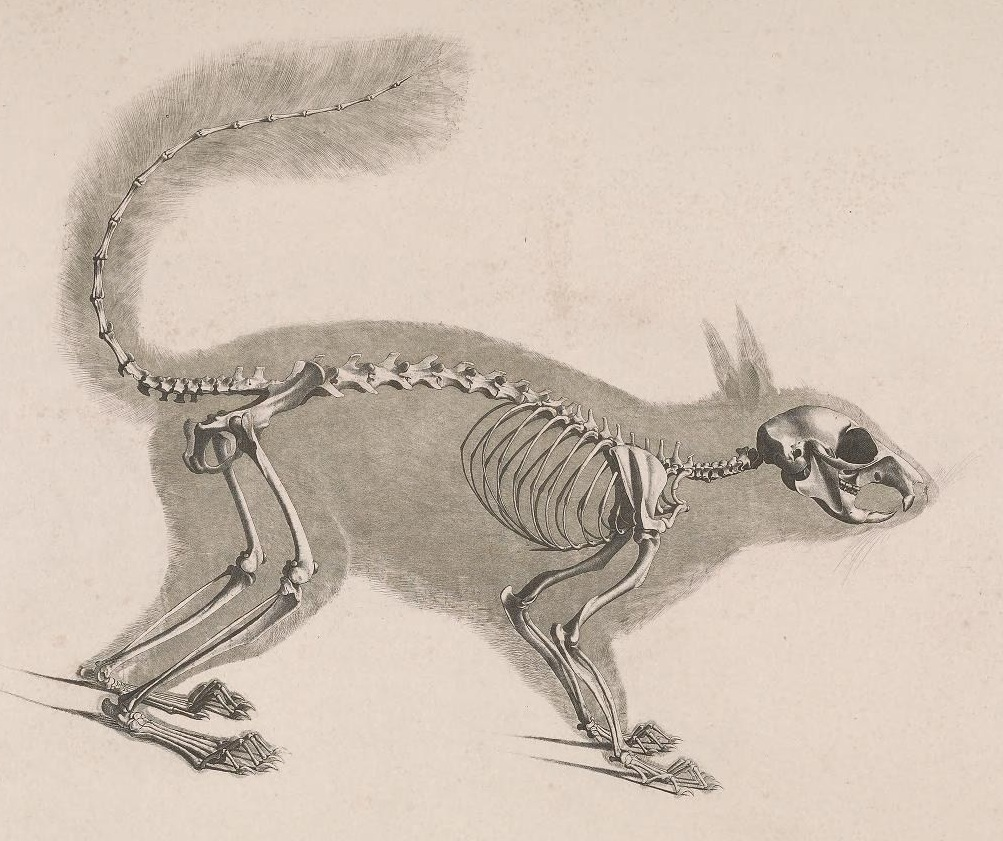
Red squirrel skeleton

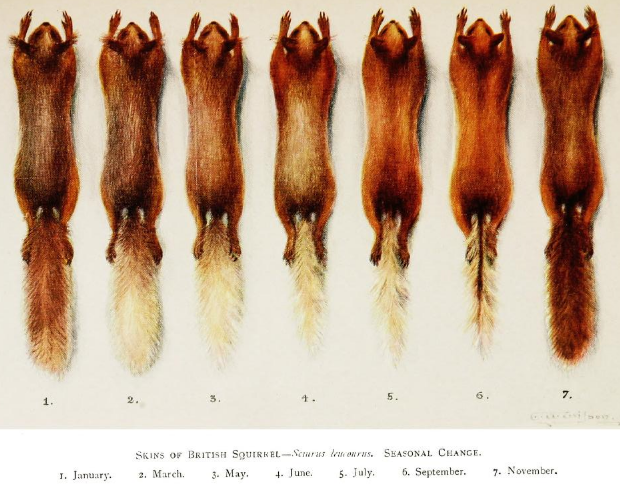
Red squirrel fur at different seasons

The red squirrel has a typical head-and-body length of 19 to 23 cm (7.5 to 9.1 in), a tail length of 15 to 20 cm (5.9 to 7.9 in), and a mass of 250 to 340 g (8.8 to 12.0 oz). Males and females are the same size.

The long tail helps the squirrel to balance and steer when jumping from tree to tree and running along branches, and may keep the animal warm during sleep. It is also used to signal during social interactions.

The dorsal coat color of S. vulgaris is dark but otherwise highly variable. There are several coat colour morphs, ranging through red, reddish-brown, brown, bright chestnut, gray, black, and bluish. Polymorphism is common, although the particular proportions of coat colors vary between different areas. Red coats are most common in Great Britain; in other parts of Europe and Asia different coat colours coexist within populations, much like hair colour in some human populations. Melanism is common, particularly in continental, boreal, and montane populations. Dark coloration is rare in the British Isles. Populations dominated by a single color type are rare and mostly occur on islands.

The underside of the squirrel is always white-cream in colour. The red squirrel sheds its coat twice a year, switching from a thinner summer coat to a thicker, darker winter coat with noticeably larger ear-tufts (a prominent distinguishing feature of this species) between August and November. A lighter, redder overall coat colour, along with the ear-tufts in adults and smaller size, distinguish the red squirrel from the eastern grey squirrel.

The skeleton is physically adapted for climbing and leaping. The red squirrel's bones are relatively light, while the hind legs are disproportionately long and heavy.

== Distribution and habitat ==
The red squirrel is found in both coniferous forest and temperate broadleaf woodlands. Red squirrel populations are densest in large areas of coniferous forest, with secondary densities in mixed forests, deciduous forests, and parklands. They can also be found in suburban areas and in conifer plantations.

Red squirrels occupy boreal, coniferous woods in northern Europe and Siberia, preferring Scots pine, Norway spruce and Siberian pine. In western and southern Europe they are found in broad-leaved woods where the mixture of tree and shrub species provides a better year-round source of food. In most of the British Isles and in Italy, broad-leaved woodlands are now less suitable due to the better competitive feeding strategy of introduced grey squirrels.

In Great Britain, Ireland and in Italy, red squirrel populations have decreased in recent years. This decline is associated with the introduction by humans of the eastern grey squirrel (Sciurus carolinensis) from North America. However, the population in Scotland is stabilising due to conservation efforts.

== Ecology and behaviour ==
The red squirrel is diurnal; activity typically begins at sunrise, but continues after sunset. Between 60% and 80% of its active period may be spent foraging and feeding.

Red squirrels do not hibernate. During the winter, however, they may remain within their nest for several days during severe weather.

Movement on the ground alternates between series of leaps and alert postures, during which the squirrel sits upright with erect ears while sniffing the air. Movement in trees is rapid and agile, and squirrels may leap between distinct trees up to four meters apart. Climbing down trees is done headfirst, with frequent pauses.

=== Diet ===
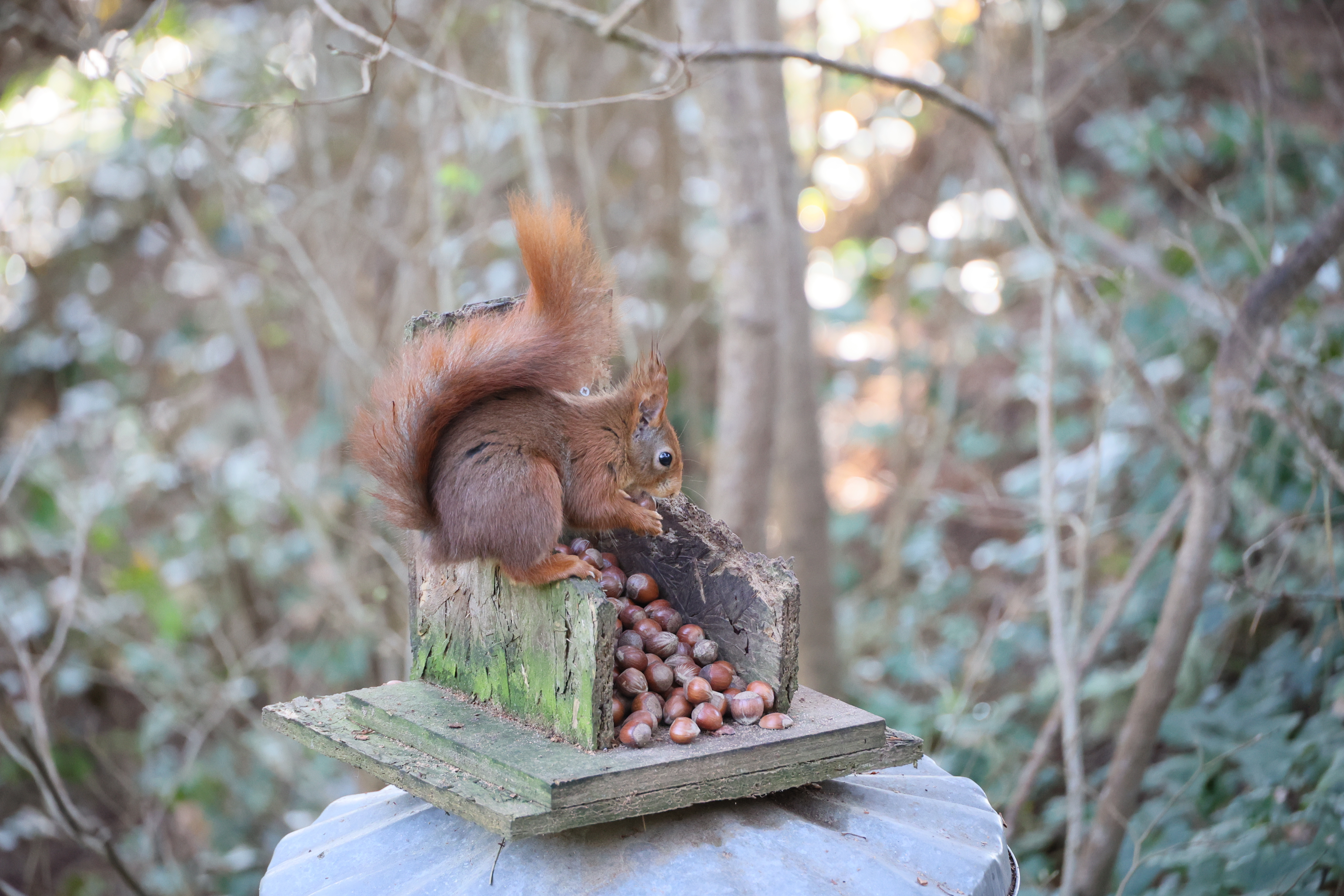
A red squirrel eating hazelnuts

The red squirrel eats mostly the seeds of trees, especially conifers, neatly stripping cones to get at the seeds within, alongside acorns and nuts. Other food sources include fruits and berries, fungi, lichens, young plant shoots, vegetables, garden flowers, and tree sap.

More rarely, red squirrels may also eat invertebrates, bird eggs, or nestlings. A Swedish study shows that out of 600 stomach contents of red squirrels examined, only four contained remnants of birds or eggs.

Excess food is put into caches called "middens", either buried or in nooks or holes in trees, and eaten when food is scarce. Caching occurs most frequently during the fall to create food stores for the winter. Although the red squirrel remembers where it created caches at a better-than-chance level, its spatial memory is substantially less accurate and durable than that of grey squirrels. This scatter-hoarding behavior is more commonly observed in deciduous forests than in coniferous ones. Caching is done most frequently with hard, low-perishability foods such as nuts, acorns, and conifer cones, but fungi are sometimes also stored in trees.

=== Territoriality and nesting ===
Red squirrels make dreys (nests) out of twigs in a branch-fork, forming a domed structure about 25–30 cm (9.8–11.8 in) in diameter. This is lined with moss, leaves, grass, and shredded bark. Tree hollows and woodpecker holes are also used. Dreys are typically built close to the trunk or in a fork of the branches, and are usually at least six meters above the ground. Individual squirrels frequently build multiple dreys and move between them on consecutive nights.

The red squirrel is a solitary animal and is shy and reluctant to share food with others. However, outside the breeding season and particularly in cold months during the winter and spring, several adult squirrels may share a drey to keep warm. Social organization is based on dominance hierarchies within and between sexes; although males are not necessarily dominant to females, the dominant animals tend to be larger and older than subordinate animals, and dominant males tend to have larger home ranges than subordinate males or females. Scent markings are left on trees by rubbing with facial glands, usually at habitual sites. Urine is also used for this purpose. These scent marks serve as both marks of occupied territory and to signal the squirrel's social status and reproductive condition.

Aggressive confrontations between red squirrels typically involve loud calls, foot stamping, and flagging motions with the tail. These may progress into rapid chases and tail-biting.

Typical range size among red squirrels is highly variable, although males tend to maintain larger territories than females. Overlap between territories is common at their edges, particularly when food is abundant, but may be small. Females tend to contract their range when nursing young.

=== Reproduction ===
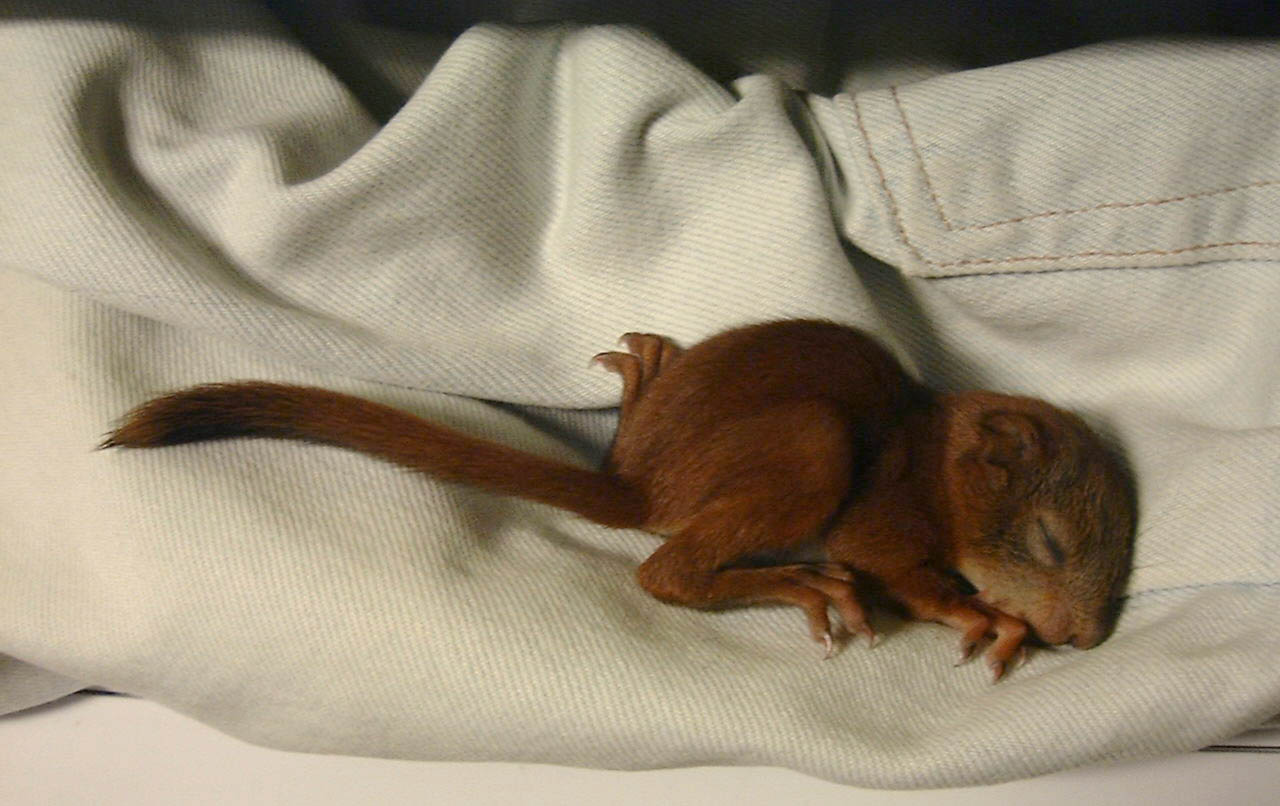
Two-week-old red squirrel

Mating occurs in late winter during February and March and in summer between June and July. Up to two litters a year per female are possible. Each litter averages three young, called kits. Gestation is about 38 to 39 days. The young are looked after by the mother alone and are born helpless, blind, and deaf. They weigh between 10 and 15g. Hair begins to emerge at 8-9 days of age and covers the body at 21 days. The young emerge from the nest after 6-7 weeks and are weaned between 8 and 12 weeks of age, after which they disperse from their birth area. Red squirrels reach adult size at a year of age. Most red squirrels will not reproduce themselves until they are at least 11 months of age, and may not do so until their second year.

Female squirrels enter oestrus once a year for a period of one day. Male squirrels follow them during this time by scent. Up to ten males may chase a single female until the dominant male, usually the largest in the group, mates with her. Copulation lasts less than thirty seconds, after which a copulatory plug will form from the male's semen. Females typically remove this plug to mate with additional males. Unlike females, males are sexually active throughout the mating season, becoming inactive only over the autumn and winter. There is little courtship outside of the mating chase, and males do not participate in rearing young.

=== Life expectancy ===
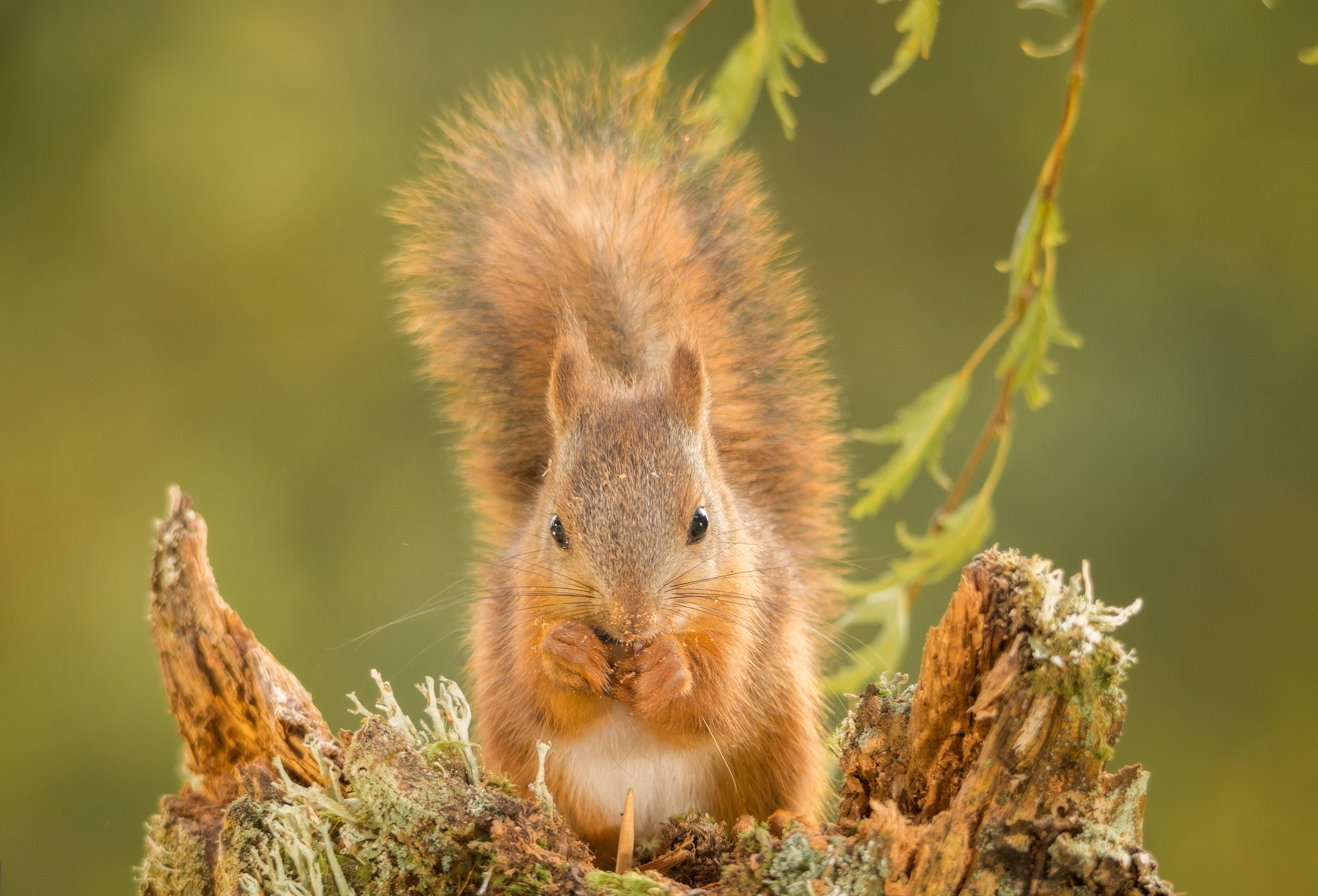
Close-up of a young red squirrel

Red squirrels that survive their first winter have a life expectancy of 3 years. Individuals may reach 7 years of age, and 10 in captivity. Survival is positively related to the availability of autumn-winter tree seeds; on average, 75–85% of juveniles die during their first winter, and mortality is approximately 50% for winters following the first.

=== Predators ===
Red squirrels are preyed upon by a number of predators, including the pine marten, the European wildcat, and predatory birds such as owls, the Eurasian goshawk, and the common buzzard. Stoats also take nestlings. The red fox and domestic cats and dogs also prey on red squirrels when these are on the ground. Domestic cats in particular are a primary predator in suburban areas.

=== Competitors ===
The eastern grey squirrel and the red squirrel are not directly antagonistic, and violent conflict between these species is not a factor in the decline in red squirrel populations. However, the eastern grey squirrel appears to be able to decrease the red squirrel population for several reasons:

- The eastern grey squirrel carries a disease, the squirrel parapoxvirus, that does not appear to affect their own health but will often kill the red squirrel. It was revealed in 2008 that the numbers of red squirrels at Formby (England) had declined by 80% as a result of this disease, though the population is now recovering.
- The eastern grey squirrel can better digest acorns, while the red squirrel cannot access the proteins and fats in acorns as easily.
- The eastern grey squirrel inhabits broadleaf forests at higher densities than red squirrels, and pilfers red squirrel food caches.
- Pressure from grey squirrels also appears to decrease effective reproduction among red squirrels.

In the UK, due to the above circumstances, the population has today fallen to 160,000 red squirrels or fewer; 120,000 of these are in Scotland. Outside the UK and Ireland, the impact of competition from the eastern grey squirrel has been observed in Piedmont, Italy, where two pairs escaped from captivity in 1948. A significant drop in red squirrel populations in the area has been observed since 1970, and it is feared that the eastern grey squirrel may expand into the rest of Europe.

== Conservation ==
The red squirrel is protected in most of Europe, as it is listed in Appendix III of the Bern Convention; it is listed as being of least concern on the IUCN Red List. However, in some areas it is abundant and is hunted for its fur.

Although not thought to be under any threat worldwide, the red squirrel has nevertheless drastically reduced in number in the United Kingdom; especially after the eastern grey squirrel was introduced from North America in the 1870s. Fewer than 140,000 individuals are thought to be left in 2013; approximately 85% of which are in Scotland, with the Isle of Wight being the largest haven in England. A local charity, the Wight Squirrel Project, supports red squirrel conservation on the island, and islanders are actively recommended to report any invasive greys. The population decrease in Britain is often ascribed to the introduction of the eastern grey squirrel from North America.

In addition to competition with the grey squirrel, the red squirrel is also sensitive to habitat fragmentation, and loss of suitable habitat is a significant threat to red squirrels over large portions of their range.

In contrast, the red squirrel may present a threat if introduced to regions outside its native range. It is classed as a "prohibited new organism" under New Zealand's Hazardous Substances and New Organisms Act 1996 preventing it from being imported into the country.

=== Projects ===
Protecting the red squirrel in Clocaenog Forest, Wales

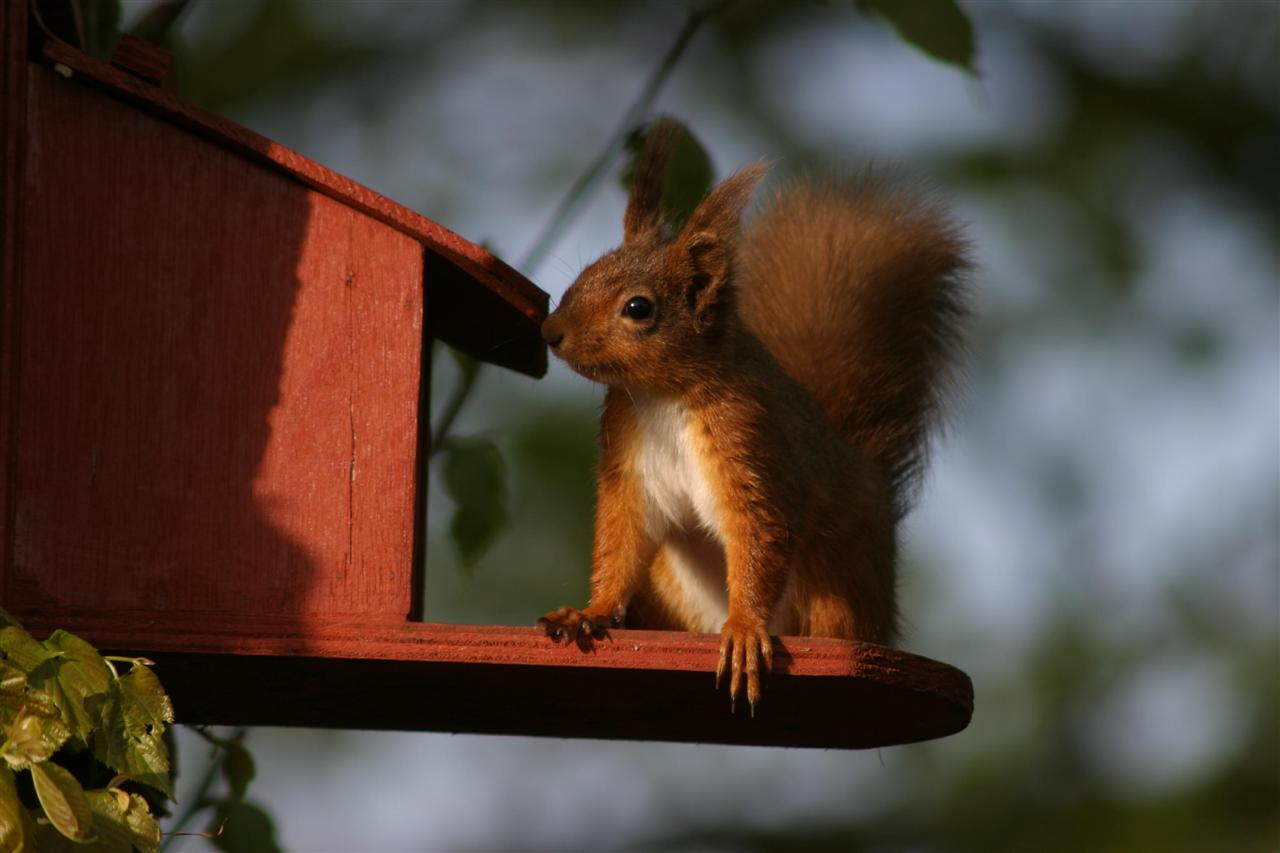
Red squirrel at a feeding tray in the Lake District, England.

In January 1998, eradication of the non-native North American grey squirrel began on the North Wales island of Anglesey. This facilitated the natural recovery of the small remnant red squirrel population. It was followed by the successful reintroduction of the red squirrel into the pine stands of Newborough Forest. Subsequent reintroductions into broadleaved woodland followed and today the island has the single largest red squirrel population in Wales. Brownsea Island in Poole Harbour is also populated exclusively by red rather than grey squirrels (approximately 200 individuals).

Mainland initiatives in southern Scotland and the north of England also rely upon grey squirrel control as the cornerstone of red squirrel conservation strategy. A local programme known as the "North East Scotland Biodiversity Partnership", an element of the national Biodiversity Action Plan was established in 1996. This programme is administered by the Grampian Squirrel Society, with an aim of protecting the red squirrel; the programme centres on the Banchory and Cults areas. In 2008, the Scottish Wildlife Trust announced a four-year project which commenced in the spring of 2009 called "Saving Scotland's Red Squirrels".

Other notable projects include red squirrel projects in the Greenfield Forest, including the buffer zones of Mallerstang, Garsdale and Widdale; the Northumberland Kielder Forest Project; and within the National Trust reserve in Formby. These projects were originally part of the Save Our Squirrels campaign that aimed to protect red squirrels in the north of England, but now form part of a five-year Government-led partnership conservation project called "Red Squirrels Northern England" to undertake grey squirrel control in areas important for red squirrels. However, grey squirrels were found to outnumber red squirrels in both Cumbria and Northumberland for the first time. In Northumberland grey sightings were 25% higher than reds, and in Cumbria they were 17.3% higher.

On the Isle of Wight, local volunteers are encouraged to record data on the existing red squirrel population, and to monitor it for the presence of invasive greys; as the red squirrel is still dominant on the island, these volunteers are also requested to cull any greys they find. In order to protect existing populations, increasing amounts of legislation have been issued to prevent the further release and expansion of grey squirrel populations. Under the Wildlife and Countryside Act 1981, it is an offense to release captured grey squirrels, indicating that any captured individuals must be culled. Additional rules covered under the WCA's Schedules 5 and 6 include limitations on the keeping of red squirrels in captivity, and also prohibits the culling of red squirrels.

Research undertaken in 2007 in the UK credits the pine marten with reducing the population of the invasive eastern grey squirrel. Where the range of the expanding pine marten population meets that of the eastern grey squirrel, the population of these squirrels retreats. It is theorised that, because the grey squirrel spends more time on the ground than the red, they are far more likely to come in contact with this predator.

During October 2012, four male and one female red squirrel, on permanent loan from the British Wildlife Centre, were transported to Tresco in the Isles of Scilly by helicopter, and released into Abbey Wood, near the Tresco Abbey Gardens. Only two survived and a further 20 were transported and released in October 2013. Although the red squirrel is not indigenous to the Isles of Scilly, those who supported this work intend to use Tresco as a "safe haven" for the endangered mammal, as the islands are free of predators such as red foxes, and of the Squirrel parapoxvirus-carrying grey squirrel.

The UK Animal and Plant Health Agency (APHA) has proposed a method of non-lethal control of grey squirrels as part of a 5-year Red Squirrel Recovery Network (RSRN) project. The planned method for control would be by administering oral contraceptives via a grey squirrel-specific feeder, which would selectively allow feeding based on body weight in order to avoid inadvertently distributing the contraceptive to red squirrels as well. This project has received National Lottery Heritage funding.

== Cultural significance ==
Red squirrels on a German coat of arms

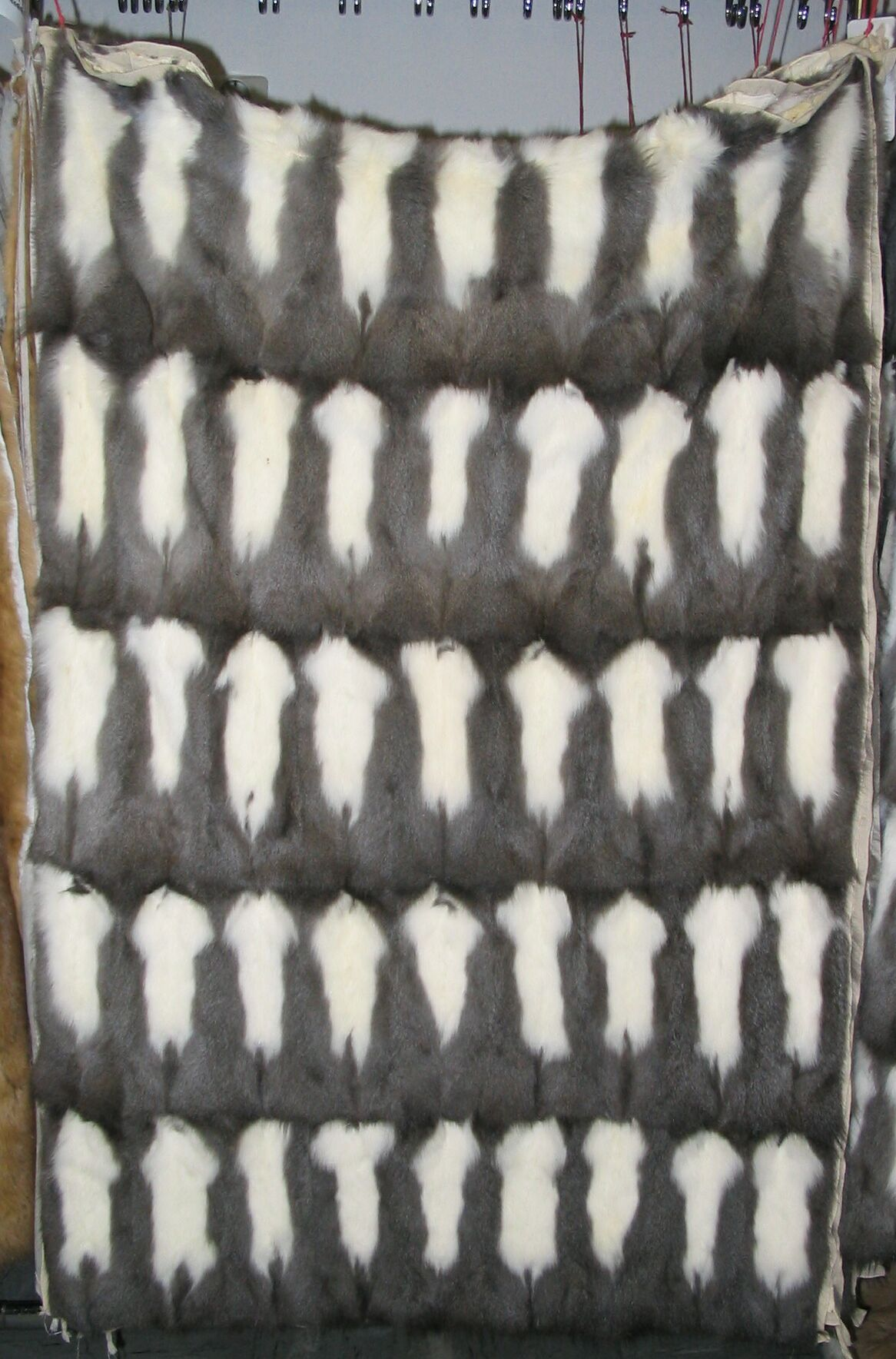
Russian squirrel bellies being prepared in China for use as fur clothing, showing the distinctive pattern that developed into the vair tincture in heraldry

The red squirrel is the national mammal of Denmark.

Red squirrels have historically been hunted both as a game animal and for their furs. The expression "squirrel pelt" is still widely understood there to be a reference to money. It has been suggested that the trade in red squirrel fur, highly prized in the medieval period and intensively traded, may have been responsible for the leprosy epidemic in medieval Europe. Within Great Britain, widespread leprosy is found early in East Anglia, to which many of the squirrel furs were traded, and the strain is the same as that found in modern red squirrels on Brownsea Island.

Red squirrels are frequently valued as appealing wildlife in urban settings. However, they are also seen as a pest in orchards and gardens due to their habit of peeling off tree bark to feed on cambium. Intensive bark-stripping has caused economic damage to conifer plantations in Great Britain, particularly during high activity periods in summer.

Full red squirrels also appear as heraldic charge, generally depicted upright and holding a nut.

== Sources ==
- Thorington, Richard W.; Koprowski, John L.; Steele, Michael A.; Whatton, James F. (2012). Squirrels of the World. Johns Hopkins University Press. ISBN 9781421404691.
