= John Prichard-Jones =

Welsh businessman (1841–1917)

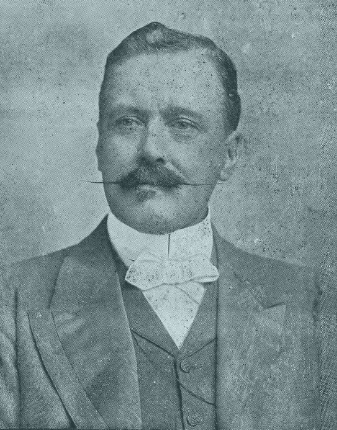
John Prichard-Jones

Sir John Prichard-Jones, 1st Baronet (31 May 1841 – 17 October 1917) was a self-made Welsh business man of the Victorian and Edwardian era. His main business was the London West End department store Dickins & Jones.

For most of his life, he was known as John Jones. In 1878, he was married as John Pritchard Jones; in 1905, his name appeared as John Prichard Jones; in 1910, under that name, he was created a baronet. By the time of his second marriage in 1911, he had adopted a hyphen to become John Prichard-Jones.

== Life ==
Born into a Welsh-speaking family at Tyn-Coed, a small farm near Newborough, Anglesey, his parents were Richard Jones, a farmer, and Jane Jones, formerly Owen. He was recorded as one month old at the 1841 census, when the Jones household condisted of his father and mother, Richard and Jane, aged and his siblings Elinor, Richard, William and Owen, aged 15, 9, 6 and 4. At the age of fourteen, Jones was apprenticed to a draper in Caernarfon and afterwards moved to Pwllheli, then to Bangor and eventually, when he was nineteen, to London. In 1872, he entered the firm of Dickins, Smith & Stevens in Regent Street. There he was successively promoted to buyer, manager, director, chairman of the board, and finally to partner, when the store's name was changed to Dickins & Jones.

Jones was also involved in the management of various other businesses. He played a prominent role in movements advocating for the promotion of workers' welfare, as well as supporting profit-sharing schemes for his employees. Additionally, he served as the Treasurer of the Welsh National Museum and was a member of the Council of the North Wales University College at Bangor. He generously contributed to the college and became Vice-President of the College Council in 1909. In recognition of his contributions, the University of Wales bestowed upon him an honorary doctorate.

Jones maintained lifelong links with his native county, where he had a home, Bron Menai, Dwyran. He was made Sheriff of Anglesey for 1905, and in 1910 was appointed as a Deputy Lieutenant of Anglesey. In July 1910, he was created a Baronet,

As well as his house in Wales, Jones had an English country house at Elstree, in Hertfordshire called Maes yr Hâv.

== Personal life ==
On 27 February 1878, at St Mary Abbots, Kensington, Jones married firstly Mary Coggan Coate, a daughter of Vincent Coate, late of Muchelney, Somerset. She died in October 1901.

In 1905, Jones's English address was Newborough, Canfield Gardens, South Hampstead, N.W.

On 21 January 1911, at St James's Church, West Hampstead, as John Prichard-Jones, Baronet, he married secondly Marie Ethel Read, the younger daughter of Charles Read, a deceased solicitor. With his new wife, he had two sons:

- John Prichard-Jones (1913–2007), educated at Eton College and Christ Church, Oxford, who was called to the bar from Gray's Inn and during the Second World War was commissioned into The Bays, rising to the rank of captain. In August 1937, he married Heather Nugent, daughter of Sir Walter Nugent. Their son David John Walter Prichard-Jones (born 1943) is the present baronet.
- Richard William Prichard-Jones, born 29 October 1914, died 1986, father of Richard Stephen Prichard-Jones (born 1952), heir presumptive to the baronetcy.

Prichard-Jones died at his London home in 1917, after suffering an accident. On his death, he was succeeded in the baronetcy by his elder son, John Prichard-Jones, then aged four. In 1926, his widow married Randal Plunkett, 14th Baron Louth (1868–1941).

== The Prichard Jones Institute ==
The Prichard Jones Institute, opened in 1905 at Newborough, Anglesey, may be described as a community centre for the people of Newborough. It consisted of a library, facilities for exhibitions, meetings and lectures. Also on the site were cottages made available to local elderly people, subject to certain criteria, who would also be paid a pension from a fund established by Sir John Prichard-Jones. The fund was financed through monies gained from a property in London, but unfortunately the property was destroyed through bombing during World War II. Without this fund the building had fallen into disrepair and required renovation.

The Institute is a registered charity.

In 2006 the Pritchard Jones Institute was one of the buildings nominated for the BBC television show Restoration.

Baronetage of the United Kingdom
New creation	Baronet (of Bron Menai); 1910–1917	Succeeded by John Prichard-Jones
