= List of Blue Flag beaches in Wales =

Below is a list of Blue Flag beaches and marinas in Wales, sorted by regulatory body. As of 2022, Keep Wales Tidy announced 53 coastal areas receiving one of three coast awards: the Blue Flag, the Green Coast Award, and the Seaside Award. Of these, 25 Blue Flags were flying at 22 beaches and three marinas. The Blue Flag is an eco-label awarded by the internationally recognized Foundation for Environmental Education (FEE), headquartered in Copenhagen, Denmark. The foundation adds or removes beaches and marinas from its list each July. As of 2025, Keep Wales Tidy announced that 21 Welsh beaches were awarded Blue Flag status, along with 13 Green Coast Awards and 15 Seaside Awards.

The 2022 total was an increase of 13, beaches. In the past the reduced number was due to stricter water quality criteria being used, coupled with the fact that 2012 was a wet year in the country meaning that there were more naturally occurring bacteria present. In comparison, the larger countries of England had 55 and 3 beaches listed and no marinas. Scotland has not participated in the international Blue Flag programme since 2016, when Keep Scotland Beautiful replaced it with Scotland's Beach Award, a national scheme administered independently of the FEE. The Welsh organisation Keep Wales Tidy helps to keep the beaches in good condition as well as running two separate sets of awards - the Green Coast Award and the Seaside Award.

Keep Wales Tidy became an independent charitable organisation in 2005 and is a member of the Foundation for Environmental Education. It has managed the Wales Coast Awards for more than 20 years.

Keep Wales Tidy states that Wales has more Blue Flag beaches per mile of coastline than anywhere else in the United Kingdom.

The vast majority of the beaches and marinas are located on the Wales Coast Path.

Blue Flag Beaches since '2012'.
In 2013 there were 33 beaches and 5 registered marinasru:
1 Abergele, 2 Rhos-on-Sea, 3 Llanddona, 4 Porth Dafarch, 5 Trearddur, 6 New Quay, 7 Saundersfoot, 8 Saundersfoot, 9 Port Einon, 10 Caswell Bay

== Local Authority Maintained ==
- Anglesey - Benllech
- Anglesey - Holyhead (m)
- Anglesey - Llanddona
- Anglesey - Llanddwyn, Newborough
- Anglesey - Porth Dafarch
- Anglesey - Porth Swtan / Church Bay
- Anglesey - Trearddur Bay
- Bridgend - Rest Bay, Porthcawl
- Carmarthenshire - Cefn Sidan, Pembrey Country Park
- Ceredigion - Aberporth
- Ceredigion - Borth
- Ceredigion - New Quay, Harbour
- Ceredigion - Tresaith
- Conwy - Llandudno North Shore
- Gwynedd - Abersoch
- Gwynedd - Dinas Dinlle
- Gwynedd - Morfa Bychan (Black Rock Sands) ^
- Gwynedd - Marian y De, Pwllheli
- Pembrokeshire - Amroth
- Pembrokeshire - Broad Haven North
- Pembrokeshire - Coppet Hall ^
- Pembrokeshire - Dale
- Pembrokeshire - Lydstep
- Pembrokeshire - Newgale
- Pembrokeshire - Saundersfoot
- Pembrokeshire - Whitesands, St Davids
- Pembrokeshire - Tenby, Castle
- Pembrokeshire - Tenby, North
- Pembrokeshire - Tenby, South
- Swansea - Bracelet Bay ^
- Swansea - Caswell Bay
- Swansea - Langland Bay
- Swansea - Port Eynon
- Swansea - Swansea Marina (m)
- Vale of Glamorgan - Penarth Marina (m)

Legend

- ^ = Not currently wheelchair accessible
- (m) = Marina

== Privately Maintained ==
- Caernarfon Harbour Trust - Victoria Dock, Caernarfon (m)
- Parkdean Holidays - Trecco Bay
- Yacht Haven Management - Hafan Pwllheli (m)

Legend

- ^ = Not currently wheelchair accessible
- (m) = Marina
