= Fort Belan =

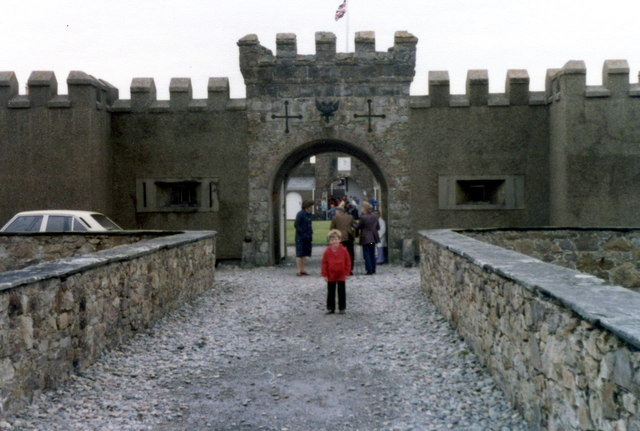

- Location within Gwynedd

General information
- Location: Dinlle Peninsula, Llanwnda, Gwynedd, Wales
- Coordinates: 53.12239°N 4.33269°W
- Completed: 1775
- Cost: £30,000

Design and construction
- Architect: Thomas Wynn, 1st Baron Newborough

Fort Belan (alternative: Belan Fort; pronounced: Bell-ann) is a coastal fortress in North Wales. It is located opposite Abermenai Point, at the south-western end of the Menai Strait, on the coast of Gwynedd, in the parish of Llanwnda. Situated at the tip of the Dinlle Peninsula, the windblown, north-westernmost point of the Welsh mainland, the fort is cut off twice a day by the incoming tide.

== History ==
The fort was built in 1775 for a reported cost of £30,000 (equivalent to £4.5 million in 2023), by Thomas Wynn, then MP for Caernarfonshire and later to become Lord Newborough. He was worried about the vulnerability of Britain's coastline to attack, particularly because of the recently begun American War of Independence. Fort Belan was the only purpose-built fort of the American Revolution on the eastern side of the Atlantic Ocean. It guards a narrow passage of 35 m (115 ft) width.

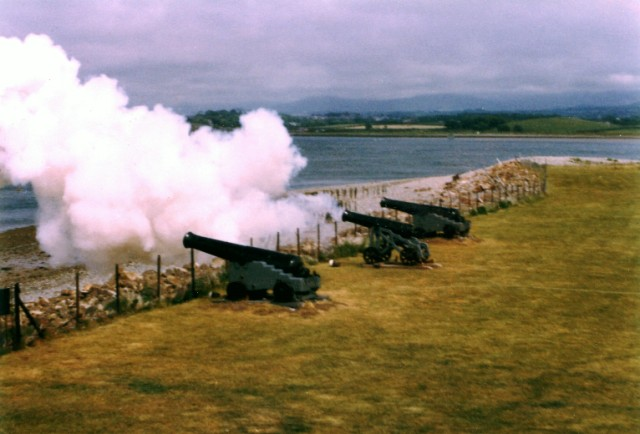
Cannons firing.

In the late 1780s, the barracks were used to ward off raiding American privateers from the Irish Sea but despite its military history, "no shots have been fired in anger from the fort". In the 1820s, the Wynn family turned it into a private fort for themselves, adding a small harbour for Spencer Wynn's steam yacht. Major construction works took place between 1824 and 1826. The watchtower was built in the 1890s by Freddie Wynn, and it housed a telescope.

In 1907, Sir Ralph Payne-Gallwey described seeing a dock, workshops for repairing vessels, marine storehouses, winches, and cranes. During World War II, the fort was again used for military purposes as the base for the Home Guard and two rescue launches. In the 1950s it was owned by Colonel Robert Vaughan Wynn. The Wynn family sold the property in 1992 to the Blundells as a base for marine biology exploration. In 1996 the fort was reclassified as a Grade I listed building.

== Architecture ==
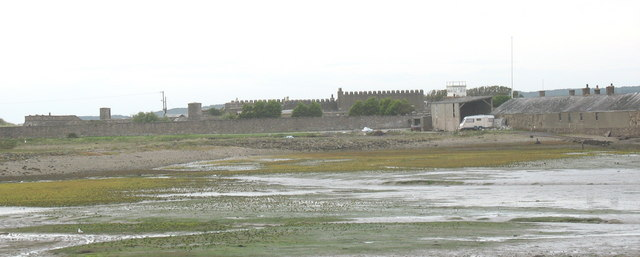
Fort Belan

The fort's innermost buildings are slightly taller than the 20-foot (6.1 m) stone walls. In the centre of the fort is a sheltered quadrangle; at one time, there were peacocks there. Fortified towers are located at either end of the courtyard. Each of the towers displays the two-headed eagle of the first Lord Newborough. Small two-storey houses that were used as officer and privates' quarters line the flanks, commodious barracks for the Caernarvonshire county militia. Approximately 24 cannons form a gun battery along the walls. One of the inner corridors is said to be the haunt of a phantom nursemaid.

== Present use ==
Fort Belan formerly housed a maritime museum and a pottery, before being re-purposed as a self-catering holiday complex. Notably Princess Margaret stayed at the fort for the investiture of Prince Charles in 1969.
