= Newborough, Anglesey =

Village in Anglesey, Wales

Coordinates: 53.16479°N 4.35900°W

Newborough: Welsh: Niwbwrch
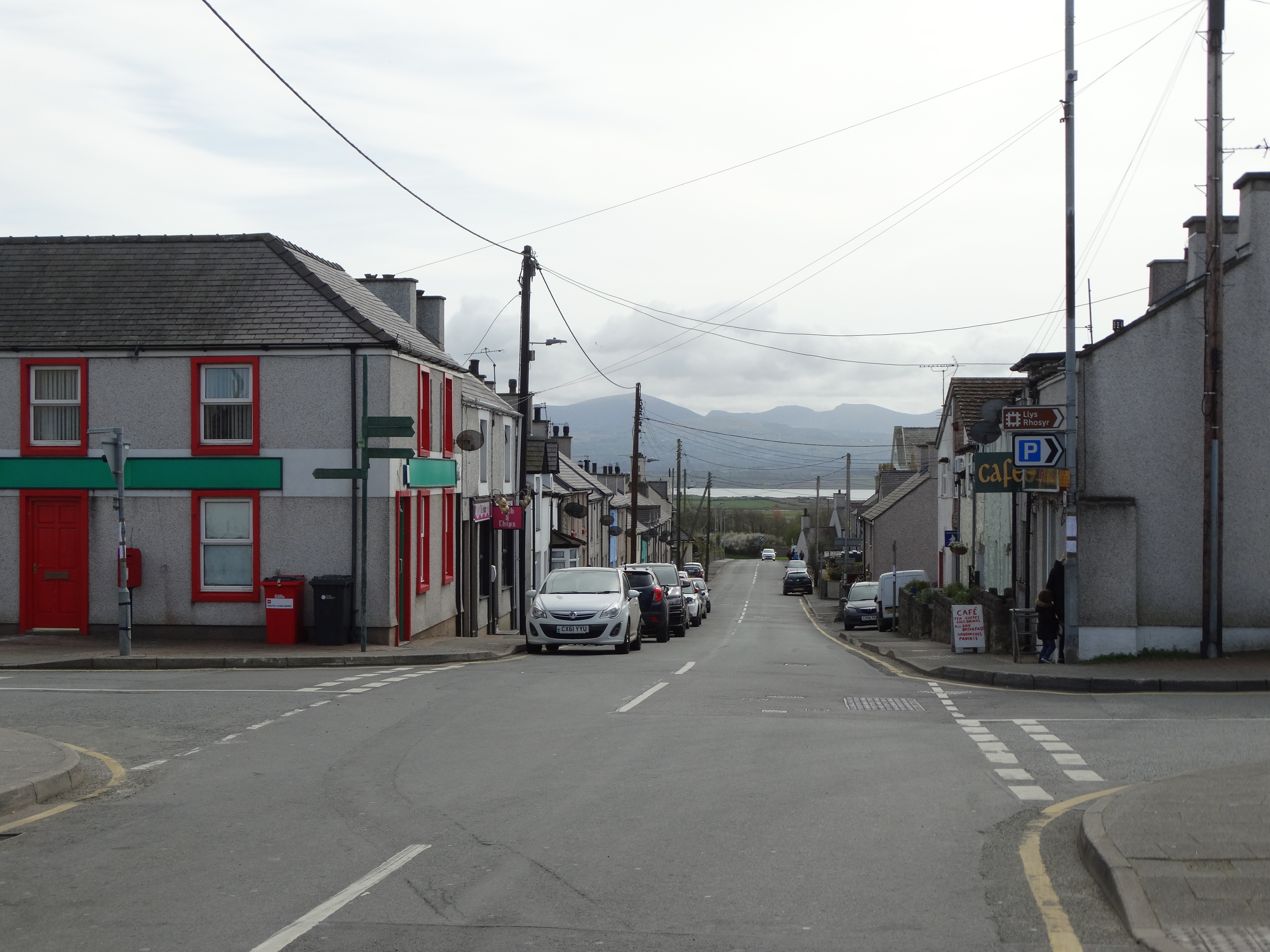
- Chapel Street with Snowdonia in the background

- Location within Anglesey
- Population: 839 (2021)
- OS grid reference: SH425655
- Community: Rhosyr
- Principal area: Isle of Anglesey
- Preserved county: Gwynedd
- Country: Wales
- Sovereign state: United Kingdom
- Post town: LLANFAIRPWLLGWYNGYLL
- Postcode district: LL61
- Dialling code: 01248
- Police: North Wales
- Fire: North Wales
- Ambulance: Welsh
- UK Parliament: Ynys Môn
- Senedd Cymru – Welsh Parliament: Bangor Conwy Môn

Newborough (Welsh: Niwbwrch) is a village in the southern corner of the Isle of Anglesey in Wales. It is a part of the Bro Aberffraw electoral ward; to the northwest is Aberffraw, and to the northeast is Llanfairpwll. There is a church in the village, a primary school, and a public institute. Nearby is the Newborough Warren, a forest, beach, and public nature reserve.

Until 1984 it was a community. Today it is part of Rhosyr.

== History ==
=== Medieval Rhos Vair ===
In medieval Gwynedd, Rhosyr was the royal demesne (Welsh: maerdref) and seat of governance for the commote of Menai. The location was a residence of the Princes of Gwynedd. There is a ruined court building of Llys Rhosyr (Rhosyr court) on the outskirts of the present village of Newborough; the royal court (Welsh: llys brenhinol) dates from 1237 and was in use for less than a century. The building was the inspiration and model for the reconstruction of a court at St. Fagans Museum, Cardiff.

Newborough gained its current name when the town was founded by citizens of Llanfaes in eastern Anglesey. The inhabitants were evicted in 1294 from east Anglesey to the west of the island by Edward I, to promote the new port of Beaumaris. The town was established as a "new borough" and gained its charter in 1303. Before the changes, the town was called Rhôs Vair. The charter was renewed by successive kings between the 14th and 19th centuries. During the age of Edward I (c. 1300), the town was promoted to the status of a corporation giving it a guild mercatory amongst other privileges, this status was confirmed once more during the reign of Edward III (first year of his reign, 1327), King of England. During the later part of this period, the town's population was around 93 houses around the royal manor. The Crown of England had a steward in this district who received a salary of 10 pounds per year. The court at Llys Rhosyr was still in use during this period, as it was noted that repairs were being done to the buildings. Also, during the 14th century, one of the leading Welsh poets of the Middle Ages, Dafydd ap Gwilym wrote a cywydd praising Newborough for its generous hospitality, especially towards poets, describing it as both a sanctuary and a place of joyful abundance, symbolised through vivid images of wine, mead, and song.

During the medieval period, the local landed gentry in the royal borough had appointed an individual to the role of a Burgess, that person was given privileges from the Crown and would negotiate the Royal charter with the King of England in his parliament. Around the year 1489, during the reign of Henry VII of England, the county of Anglesey's court sessions (assizes) were moved to the town after 250 years in Beaumaris Castle, thus giving Newborough a member of parliament and making it the county town of Anglesey. It was Richard ap Rhydderch ap Myfyrian who represented Newborough in British Parliament during the reign of Henry VIII, and John ap Robert Llwyd during the reign of Edward VI. Then in 1550, the main court of Anglesey and all related county business was returned to Beaumaris.

=== Modern Newborough ===
Newborough's warren was home to a thriving marram grass industry; this grass was used to produce matting, nets, and rope. In 1814, Newborough's status as a Royal chartered borough of King George III was abolished after the resignation of the town mayor. The ending of the town's charter affected the people negatively and forced the closure of common land for grazing animals, and the town fell into a state of "severe deprivation", and the land was taken by the crown. The neighbouring town of Llanddwyn was incorporated into Newborough. During those years, a famous resident was John Morgan, a blind musician who played the crwth in the village.

== The village today ==
=== Church ===
In the village is St Peter's Church. The place of worship dates from the 14th century, with additions in the 15th and 16th centuries. The building was restored in 1850 and extended in 1886.

=== School ===
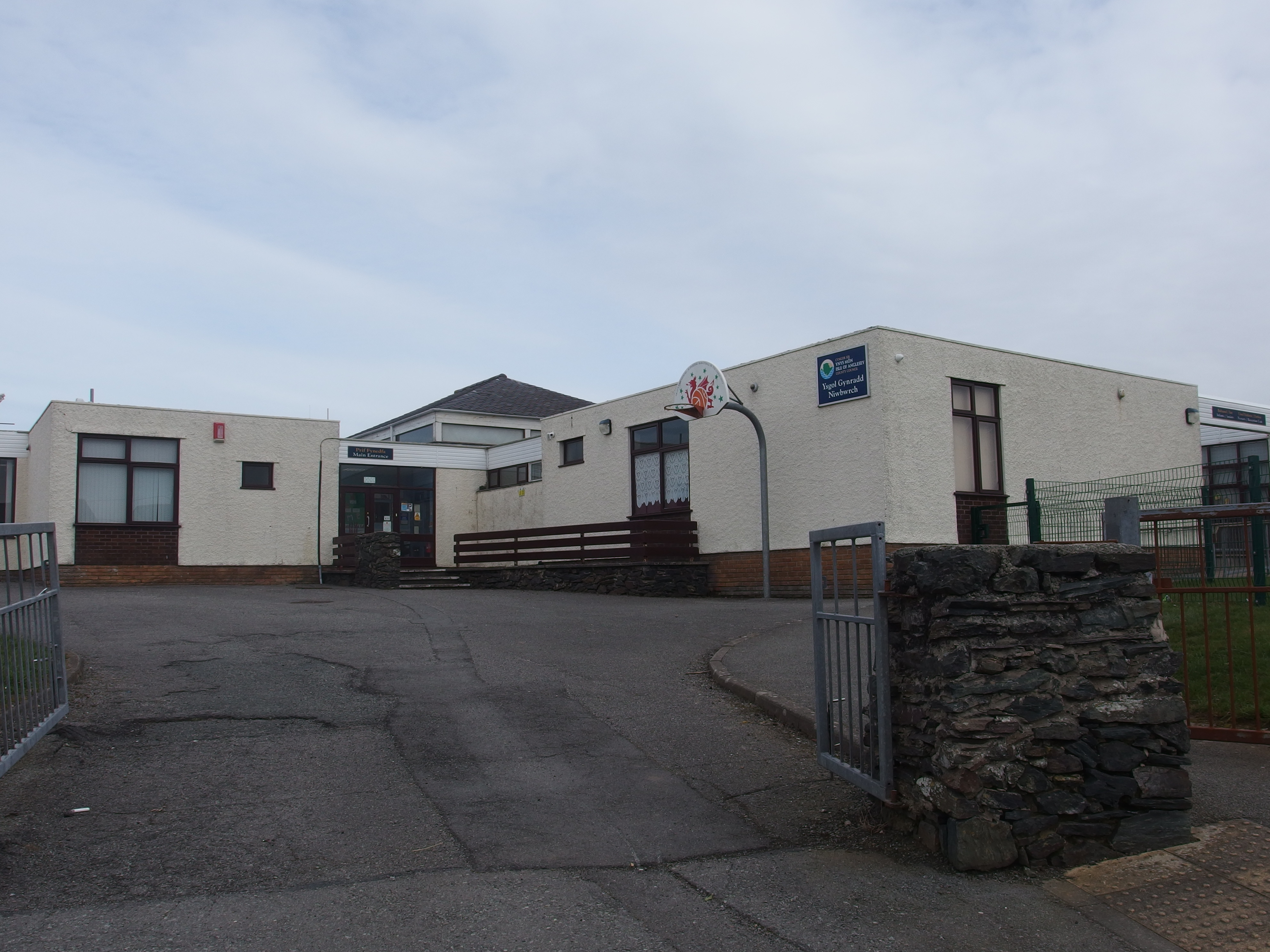
Newborough Primary School

In 2019, the village opened a new Welsh-speaking primary school, Ysgol Santes Dwynwen.

=== Prichard Jones institute ===
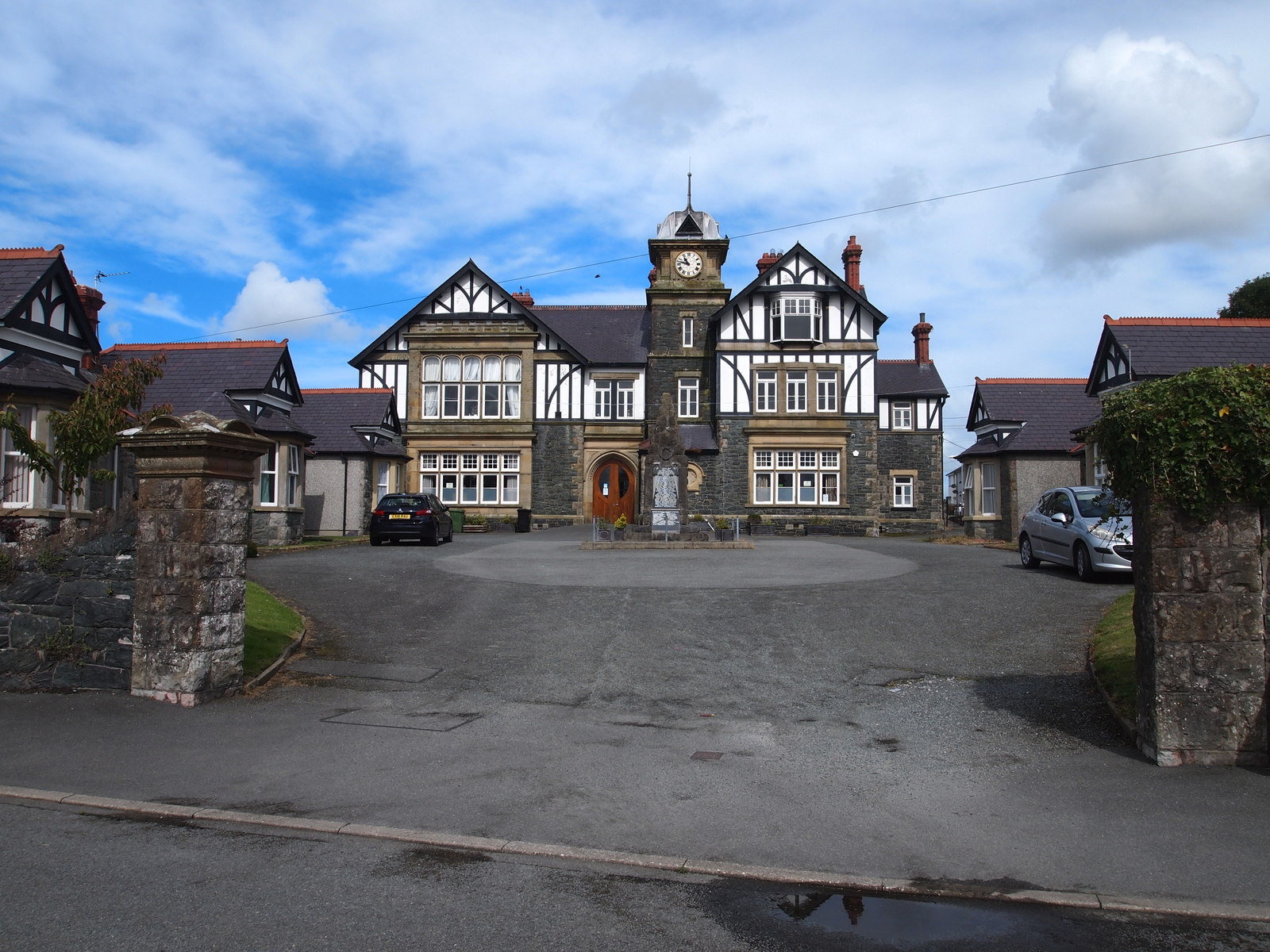
Pritchard-Jones institute, built 1905 in Newborough

The Prichard Jones Institute was built in 1902–1905. ("Institute" is a common Welsh term for a community hall: y stiwt.) The Neo-Tudor institute with a clock tower was designed by Roland Lloyd Jones and completed for £20,000 (equivalent to £2,800,000 in 2024). The Institute appeared on the BBC2 programme, Restoration, in 2006. There are six single-storey cottage homes attached to the institute; they were gifted to the village by Sir John Prichard-Jones, after whom the building was named; he was born in Newborough. Sir John served as an apprentice draper in Caernarfon, then moved to London to work at Dickins, Smith and Stevens. Pritchard-Jones was eventually appointed as chairman of the Dickins & Jones department store in London, to which he gave his name.

=== Recreation ===
The village and its environs provide walking opportunities for visitors, including at Newborough Warren, one of the largest areas of dunes in the British Isles, and Newborough Forest, a 2,000-acre (800 ha) woodland. Much of the area around Newborough is a nature reserve, popular with those interested in geology, botany, birds, and other wildlife.

There is a large sandy Blue Flag beach at Llanddwyn, which provides access to Ynys Llanddwyn. On the island are the ruins of a church which is said to have been dedicated to the Welsh Saint Dwynwen in the year 465. She was the patron of the Welsh Valentines Day (Welsh: Dydd Santes Dwynwen). The church was built in the 16th century on a mile-long promontory on the beach. The beach is also a popular kitesurfing location.

Just outside the village is Tacla Taid ("Grandpa's stuff"), the Anglesey Transport and Agriculture Museum, the largest of its kind in Wales.

=== Demographics ===
The village is in the Bro Aberffraw electoral ward on Anglesey, the area represents the south-west of the island. Then, Newborough is in the community (and former electoral ward) of Rhosyr, which had a population of 2,169 in 2001, increasing to 2,226 at the 2011 census.

Historically the population of the village grew from 599 in 1801 to 934 in 1971. By 1831, there were 187 males over 20 years old, of these, 62 were farmworkers. In 2011, the village had a population of 892 of whom 68% were born in Wales. As of the 2021 census, Newborough has a population of 839.

== People from Newborough ==
Today, the village gives its name to the Peerage of Ireland as Baron Newborough of the Welsh Wynn family. Other famous people from the village include:

- Sir John Prichard-Jones, 1st Baronet Pritchard-Jones (1841–1917), business partner in the London department store Dickins & Jones.
- William Jones (1842–1907), master mariner, industrialist and civic leader, settled in Tasmania, Australia.
- Grace Wynne Griffith (1888–1963) novelist writing in Welsh, joint prize winner at the National Eisteddfod in 1934.

== Movies and television filmed in Newborough ==
- Coast, BBC television series
- Half Light, 2006 horror film starring Demi Moore.
- Clash Of The Titans, 2010 historical fantasy film starring Sam Worthington.
- House of the Dragon, 2022 Fantasy television drama, prequel to Game of Thrones.

== Photos of Newborough ==
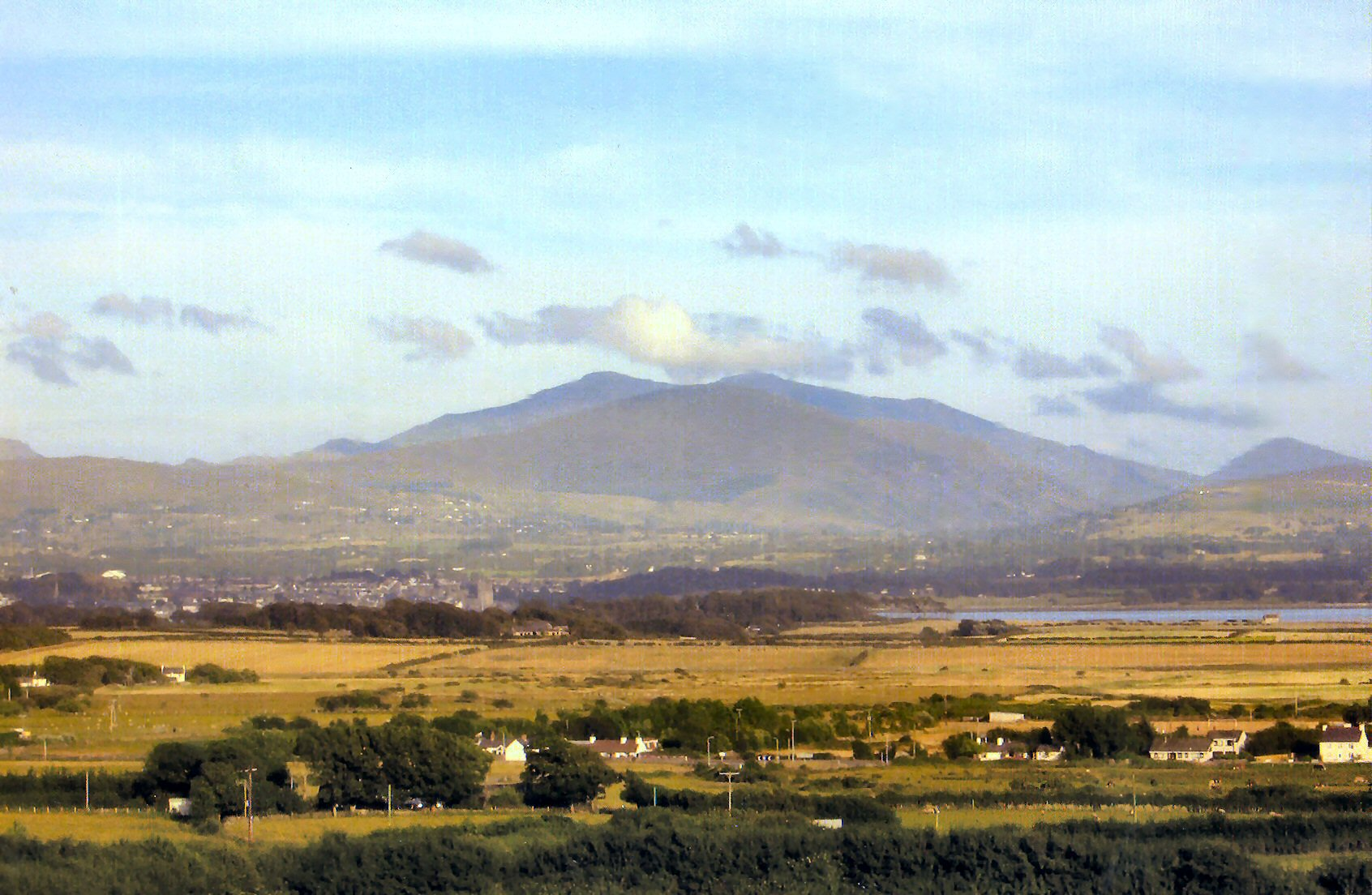
Snowdon and Snowdonia from Hendre Fawr farm

Newborough beach car park

Kitesurfing on Newborough beach

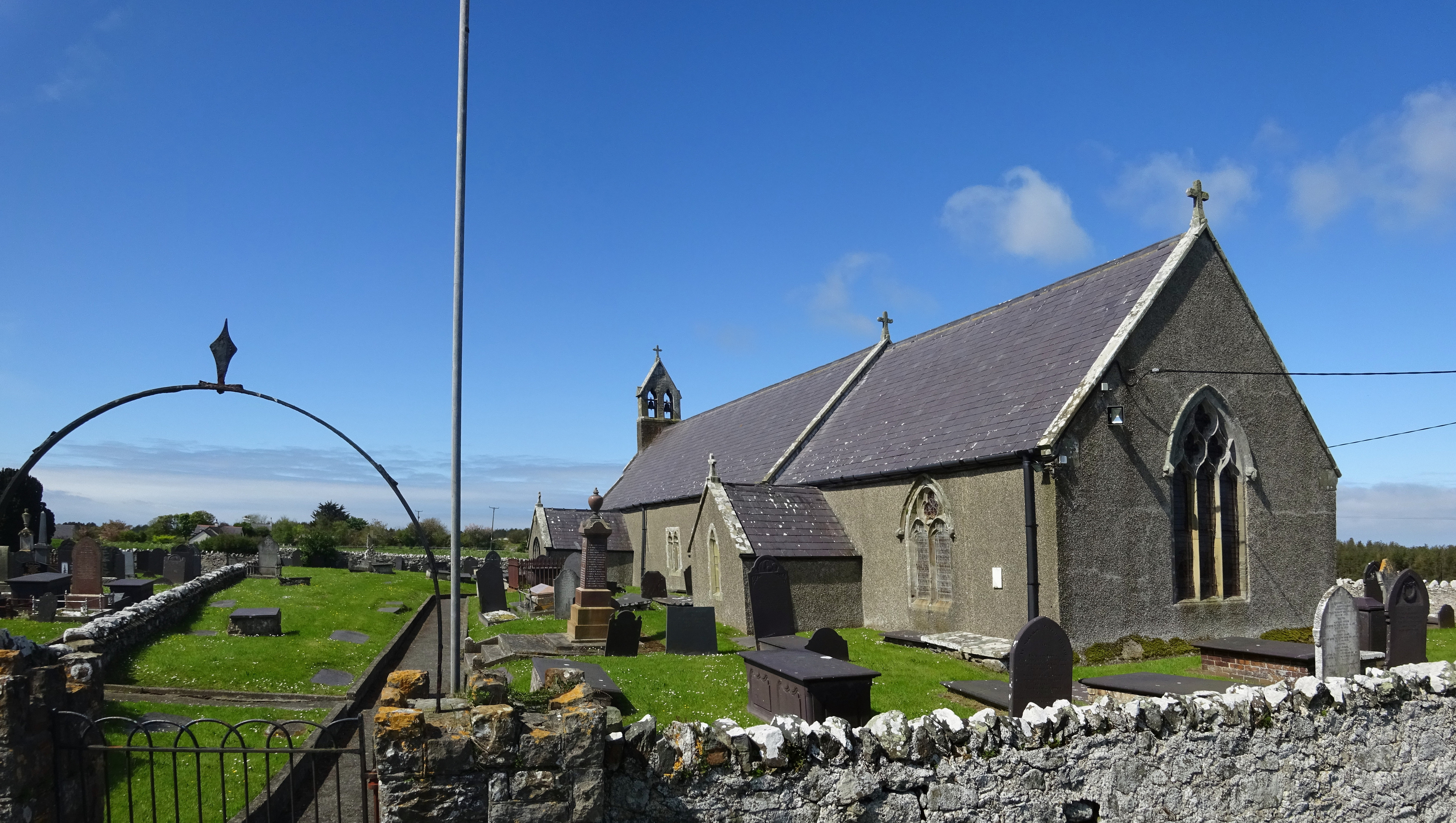
Gateway leading to St Peter's Church
