= Llys Rhosyr =

Archaeological site in Anglesey, Wales

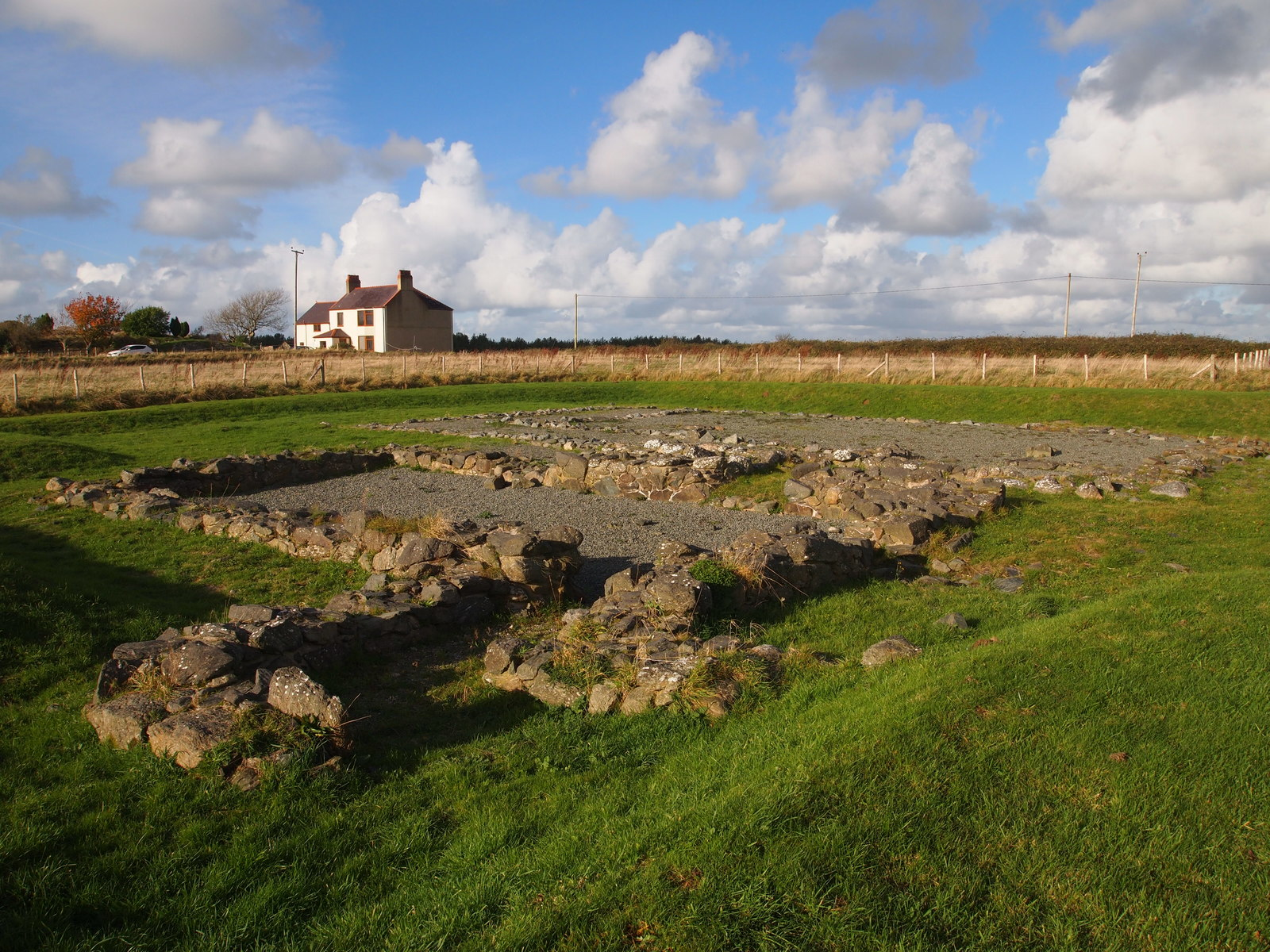

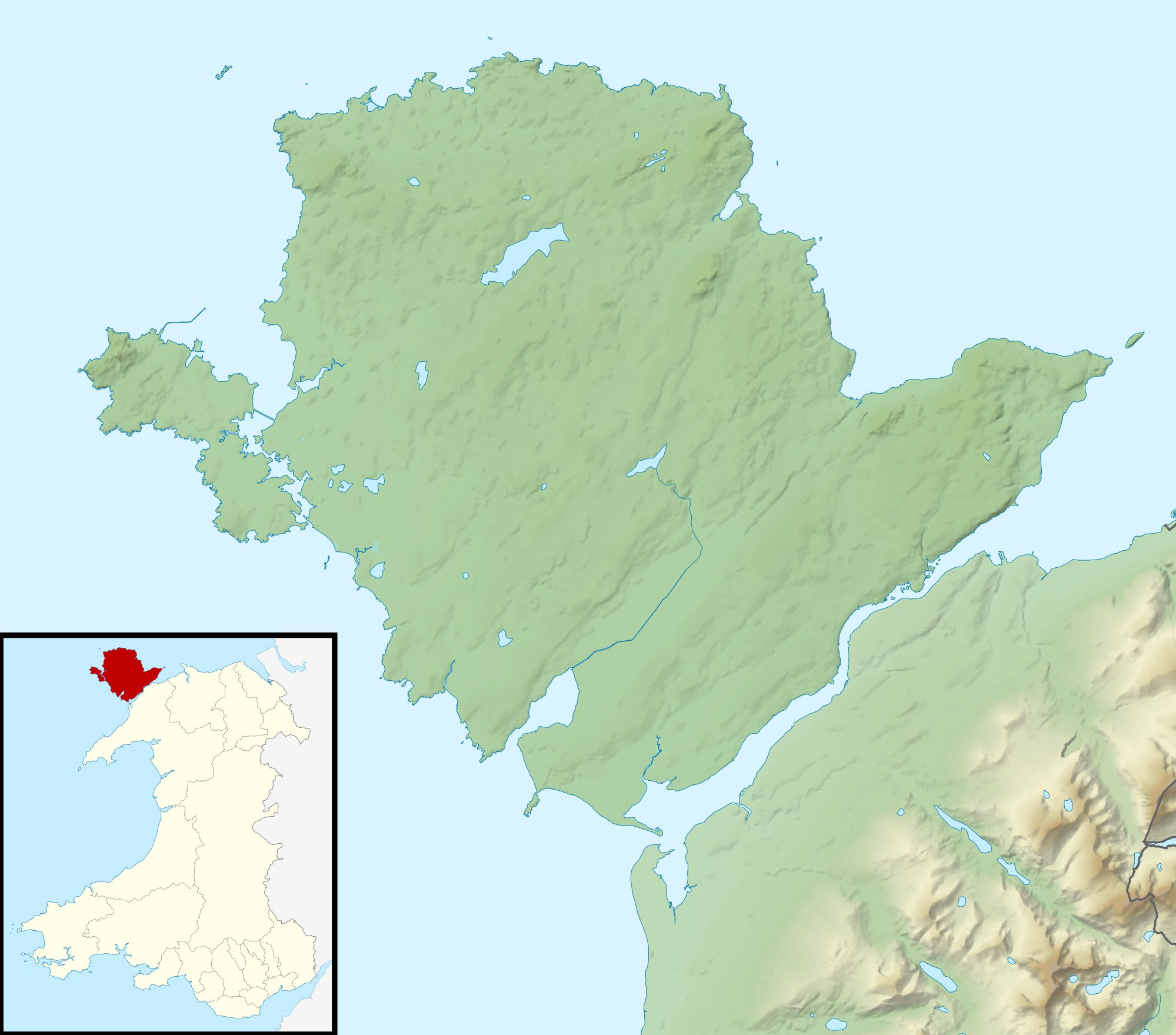
- Location within Anglesey
- 53.1619°N 4.3661°W
- Type: Royal court
- Location: Newborough, Anglesey

Site notes
- Governing body: CADW

Scheduled monument
- Official name: Llys Rhosyr
- Designated: 20 March 1997
- Reference no.: AN129

Llys Rhosyr, also known as "Cae Llys", is an archaeological site near Newborough in Anglesey; the ruins of a pre-Edwardian commotal court.

== History and description ==
The Welsh word llys originally referred to an enclosed open-air space but gradually took on the meaning of a place where legal proceedings took place and was gradually extended to refer to royal "courts".

Llys Rhosyr was a commotal centre before Edward I of England's conquest of Wales and debate now surrounds the former use of the Rhosyr site. Archaeologists at Gwynedd Archaeological Trust consider it to have been a royal home and have established an exhibition in the Pritchard-Jones Institute in the village on their findings supporting this theory. Excavations reveal that the enclosure had a hall, accommodation and storage barns, originally built in stone and wood. The buildings may have occupied an area as much as 450 by 300 feet (137 m × 91 m).

A fierce sandstorm in the winter of 1332 buried the site and much of the surrounding area, which may have caused the decline in activity during the 14th century revealed by the archaeological investigation. When Henry Rowlands was writing in the early 18th century, the sands had uncovered parts of the walls, but no significant remains were visible, though he comments that local people were aware of the location and nature of the remains, a site sometimes known as 'llys' or 'cae'r llys' ('the field of the court' in English).

From 1992 it was excavated by the Gwynedd Archaeological Trust and was opened to the public for the first time in 1995. What remains is the outlines of the walls, around only a quarter of which are exposed, including the main surrounding wall and foundations and lower walls of three large buildings, possibly the hall, a chamber and storage barns. Many artifacts were recovered from the site, including pottery and silverware indicating use by people of a high social status, as well as lead fishing weights. It is the only royal court of Gwynedd whose site has so far been excavated.

In 2023 the site was bought by Cadw, the Welsh government's historic environment agency. Llys Rhosyr is a scheduled monument.

== Reconstruction at St Fagans ==
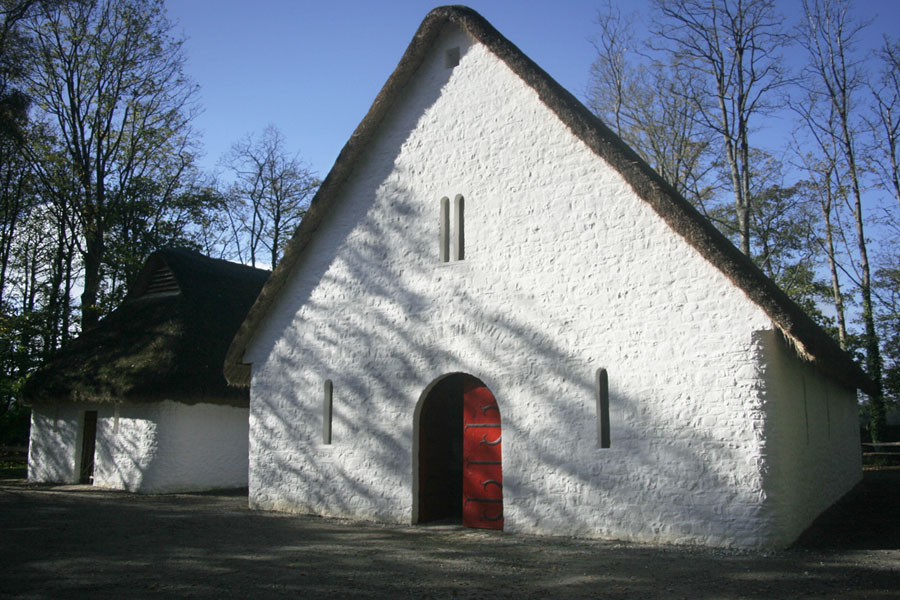
Reconstruction of Llys Llewelyn at St Fagan's

A reconstruction of the Great Hall of Llys Rhosyr was built as part of the redevelopment of St Fagan's National History Museum, Cardiff, using a grant from the Heritage Lottery Fund awarded in 2012. It was proposed that the building, with its 9-metre-high (30 ft) walls, would be able to accommodate groups overnight on completion. The hall, now referred to as "Llys Llewelyn", and the nearby chamber were modelled on the two most thoroughly excavated buildings on the original site.

The building was opened to the public in October 2018 and the first group of visitors to spend the night were children and teachers from Ysgol Santes Dwynwen School in Newborough, Anglesey, in May 2019.
