= Dickins & Jones =

Former department store in London

Dickins & Jones was a high-quality department store in London, England, which traded between 1835 and 2007, although tracing its origins to 1790. From 1835, the main store was in London's Regent Street. In its final years the store had branches at Epsom, Richmond, and Milton Keynes.

The name is now a fashion brand of House of Fraser.

== History ==
In 1790, Dickins and Smith opened a shop at 54, Oxford Street, at the sign of the Golden Lion. In 1830, the shop was renamed "Dickins, Sons and Stevens", and in 1835 it moved its premises to Numbers 232 and 234 in the newly built Regent Street. In the 1890s the business changed its name to "Dickins & Jones", when John Jones (as he then was) became a partner.

In 1914, the business was bought by Harrods, as its first acquisition beyond its own original store. In 1919, the Dickins & Jones store acquired a new site at 224-244 Regent Street, a short distance from the old one, and in 1922 it moved into a new building designed for it by Sir Henry Tanner. In 1959, Harrods was itself bought by House of Fraser, but both Harrods and its subsidiary Dickins & Jones continued to trade under their existing names. A new store was opened on George Street, Richmond in 1969.

In the summer of 2005 House of Fraser announced that the Regent Street store would close, stating that its high rental value had made the store unprofitable since 2002, and the closure took place on 14 January 2006. The building was sold to Shearer Property Group and Delancey Estates for redevelopment into shop units with apartments and offices above. In October 2006 it was revealed that the new building was to have a glass extension with terraces built on top of the former store to make an 18,000 sq ft (1,700 m^{2}) upmarket restaurant and that the first, ground and basement levels would house H&M and Nokia.

Following the closure of the Regent Street store, branches of Dickins & Jones at Epsom, Richmond, and Milton Keynes continued to trade under that name until 2007, when they were rebranded as House of Fraser stores. However, the Dickins & Jones name continues to be used by House of Fraser as one of its in-house brands for women's fashion wear.
