= Newborough Forest =

Forest in Anglesey, North Wales

Coordinates: 53.15737°N 4.37668°W

Newborough Forest (Welsh: Coedwig Niwbwrch) is a forest to the west of Newborough, Anglesey, North Wales.

It is one of the most important red squirrel conservation sites in the United Kingdom. It appears increasingly likely that there are now only 500 red squirrels in Wales and numbers are continuing to decline.

The whole area was mainly shifting sand dunes prior to 1947 when afforestation began. During the late seventies and eighties there were concerns that the water levels within the forest and within neighbouring warren were falling, with the result that winter flooding was not to the same depth and that dune slack pools were drying out sooner.

Proposals were put forward in 2004 to remove large parts of the forest. The local community and conservation groups objected and in 2008 a public consultation was held into the future management of the Newborough woodland.

Newborough Forest is a major tourist attraction, with over 319,000 people visiting the forest in 2015.
