= Llanfaelog =

Village and community in Anglesey, Wales

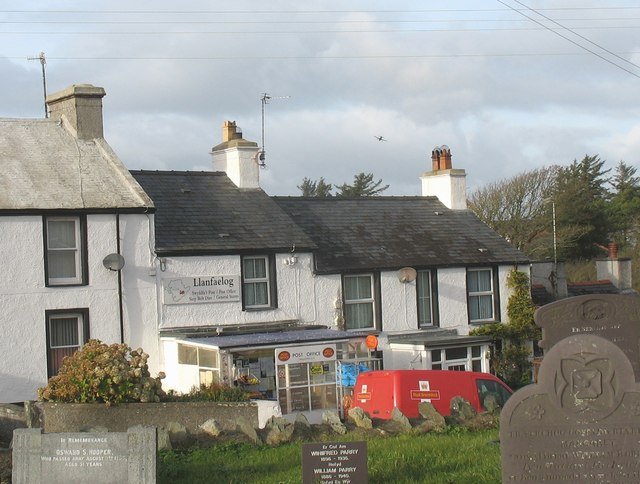
- Post office

- Location within Anglesey
- Population: 1,758 (2011)
- Community: Llanfaelog
- Principal area: Anglesey
- Preserved county: Gwynedd
- Country: Wales
- Sovereign state: United Kingdom
- Post town: TY CROES
- Postcode district: LL63
- Post town: RHOSNEIGR
- Postcode district: LL64
- Police: North Wales
- Fire: North Wales
- Ambulance: Welsh
- UK Parliament: Ynys Môn
- Senedd Cymru – Welsh Parliament: Bangor Conwy Môn
- List of places UK Wales Anglesey 53.228°N 4.493°W Map of the community

Llanfaelog (Welsh pronunciation) is a village and community in western Anglesey, Wales. It is situated some 13 kilometres south-east of Holyhead and 22 kilometres west of the city of Bangor. At the 2001 census, it had a population of 1,679, increasing to 1,758 at the 2011 Census. The community includes Rhosneigr, Bryn Du, and Pencarnisiog. The Community Councillors information can be seen on this link.The population of the village itself is less than 400.

== Geography ==
Llanfaelog is bordered by Llanfihangel yn Nhowyn to the north, Bryngwran to the northeast, Pencarnisiog to the east, Bryn Du to the southeast, Aberffraw to the south, and Rhosneigr to the west. The main railway line to Holyhead passes close to the village, between it and the coast which is about a mile to the southwest. The A4080 road branches at Llanfaelog; a loop goes northwest to Rhosneigr railway station, curves to the left to reach Rhosneigr on the coast and then continues round Llyn Maelog to rejoin the direct branch of the road half a mile south of the village of Llanfaelog.

== The church ==
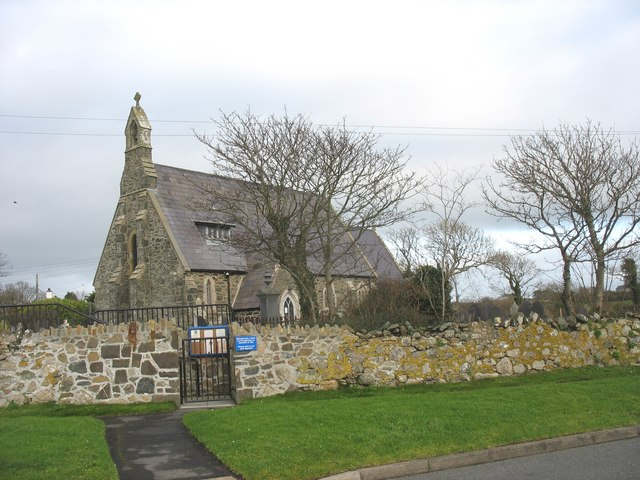
Eglwys Maelog Sant

The church of St Maelog was built in 1848 to replace an older church on a different site within the churchyard. It is a Grade II listed building, being listed on the basis that it is a competently designed, Gothic Revival church, and forms an appealing group of buildings with the adjoining Rectory and National School. The architect was H. Kennedy of Bangor,

== Transport ==
The village is easily reachable by both car and train. It is found on the A4080, under 3 miles (5 km) from both the historic A5 and the newer dual carriageway A55 "North Wales Expressway". It is equidistant between the railway stations at Ty Croes and Rhosneigr, being a couple of minutes drive from them both. In addition there is a limited bus service to the county town of Llangefni.
