= Engedi =

Engedi and similar can also mean:

- Ein Gedi, an oasis in Israel
- Ein Gedi (kibbutz), a kibbutz in Israel
- Engedi, Anglesey is a village southeast of Bryngwran, Wales, named after the Biblical place
