= Aberffraw (disambiguation) =

Aberffraw is village and community in Anglesey, Wales, UK.

Aberffraw may also refer to:

- Aberffraw, an electoral ward in Gwynedd prior to 1996
- Aberffraw cantref, a medieval area of administration of Anglesey
- Bro Aberffraw, an electoral ward of Anglesey, created in 2012
- House of Aberffraw, Welsh Royal family (Dynasty)
