= Death of Gareth Williams =

Death of Welsh mathematician and employee of GCHQ in 2010

Coordinates: 51.49016°N 0.14553°W

Gareth Williams
- Undated handout photo of Williams
- Born: Gareth Wyn Williams; 26 September 1978; Valley, Anglesey, Wales
- Died: 16 August 2010 (aged 31); Pimlico, London, England
- Cause of death: Unlawfully killed by suffocation; Suspected to be accidental by the Metropolitan Police
- Body discovered: 23 August 2010
- Resting place: Ynys Wen Cemetery, Valley, Anglesey.
- Occupation: Secret Intelligence Service employee
- Known for: Unusual death

Gareth Wyn Williams (26 September 1978 – c. 16 August 2010) was a Welsh mathematician and Junior Analyst for Government Communications Headquarters (GCHQ) on secondment to the Secret Intelligence Service (SIS or MI6) who was found dead in suspicious circumstances in Pimlico, London, on 23 August 2010, at a flat used to house Security Service staff. The inquest found that his death was "unnatural and likely to have been criminally mediated." A subsequent Metropolitan Police re-investigation concluded that Williams's death was "probably an accident".

Two senior British police sources have said some of Williams's work concerned Russia, and one confirmed reports that he had been helping the US National Security Agency trace international money-laundering routes that are used by organised crime groups including Moscow-based mafia cells.

== Background ==
Originally from Valley, Anglesey, Wales, Williams, who spoke Welsh as a first language, began studying mathematics part-time at Bangor University, while still attending his secondary school, Ysgol Uwchradd Bodedern, and graduated with a first-class degree at age 17. He gained a PhD at the University of Manchester, but after failing an exam in a subsequent post-graduate course at St Catharine's College, Cambridge, he dropped out of academia. He took up employment with GCHQ in Cheltenham in 2001, renting a room for nearly a decade in Prestbury, Gloucestershire. Reportedly an intensely private man and a keen cyclist, Williams was due to return to Cheltenham on 3 September 2010, after spending a year in London, following his annual leave.

== Death ==
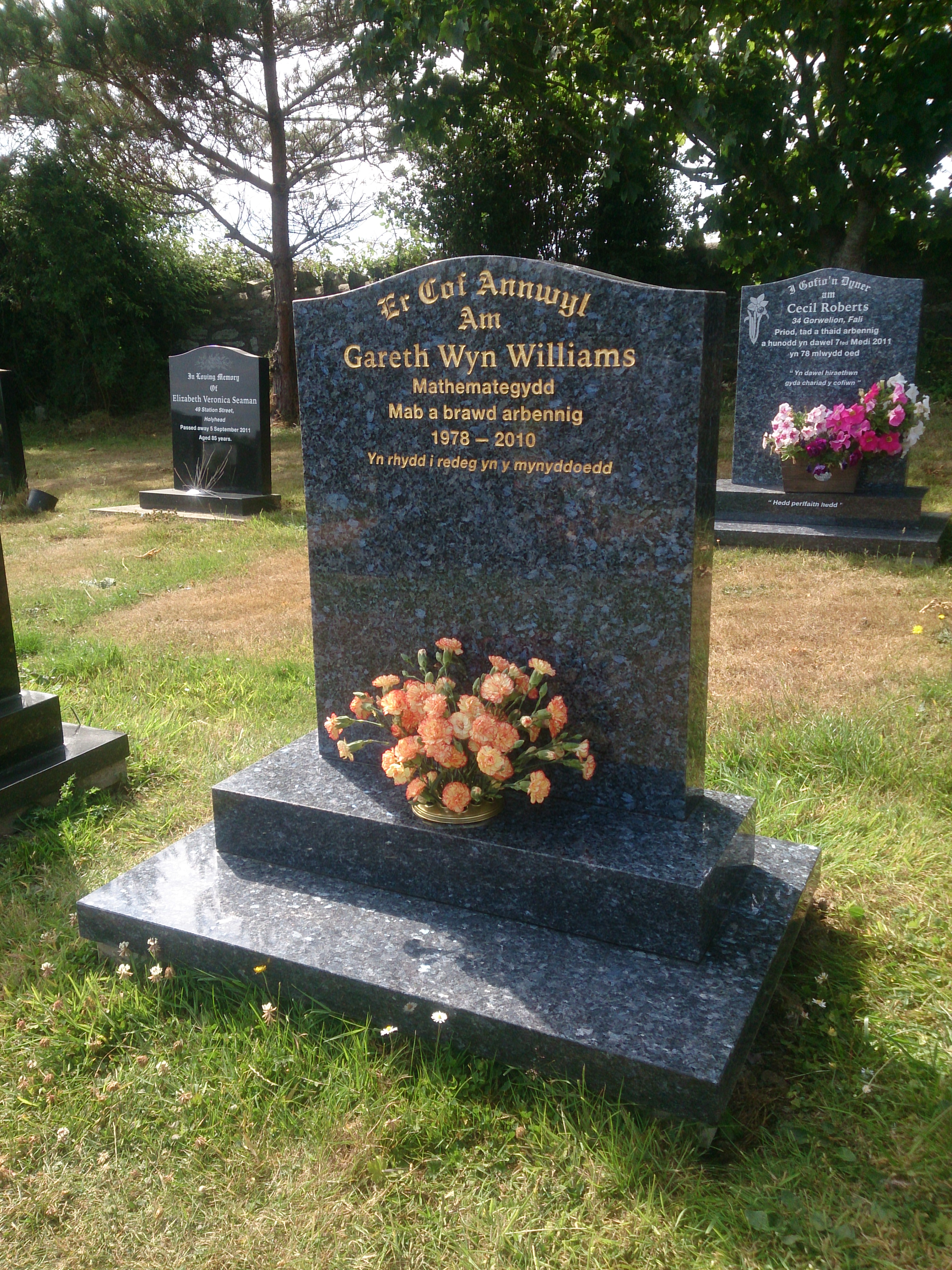
Gareth Williams' grave in Ynys Wen Cemetery, Valley, Anglesey. Headstone reads: "In loving memory of Gareth Wyn Williams, mathematician, special son and brother, 1978–2010. Free to run in the mountains."

Police visited Williams's home during the afternoon of Monday 23 August 2010, as a "welfare check" after colleagues noted he had been out of contact for several days. His naked, decomposing remains were found in the bath of the main bedroom's en-suite bathroom, inside a red sports bag that was padlocked from the outside. The local police had gained entry into the top floor flat at 36 Alderney Street, Pimlico at around 16:48; on examination of the bag, the premises were declared a crime scene. His family alleged that crucial DNA was interfered with and that fingerprints left at the scene were removed as part of a cover-up. Inconclusive fragments of DNA components from at least two other individuals were found on the bag. A forensic examination of Williams's flat has concluded that there was no sign of forced entry or of DNA that pointed to a third party present at the time of his death.

Scotland Yard's inquiry also found no evidence of Williams's fingerprints on the padlock of the bag or the rim of the bath, which the coroner said supported her assertion of "third-party involvement" in the death. Metropolitan Police deputy assistant commissioner Martin Hewitt said it was theoretically possible for Williams to lower himself into the bag without touching the rim of the bath. A key to the padlock was inside the bag, underneath his body.

Williams was buried at Ynys Wen cemetery in Valley, Anglesey, on 26 September 2010, following a private funeral service at Bethel Chapel in Holyhead attended by his family, friends, former colleagues in the intelligence services, and also by the head of SIS, Sir John Sawers.

== Investigation ==
Williams's date of death was estimated to have been in the early hours of 16 August, one week before he was found.

Soon after the investigation started, the heads of the Secret Intelligence Service and Metropolitan Police met to discuss how the police would handle the investigation in light of the top secret nature of Williams's work, and who would lead the investigation. Williams had recently qualified for operational deployment, and had worked with U.S. National Security Agency and FBI agents. The U.S. State Department asked that no details of Williams's work should emerge at the inquest. The foreign secretary, William Hague, signed a public-interest immunity certificate authorising the withholding from the inquest of details of Williams's work and U.S. joint operations.

After launching an investigation, coroner Fiona Wilcox said that there were no injuries on his body and no signs that he had been involved in a struggle; his body was also free of alcohol and common recreational drugs. The Metropolitan Police considered his death "suspicious and unexplained". The FBI also conducted their own investigation into the case.

In December 2010, police released further details, stating that Williams had occasionally spent between 30 minutes to an hour on bondage websites, but added there was no evidence that he was "obsessed" with bondage and no other pornography was found. Williams's wardrobe included £25,000 of "high-end" women's clothing.

The landlady of the annex flat he had rented in Cheltenham for 10 years said she and her husband had once found him, three years before his death, shouting for help, with his hands tied to his bedposts. He said he was seeing if he could get free. They cut him free, believing it was "sexual rather than escapology".

An expert brought in to examine the bag in which Williams's body was found concluded that Williams could not have locked it. A police spokesperson stated that "If he was alive, he got into it voluntarily or, if not, he was unconscious and placed in the bag."

The heating in Williams's apartment was found to be turned on. It has been suggested an elevated temperature inside the apartment would have sped up the decomposition of Williams's body.

Subsequently, the police released an E-FIT photo of two people they were seeking, who were seen to enter the communal entrance of his home in June or July 2010.

== Coroner's inquest ==
Anthony O'Toole, the lawyer for the family, said at the coroner's inquest in March 2012 that a second person was either present when Williams died, or someone broke in afterwards and stole items. There was no forensic evidence to support this view. No sign of forced entry could be found, but it was also noted that the door and locks had been removed by the time police experts had become involved.

DNA found on Williams's hand turned out to be contamination from one of the forensic scientists and the police determined that a Mediterranean couple they had been seeking had nothing to do with the inquiry. LGC, the forensic company, apologized that the error had inflicted such pain on the family, caused by the incorrect data entry of a numerical code.

Evidence at the inquest showed that it would have been virtually impossible for Williams to have locked himself in the bag. Two experts were unable to lock themselves in a similar bag despite making 400 attempts to do so, although one stated there was a small chance Williams had managed the feat. Pathologist Richard Shepherd stated it was more likely that Williams was alive when he got into the bag, due to the difficulty of arranging a corpse in the position Williams's body was found in. Another pathologist stated that Williams would have been overcome by hypercapnia, elevated carbon dioxide levels, after only two or three minutes in the bag. There were no gloves found in the bag and no fingerprints on either the padlock or the bag.

Williams's family said they believed that "a member of some agency specialising in the dark arts of the secret services" was involved in his death.

Fiona Wilcox, the coroner, said that she would "follow the evidence" wherever it led. Fiona Wilcox was also the coroner for the death of William S Broeksmit who was an auditor at Deutsche Bank at the time the bank was underwriting the Danske Bank/Estonia Russian money laundering scandal.

Journalist Duncan Campbell reported that the inquest evidence indicated Williams was one of a team of intelligence officers sent to penetrate US and UK hacking networks. He had attended the 2010 Black Hat Briefings and DEF CON conferences. He had started with SIS in London in spring 2009, and after taking a number of training courses started on "active operational work". A few months before his death, he asked to return to GCHQ as he disliked the "rat race, flash car competitions and post-work drinking culture" at SIS and as a keen cyclist and walker wanted to go back to the countryside, and was due to return in September.

=== Inquest verdict ===
The coroner found in a narrative verdict that Williams's death was "unnatural and likely to have been criminally mediated". The coroner was "satisfied that on the balance of probabilities that Gareth was killed unlawfully". There was insufficient evidence to give a verdict of unlawful killing. The coroner concluded that another party placed the bag containing Williams into the bath, and on the balance of probabilities locked the bag. The coroner said that Williams was probably alive when he was put in the bag and that he probably died shortly afterwards from CO_{2} poisoning or from a short-acting poison. No fingerprints were found around the bath nor the bag. The coroner was critical of SIS for failing to report Williams missing for seven days, which caused extra anguish and suffering for his family, and led to the loss of forensic evidence.

The coroner rejected suicide, interest in bondage or cross-dressing, or "auto-erotic activity" being involved in Williams's death. She said his visits to bondage websites only occurred intermittently and were not of a frequency to indicate an active interest. The coroner condemned leaks about cross-dressing as a possible attempt at media manipulation.

The coroner was highly critical of the Metropolitan Police's Counter Terrorism Command (SO15), who failed to tell the senior investigating officer before the inquest began of the existence of nine memory sticks and other property in Williams's SIS office. SO15 failed to take formal statements when interviewing SIS officers. The coroner said the possible involvement of SIS staff in the death was a legitimate line of inquiry for the police.

== Metropolitan Police investigation ==
The finding by the coroner prompted a re-investigation by the Metropolitan Police lasting a further 12 months, which officers said had been allowed unprecedented access to serving MI6 staff following strong criticism at the inquest of the spying agency's actions following the death of Mr Williams.

Metropolitan Police Deputy Assistant Commissioner Martin Hewitt announced that despite a re-examination of all evidence and the investigation of new leads, no definitive answers had been obtained as to the cause of Williams's death, and the "most probable scenario" was that he had died alone in his flat in Pimlico, central London, as the result of accidentally locking himself inside the bag.

== 2015 developments ==
In September and October 2015, Boris Karpichkov, a former KGB agent who defected from Russia and who now lives in Britain, stated during interviews that "sources in Russia" had claimed that the Russian Foreign Intelligence Service, also known as the SVR, was responsible for Williams's murder. According to Karpichkov, the SVR tried and failed to blackmail Williams into becoming a double agent.

In response to the SVR's attempts, Williams claimed that he knew "the identity of a Russian spy inside the GCHQ". Karpichkov claimed that Williams's threat meant that "the SVR then had no alternative but to exterminate him to protect their agent inside GCHQ". Regarding the cause of death, Karpichkov claimed that the SVR killed Williams "by an untraceable poison introduced in his ear".

The 2015 BBC Two television series London Spy was loosely based on the Williams case. The miniseries stars Ben Whishaw as Danny, who is accused of murder after his partner, MI6 spy Alex, is found dead inside a locked trunk.

== 2024 review ==
The Metropolitan Police concluded a further evidence review in 2024, which followed on from a 2021 independent forensic report passed to the police in November 2023. There were no new findings of DNA, nor that a third party was present at the time of Williams' death.

== See also ==
- List of unsolved deaths
- List of unusual deaths in the 21st century
- Zersetzung (decomposition)
