= A4080 road =

British A road

Coordinates: 53.1624°N 4.3543°W

The A4080

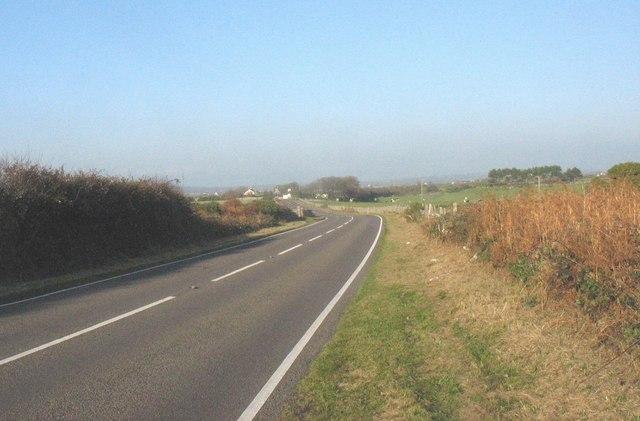
The A4080, south of Pensarn

The A4080 is a British A road which is located on the Island of Anglesey, Wales. It follows a very roundabout route from the A5 road at Llanfairpwllgwyngyll via Newborough and Rhosneigr back to the A55 and the A5 about 9 miles (14 km) south of Holyhead. In all the road is about 17 miles (27 km) long.

== The route ==
The A4080 branches off the A5 at Llanfairpwllgwyngyll, bridges the main railway line and heads south. At first it runs parallel with the Menai Strait but then moves further inland passing through the village of Brynsiencyn, where there are some sharp bends, and curving round the village of Dwyran. Another sharp bends leads to a straight section of road which passes the Anglesey Model Village. This section ends in a roundabout from which the last exit turns northwestwards and soon reaches Newborough where the B4221 branches off to the right. Passing through Newborough Forest and past Malltraeth Sands, the A4080 crosses the Afon Cefni at Malltraeth.

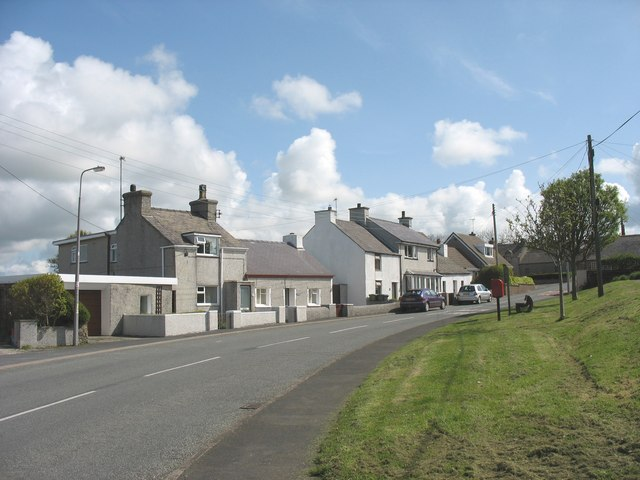
The A4080 at Hermon

A section of road follows with several sharp bends, after which it passes through the villages of Hermon and Llangadwaladr, crosses some dunes and the Afon Ffraw to enter Aberffraw. About three miles later, the sea becomes visible to the left. Leaving the coast soon afterwards, the road splits; one section goes straight ahead and under the railway, while the other loops back to the left, with a small lake on the right, and enters the seaside village of Rhosneigr. It curves round to the right, passes under the railway and rejoins the other branch at Llanfaelog, having covered a distance of 2.5 miles (4.0 km) as against the other branch's 0.5 miles (0.8 km). Now travelling northeastwards, the road continues for about 3 miles (5 km) to join the A55 at a dumbbell interchange, terminating a few hundred yards later at the A5 between Bryngwran and Gwalchmai, the road continuing northeastward as the B5112.

== Improvements ==
In 2015, Anglesey County Council obtained grants worth more than £400,000 from the Road Safety Capital grants programme and the Welsh Government's "Safe Routes in Communities" scheme to make improvements to the A4080 Engedi to Aberffraw section, the A4080 Brynsiencyn to Newborough section and the B4419 Pentre Berw to Llangaffo. Works to be done included new signage, road markings and bend improvements.
