= Tŷ Croes =

Coordinates: 53.2233°N 4.4757°W

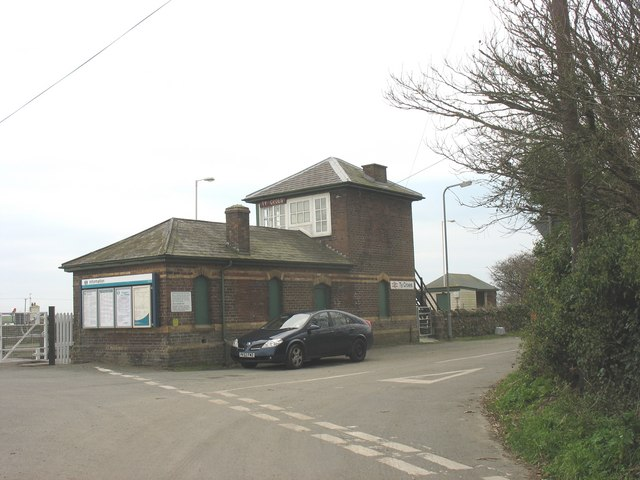
- Tŷ Croes railway station exterior

- Location within Anglesey
- OS grid reference: SH345726
- Principal area: Anglesey
- Preserved county: Gwynedd
- Country: Wales
- Sovereign state: United Kingdom
- Post town: Tŷ Croes
- Postcode district: LL63
- Dialling code: 01691
- Police: North Wales
- Fire: North Wales
- Ambulance: Welsh
- UK Parliament: Ynys Môn

Tŷ Croes (Welsh pronunciation: [tɨː ˈkroːɨ̯s]) is a small settlement two miles east of Rhosneigr, Anglesey, Wales.

It was, for a short time, the home of No. 144 Signals Unit RAF, an RAF Strike Command mobile radar reserve.

It has a railway station on the North Wales Coast Line which runs between Holyhead and Crewe.

Tŷ Croes is home to Anglesey Circuit that holds events at both club and national level. The circuit was extended in 2006 and is used by a number of groups for testing both cars and motorcycles. One advantage of the circuit is its comparative remoteness (from London) which allows testing to be done without attracting too much attention.
