= Valley, Anglesey =

Village and community in Anglesey, Wales

Coordinates: 53.28401°N 4.56203°W

Valley: Welsh: Y Fali
- Village and community
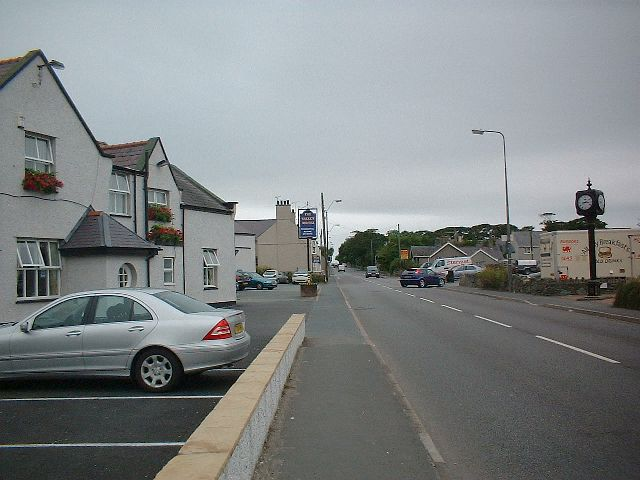
- Population: 2,361
- Principal area: Anglesey
- Country: Wales
- Sovereign state: United Kingdom
- Post town: HOLYHEAD
- Postcode district: LL65
- Dialling code: 01407
- Police: North Wales
- Fire: North Wales
- Ambulance: Welsh
- UK Parliament: Ynys Môn
- Senedd Cymru – Welsh Parliament: Bangor Conwy Môn
- List of places UK Wales Anglesey Map of the community

Valley (Welsh: Y Fali) is a village, community, and former electoral ward near Holyhead on the west coast of Anglesey, North Wales. The population during the 2001 census was 2,413, decreasing to 2,361 at the 2011 census.

== History ==
=== Etymology ===
The origin of the name has been the subject of much debate for more than a century. Thomas Morgan derived the name as a corruption of "Mael-dy" (house of trade). Morgan links the name with the writings of Tacitus, who stated that trade with Ireland was conducted from here in the time of Julius Agricola.

Gwilym T. Jones and Tomos Roberts state that early accounts name the area as Glan Môr Tŷ Coch and Glan Môr Castell Llyfaint. They offer two further possible derivations of the name Valley; firstly that the name derives from the Irish word Baile (a settlement) and secondly that it developed when the Stanley Embankment (known by locals as 'The Cob') was built in the 1820s and a depression (or valley) was dug to yield rubble for its construction. The cluster of dwellings nearby was then given the name by these labourers.

In Modern Welsh the name is usually rendered as Y Fali. However for a time until the early 2000s it was officially known as Y Dyffryn in Welsh.

=== Social history ===
A workhouse was opened in the village in 1870. The building was later converted into a hospital, which was demolished as a result of the Stanley Hospital in Holyhead beginning to serve the village.

== Political boundaries ==
Prior to the 2012 Anglesey electoral boundary changes Valley was an electoral ward to the Isle of Anglesey County Council. It is now part of the larger Llifon ward, together with Llanfaelog and Llanfair-yn-Neubwll.

The community includes the village of Llanynghenedl and part of Four Mile Bridge.

== Transport ==
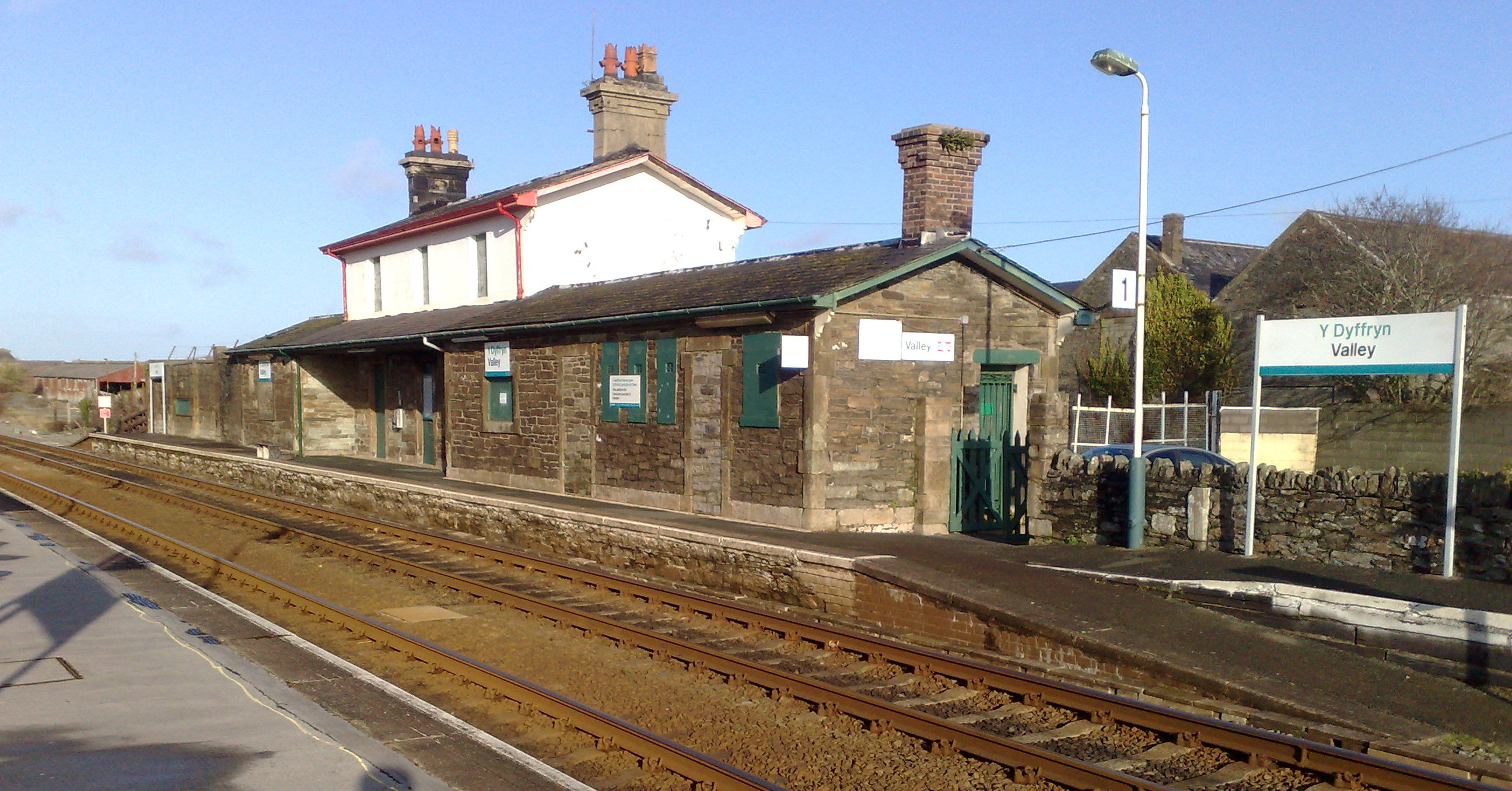
Valley Railway Station, 2009.

RAF Valley is a nearby Royal Air Force station concerned with the training of fast jet pilots. The runways are also used by Anglesey Airport who make commercial flights to Cardiff (and previously the Isle of Man). Valley railway station is on the North Wales Coast Line and its signal box is Grade II listed. Thomas Telford's A5 road bisects the village.

== Sport ==
Valley has a football club, whose senior team, CPD Y Fali, play in the North Wales Coast West Football League Division One. They play their home matches on Station Road which is situated between the North Wales Coast railway line and the A55 North Wales Expressway.

== Religious sites ==
The church of St Michael was built in the village in 1881. The church was largely paid for by William Owen Stanley, and a later extension to the church incorporated stones from a previous parish church which was demolished.

== Climate ==
Climate data for Valley (1991–2020 normals, extremes 1941-present)
Month	Jan	Feb	Mar	Apr	May	Jun	Jul	Aug	Sep	Oct	Nov	Dec	Year
Record high °C (°F)	14.8 (58.6)	18.8 (65.8)	20.6 (69.1)	23.0 (73.4)	29.2 (84.6)	33.9 (93.0)	33.6 (92.5)	33.0 (91.4)	29.4 (84.9)	25.0 (77.0)	18.8 (65.8)	15.6 (60.1)	33.9 (93.0)
Mean daily maximum °C (°F)	8.4 (47.1)	8.4 (47.1)	9.8 (49.6)	12.1 (53.8)	15.0 (59.0)	17.2 (63.0)	18.8 (65.8)	18.8 (65.8)	17.3 (63.1)	14.3 (57.7)	11.3 (52.3)	9.1 (48.4)	13.4 (56.1)
Daily mean °C (°F)	6.1 (43.0)	6.0 (42.8)	7.2 (45.0)	9.1 (48.4)	11.8 (53.2)	14.1 (57.4)	15.8 (60.4)	15.9 (60.6)	14.4 (57.9)	11.8 (53.2)	8.9 (48.0)	6.8 (44.2)	10.7 (51.3)
Mean daily minimum °C (°F)	3.8 (38.8)	3.6 (38.5)	4.5 (40.1)	6.1 (43.0)	8.6 (47.5)	11.0 (51.8)	12.9 (55.2)	13.1 (55.6)	11.6 (52.9)	9.2 (48.6)	6.6 (43.9)	4.4 (39.9)	8.0 (46.4)
Record low °C (°F)	−12.2 (10.0)	−12.2 (10.0)	−8.3 (17.1)	−2.8 (27.0)	−0.3 (31.5)	1.2 (34.2)	3.9 (39.0)	5.0 (41.0)	1.8 (35.2)	−1.7 (28.9)	−5.0 (23.0)	−9.3 (15.3)	−12.2 (10.0)
Average precipitation mm (inches)	74.6 (2.94)	62.0 (2.44)	57.0 (2.24)	54.4 (2.14)	52.4 (2.06)	57.1 (2.25)	57.4 (2.26)	69.2 (2.72)	73.9 (2.91)	101.6 (4.00)	103.3 (4.07)	93.3 (3.67)	856.3 (33.71)
Average precipitation days (≥ 1.0 mm)	14.1	11.6	11.2	10.9	9.3	9.3	10.5	10.6	11.0	13.9	16.3	15.8	144.5
Mean monthly sunshine hours	60.6	85.1	131.7	181.8	233.4	219.3	205.5	187.9	150.7	107.9	62.5	48.3	1,674.7
Source 1: Met Office
Source 2: Starlings Roost Weather

== Notable people ==
- Gareth Williams (1978–2010) was a Welsh mathematician and employee of GCHQ seconded to the Secret Intelligence Service (SIS or MI6) who was found dead in suspicious circumstances; he came from Valley and is buried in Ynys Wen Cemetery.
- George North is a professional rugby union player who plays for Ospreys in the United Rugby Championship and for the Wales national team. He attended Ysgol Gymuned Y Fali.
