= Tŷ Croes railway station =

Railway station in Anglesey, Wales

Tŷ Croes
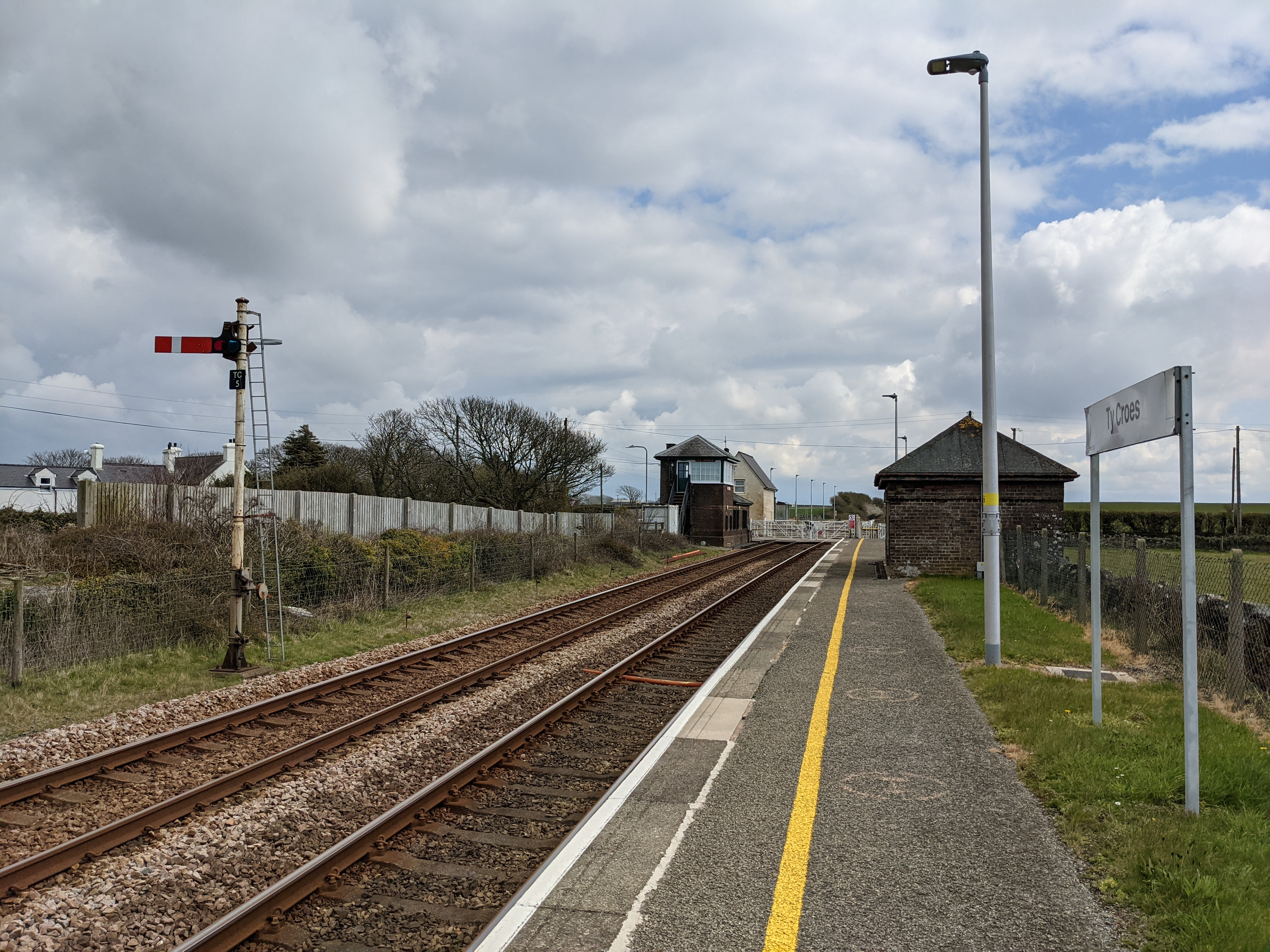

General information
- Location: Tŷ Croes, Anglesey; Wales
- Coordinates: 53.223°N 4.475°W
- Grid reference: SH348723
- Manager: Transport for Wales Rail
- Platforms: 2

Other information
- Station code: TYC
- Classification: DfT category F2

Passengers
- 2021/22: ▲3,902
- 2022/23: ▲4,882
- 2023/24: ▲7,412
- 2024/25: ▲8,244
- 2025/26: ▼7,626
Location
Notes
- Passenger statistics from the Office of Rail and Road≥

Tŷ Croes railway station serves Tŷ Croes on the isle of Anglesey, Wales which is served by Transport for Wales Rail and is a request stop.

== History ==
The station, originally to be named Llanfaelog, was opened in November 1848 with a signal box being added in 1872. The box is located next to a level crossing which separates the two staggered platforms. There was a warehouse and a crane nearby and a small goods yard which closed in 1964. The crossing gates are still hand worked by the crossing keeper – the Grade II listed box was formerly a block post, but no longer works as such (the block section now runs from Gaerwen to Valley).

== Facilities ==
The station is unstaffed and has no ticketing provision – all tickets must be bought in advance or on the train. The station buildings still stand and are now used as a private residence; basic waiting shelters are provided for passenger use on each side. Digital display screens, timetable posters and a telephone provide train running information. Step-free access is available to both platforms via ramps from the road that crosses the line here, though the gradient on both makes the station unsuitable for wheelchair users.

== Services ==
There is a two-hourly weekday service in each direction from the station. Most eastbound trains run to Wrexham General, Shrewsbury and Birmingham International, although a small number run to either Crewe or Cardiff instead.

The Sunday service is irregular (six westbound, seven eastbound) and runs mainly to/from Crewe with one service to Wrexham and Cardiff.

Preceding station	National Rail	Following station
Bodorgan	Transport for Wales Rail North Wales Coast Line	Rhosneigr
