= Valley Station signal box, Anglesey =

Listed signal box in Wales

Valley Station signal box
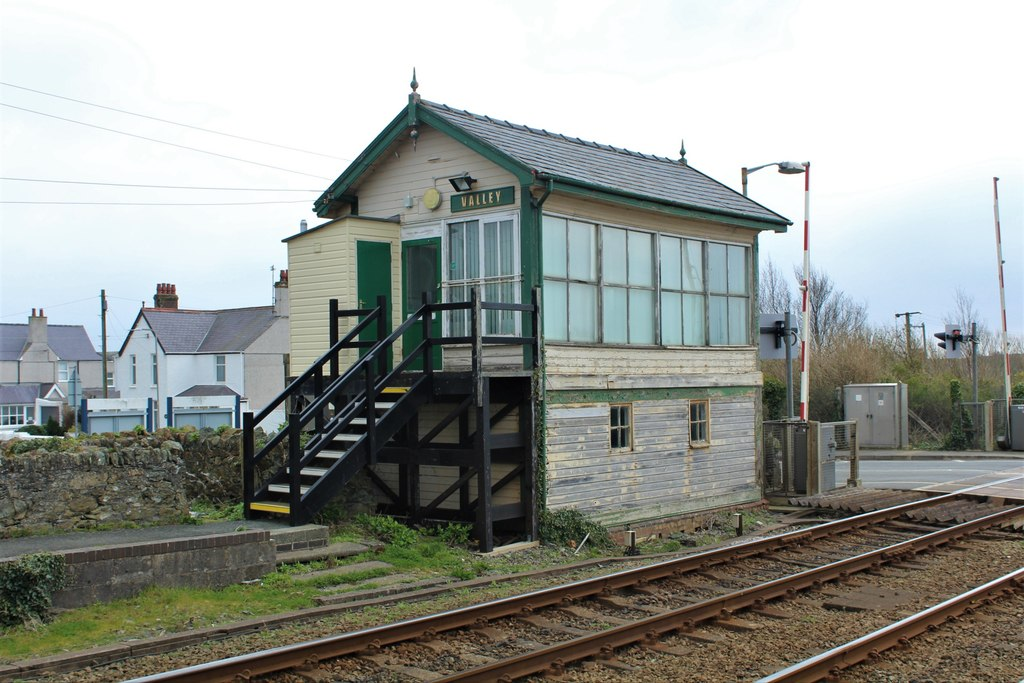
- Valley Station signal box in March 2019

General information
- Location: Valley railway station, Anglesey, North Wales
- Coordinates: 53.281369°N 4.563075°W
- Year built: Mid-19th century

Technical details
- Material: Timber
- Floor count: 2

Design and construction
- Designations

Listed Building – Grade II
- Official name: Valley Station Signal Box
- Designated: 19 January 1998
- Reference no.: 19233

Valley Station signal box is a Grade II listed, 2-storey, timber built signal box located near the railway station in Valley, Anglesey, North Wales.

Located directly north-west of the level crossing on the B4545 road, the signal box is thought to have been built in the middle of the 19th century as one of 15 new huts built along the Chester and Holyhead Railway.

It is clad with horizontal tongue and groove paneling, with large sash windows and a slate roof. The interior of the signal box remains unchanged and still features the original lever frames.

The signal box was designated a Grade II listed building on 19 January 1998.

In 2021 the signal box underwent restoration works following the discovery of wet rot within the building.
