= Engedi, Anglesey =

Hamlet in Anglesey, Wales

Coordinates: 53°15′28″N 4°27′24″W

Engedi
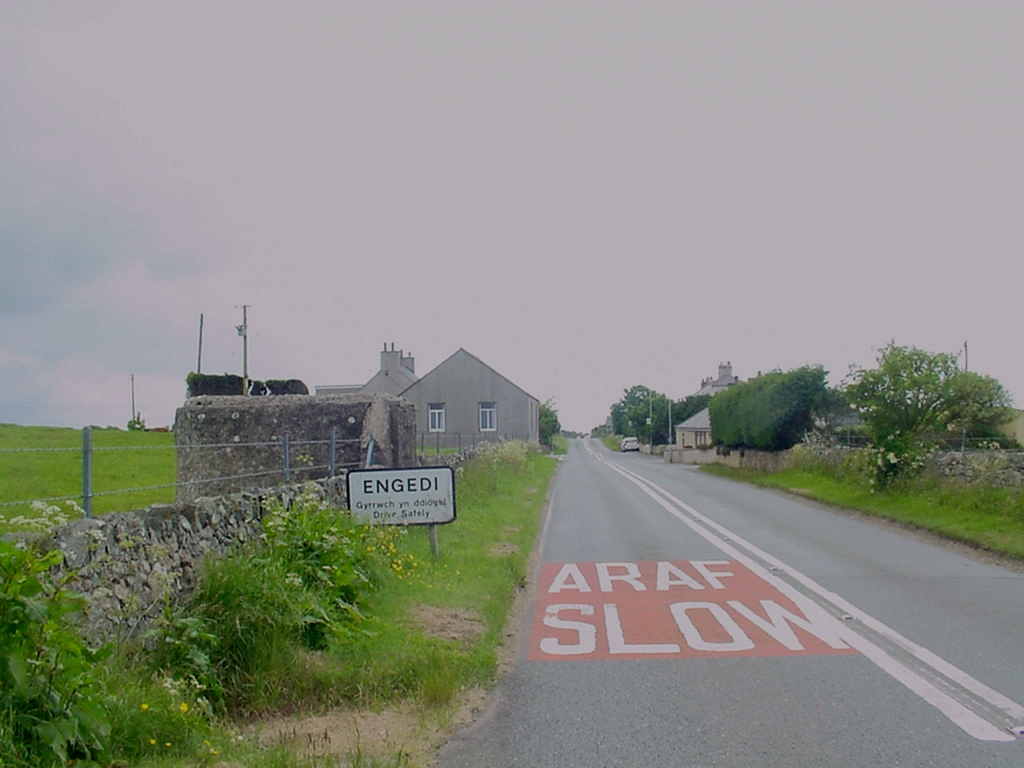
- The hamlet of Engedi.

- Location within Anglesey
- OS grid reference: SH 3622 7624
  - Cardiff: 134 mi (216 km)
  - London: 219 mi (352 km)
- Community: Bryngwran
- Principal area: Anglesey
- Country: Wales
- Sovereign state: United Kingdom
- Post town: Holyhead
- Police: North Wales
- Fire: North Wales
- Ambulance: Welsh
- UK Parliament: Ynys Môn
- Senedd Cymru – Welsh Parliament: Ynys Môn

Engedi is a hamlet in the community of Bryngwran, Anglesey, Wales. Engedi is about 9 miles (14 km) southeast of Holyhead and 15 miles (24 km) southeast of Bryngwran along the A4080 road, off the North Wales Expressway.

== Landmarks ==
The hamlet contains the Engedi Welsh Calvinistic Methodist Chapel, for which the hamlet is named. It was built in 1888 in the later Vernacular style. The chapel belongs to the pastorate of Reverend Gerallt Lloyd Evans.

== See also ==
- List of localities in Wales by population
