= Aberffraw =

Village and community in Anglesey, Wales

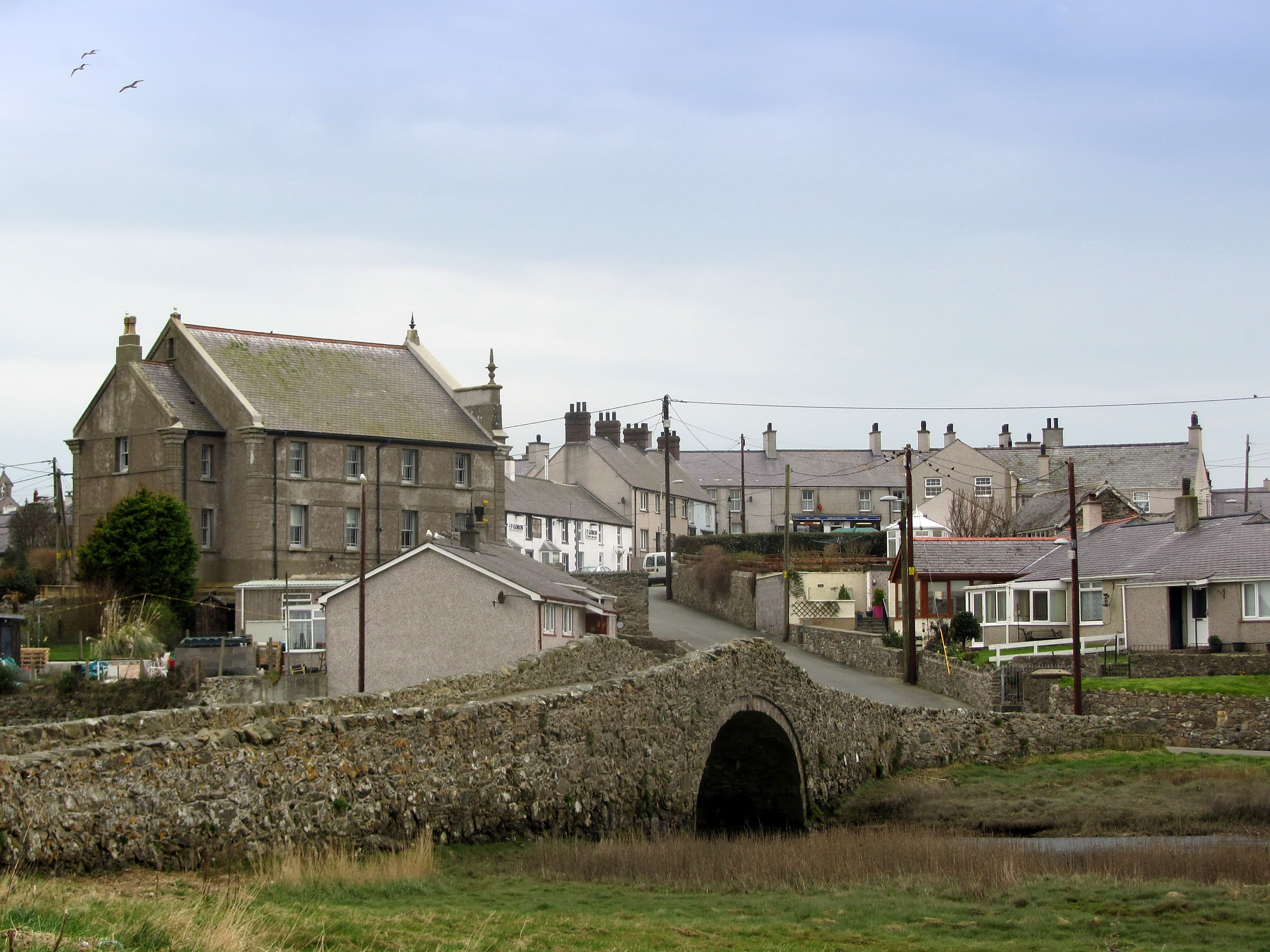
- The village from the east

- Location within Anglesey
- Population: 597 (2021)
- OS grid reference: SH3568
- Community: Aberffraw
- Principal area: Anglesey
- Preserved county: Gwynedd
- Country: Wales
- Sovereign state: United Kingdom
- Post town: TŶ CROES
- Postcode district: LL63
- Dialling code: 01407
- Police: North Wales
- Fire: North Wales
- Ambulance: Welsh
- UK Parliament: Ynys Môn
- Senedd Cymru – Welsh Parliament: Bangor Conwy Môn
- List of places UK Wales Anglesey 53.188°N 4.463°W Map of the community

Aberffraw (Note: Pronounced as Aberffro. Spelled variously in period sources, including Aberfrau.) is a village and community on the south west coast of the Isle of Anglesey in Wales. The village is 9 miles from the island's county town, Llangefni, and is on the west bank of the Afon Ffraw (Ffraw River). The community includes Soar and Dothan. It is on the A4080 and the nearest rail station is Bodorgan.

The village has a long history as a settlement from the Mesolithic Age. More recently, in medieval times, the site became the capital of the Kingdom of Gwynedd and a royal residence for the family of the House of Aberffraw.

The name of the village is often truncated to "Berffro" in the local dialect of Welsh. Local attractions include a part of the Anglesey Coastal Path, the beach and dunes at Aberffraw bay, a lake for recreational fishing, historic churches and prehistoric burial chambers.

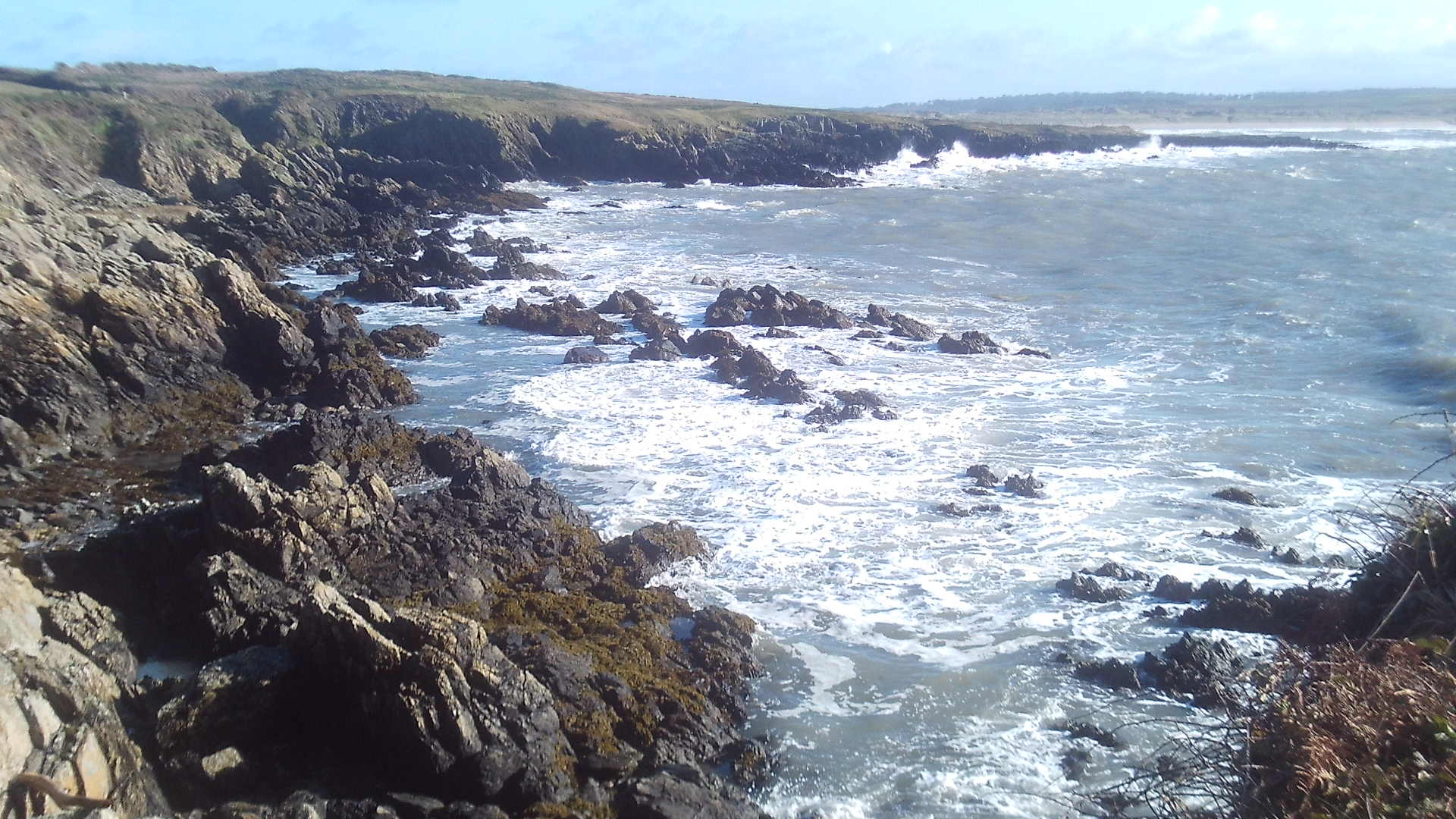
Coast near Aberffraw

== History ==
Aberffraw is one of the oldest Mesolithic sites from prehistoric Wales, dating to c. 9,000 years ago. At Aberffraw Bay is the Trwyn Du (Welsh: Black nose) site. The burial was discovered whilst excavating a Bronze Age kerb cairn (bowl barrow) from 2000 BC, which was excavated because of the threat of coastal erosion. The 1977 dig revealed that the cairn was built on top of a deposit of 7,000 flint tools and two axes from 7000 BC, a few millennia after the last Ice Age.

An intact monument near Aberffraw is Din Dryfol, a Neolithic chambered tomb from 3000 BC, and around the banks of the nearby River Gwna are the remains of a stone hut circle and roundhouses, which were lived in during the Welsh Iron Age, c. 500 BC, until the British Roman period, before the 4th century.

In Welsh mythology Aberffraw features as the site of Branwen and Matholwch's wedding festival, where Efnysien maimed Matholwch's horses.

=== Aberffraw Royal court ===
Aberffraw is situated on Anglesey (Ynys Môn) at the mouth of the River Ffraw. The location was once a royal court where the early Kings of Gwynedd established their principal (chief) family seat. The site was a preshistoric settlement later occupied during the Roman period (c. 0- 400 AD). The town became a Welsh Princely court (Welsh: Llys) and location of a royal palace as part of the administrative centre and one of the three county divisions (hundred, Welsh: cantref) of Anglesey. (Note: The palace (or llys) at Aberffraw was originally thought to have been located to the west of the village but recent research suggests it was likely located within the boundaries of the village itself.)

==== Medieval Royal House of Aberffraw ====
In the early Middle Ages Aberffraw was settled by Cadwallon Lawhir ap Einion who built a palace in the 5th century. Rhodri the Great, the King of Gwynedd rebuilt the residence in the year 873 and had returned the capital of the Kingdom of Gwynedd to the Aberffraw cantref after Cadwallon ap Cadfan (c. 620) moved the royal court to Caernarfon in mainland Wales in the 7th century. Rhodri's palace (Welsh: Llys) became a royal court and his son Anarawd ap Rhodri started a cadet branch named the Royal House of Aberffraw. Anarawd's descendants settled the area for centuries as Kings of Gwynedd and were eventually titled the Prince of Wales. Llywelyn ab Iorwerth in 1201 re-established the palace as a residence and installed personnel to work similarly to the original set up of the king's royal suite based on the rules from their creation in 914.

During the Viking Age (850s – 1100s), Wales was subjected to Viking raids all throughout the country between 852 and 919 (the Jómsvíkinga saga refers to that period). An example of this pattern was with the Viking leader Ingimund who was expelled from Dublin and tried unsuccessfully to establish a base on Anglesey (c. 902), but instead left for Chester. Then, between the years 950–998 the second phase of Viking raids in Wales saw raids, attacks, and slave raids with a Viking raid at Aberffraw in 968. King Maredudd ab Owain paid the demanded ransom for the safe return of the Welsh who were enslaved by the Vikings.

The court was then eventually dismantled in 1317 to provide building materials for Caernarfon Castle across the Menai Strait. The royal court was destroyed on Saint Nicholas Day, 6 December 1331, when a sandstorm buried 186 acres from Aberffraw north to Rhosneigr on the west of Anglesey in the Aberffraw cantref. This disaster drove families living in this area from their homes, and they migrated south to the villages of Llanddwyn and Newborough.

=== Aberffraw cantref (hundred) ===
The Meyrick (Welsh: Meurig) family of Bodorgan, Anglesey, were given the Crown lease for the manor lands of the Aberffraw cantref during the Tudor period (c. 1500). Llewelyn ap Heilyn fought at the Battle of Bosworth alongside Henry VII of England. Afterward, Llewelyn's son Meurig became captain of the bodyguard to Henry VIII and was rewarded with the lease. Today, the same family at Bodorgan Hall (near Aberffraw) is represented by the Tapps-Gervis-Meyrick baronets. After the Meyrick family ownership, it was the Owen family of Penrhos locally on Anglesey who owned the lands of Aberffraw until 1808. Subsequently, the Hughes family of Baron Dinorben, the Williams and Wynn families of Baron Newborough, then the Marquess of Anglesey Paget family, and finally Lord Bulkeley (Viscount) all briefly owned the lands surrounding Aberffraw. Today, the current town was developed in the mid to late 20th century. In 1949, the village was called the poorest in Anglesey by Illustrated magazine.

== Aberffraw village ==
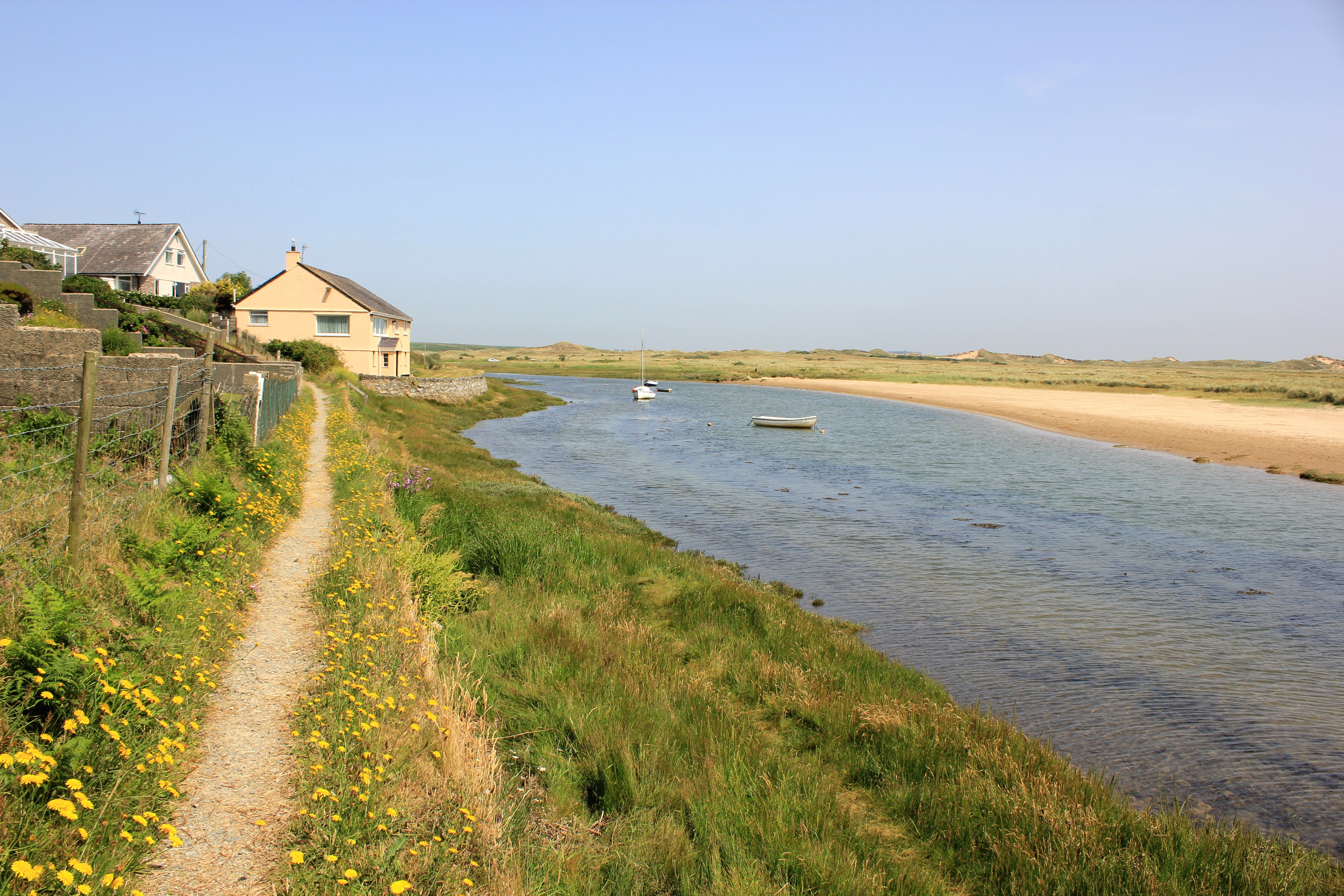
Wales costal path, Aberffraw on the river Ffraw.

=== Attractions ===
Attractions near Aberffraw village include Barclodiad y Gawres, a neolithic burial chamber, and Llyn Coron, which is used for fly fishing. The village has a sandy beach, which was awarded the Blue flag rural beach award in 2005. Aberffraw bay is a part of the Anglesey Coastal Path.

=== Churches ===
Near the village, on the tidal island of Cribinau, is St Cwyfan's Church. Perched on top of a rock, this "church in the sea" was constructed in the 12th century and renovated in 1893–94. The church still holds services in the summer and is sometimes used for weddings.

St Beuno's Church, Aberffraw is a double-naved church of the later medieval style. The building dates from the 12th century and is a Grade II* listed building. Additions to the church were made in the 14th and 16th centuries, and a repair that involved reroofing the building took place in about 1840. There were further extensive alterations made in 1868.

=== Llys Llywelyn ===
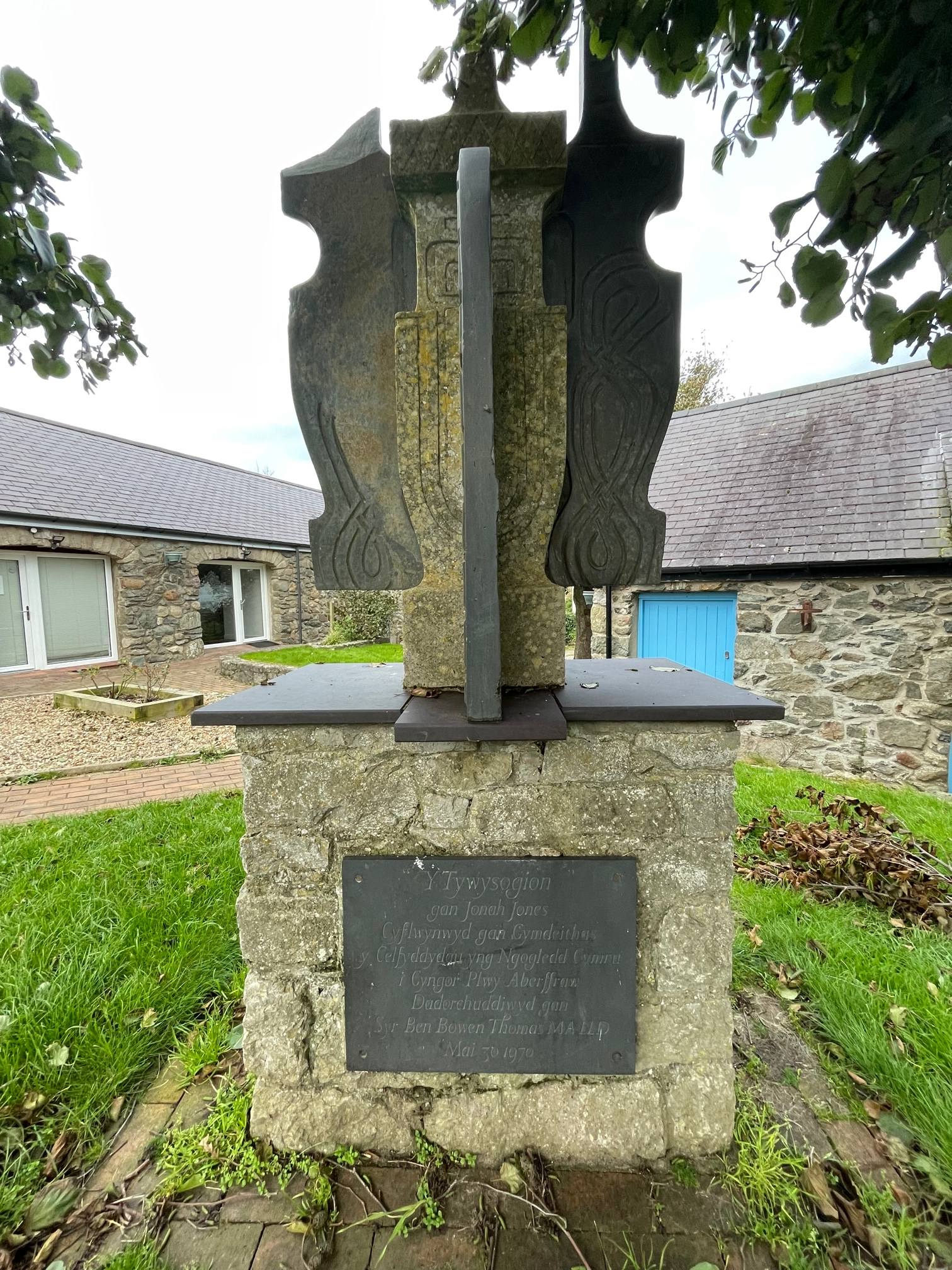
Llys Llywelyn sculpture by Jonah Jones

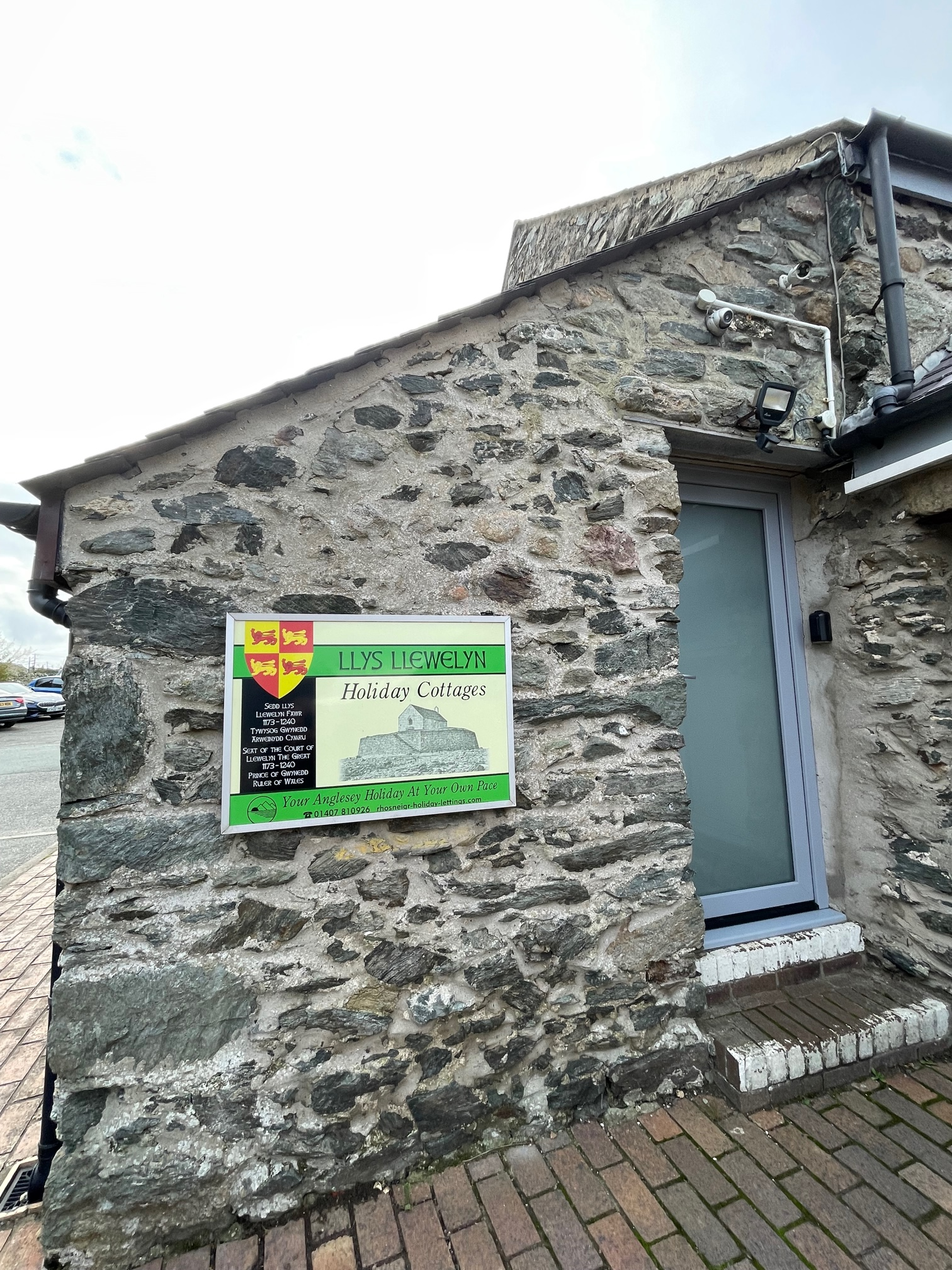
The former heritage centre entrance and information board

There is a holiday home accommodation in the village named Llys Llywelyn, it was once a heritage centre dedicated to the history of the medieval Kingdom of Gwynedd and its royal court (llys) at Aberffraw. There is a sculpted piece of artwork by Jonah Jones dedicated to the Princes of Gwynedd. After more than a decade of negotiations, the heritage centre was moved to Llangefni and the centre was turned into holiday cottages in 2020. There is a cafe on site for visitors.

=== Recreation and education ===
The village has a Welsh football league system team named C.P.D. Aberffraw (Aberffraw FC in English); they play in the village of Bryn Du. There was a village school at Aberffraw since before 1860, but it closed in 2011.

== Governance ==
There was a change in the Anglesey UK electoral wards in 2013, reducing the number of councilors from 40 to 33. Aberffraw remained in the Bro Aberffraw area with 2 council members representing the Isle of Anglesey. As of the 2022 election, the ward is represented by Plaid Cymru councillors Arfon Wyn and John Ifan Jones.

=== Demographics ===
A historical census showed that the population in Aberffraw (Aberffro) grew from 936 in 1801 to 1,042 in 1971. In 1831, there was a total of 332 males in the village, and of those that were over the age of 20, 106 were farmworkers.

For the 2011 census, Aberffraw had a population of 620, with 334 fully fluent Welsh-speaking individuals, 146 who could not speak the Welsh language at all, and the rest of the population as partially fluent. The findings also showed 67.5% of the population could speak the Welsh language, a fall from 80.8% in 2001.

The 2021 census shows Aberffraw to have 597 residents, in an area of 29.55 km^{2}; this is a reduction in population of 0.38% since the previous census from 2011.

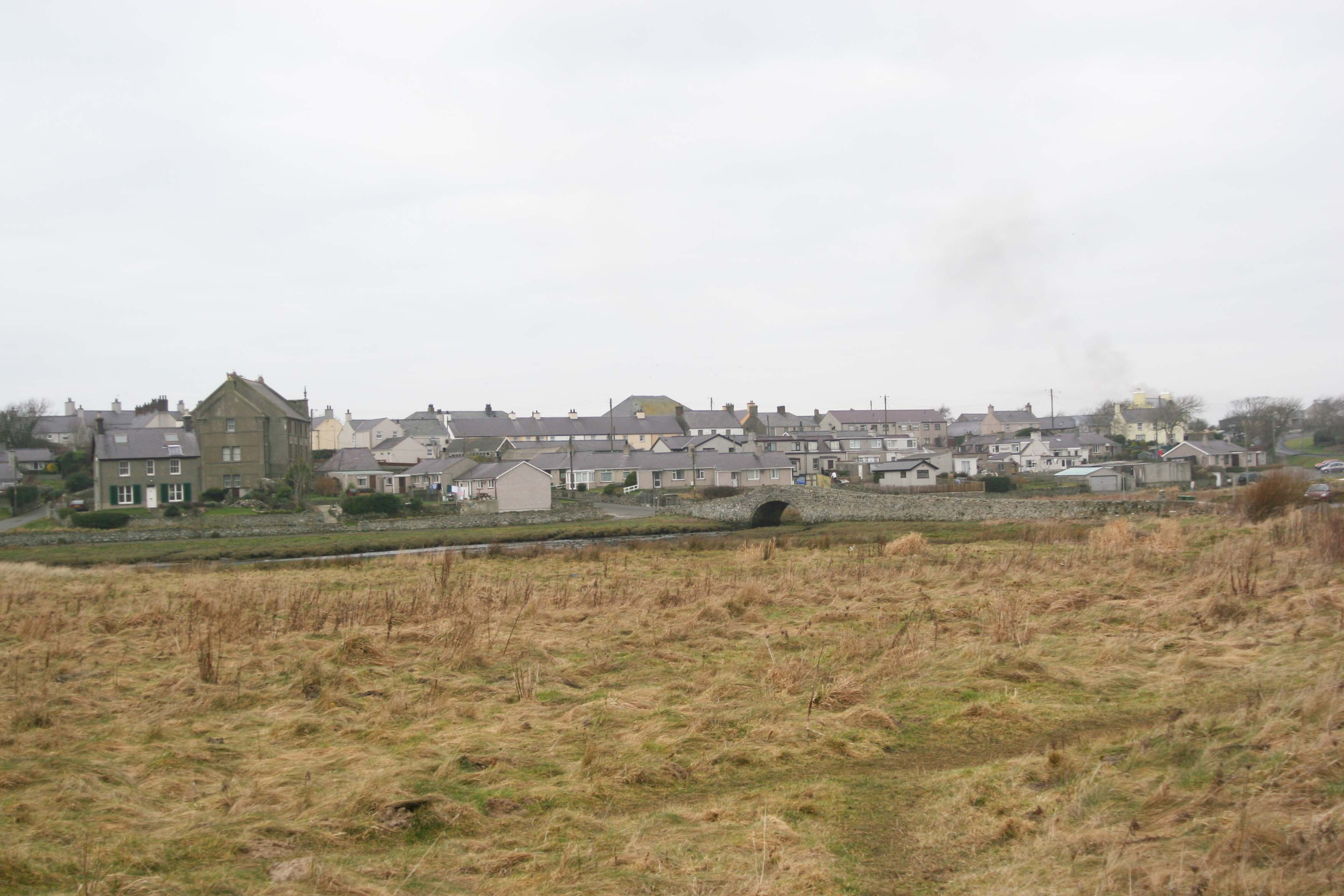
Aberffraw village and surrounding grasslands

== Former airfield ==
RAF Bodorgan near the village was once known as RAF Aberffraw (Royal Air Force). Constructed in September 1940, the airfield was used in World War 2 as a testing site for military aircraft, Queen Bee, a pilotless airplane. In 1941, the airfield changed its name to Bodorgan, and by 1944 it was only used as a storage airfield. The grass runway airfield was closed in 1945. After the opening of the airfield in Aberffraw, another was opened during the same period; this airfield is based at Rhosneigr, Anglesey. RAF Valley is still in use today.

== Aberffraw dune system ==
The Aberffraw dunes cover an area of 883 acres (357 ha) in West Anglesey and are one of the biggest dune habitats in the UK. The dunes are preserved as a site of special scientific interest (SSSI) and are part of a Special Area of Conservation which spans from Abermenai Point in the southeast of Anglesey, then across the island westward, and they are 5 km north-west of Newborough Warren. The most common species of plants are marram grass, which supports the sand and creates dunes, as well as early sand-grass, red fescue, and lady's bedstraw. The dunes' variety of natural flora and fauna such as waterwort and weeds are supported by the local lake, Coron, as well as the river Ffraw. The area is a popular walking destination.
