= Valley railway station =

Railway station in Anglesey, Wales

Valley Welsh: Y Fali
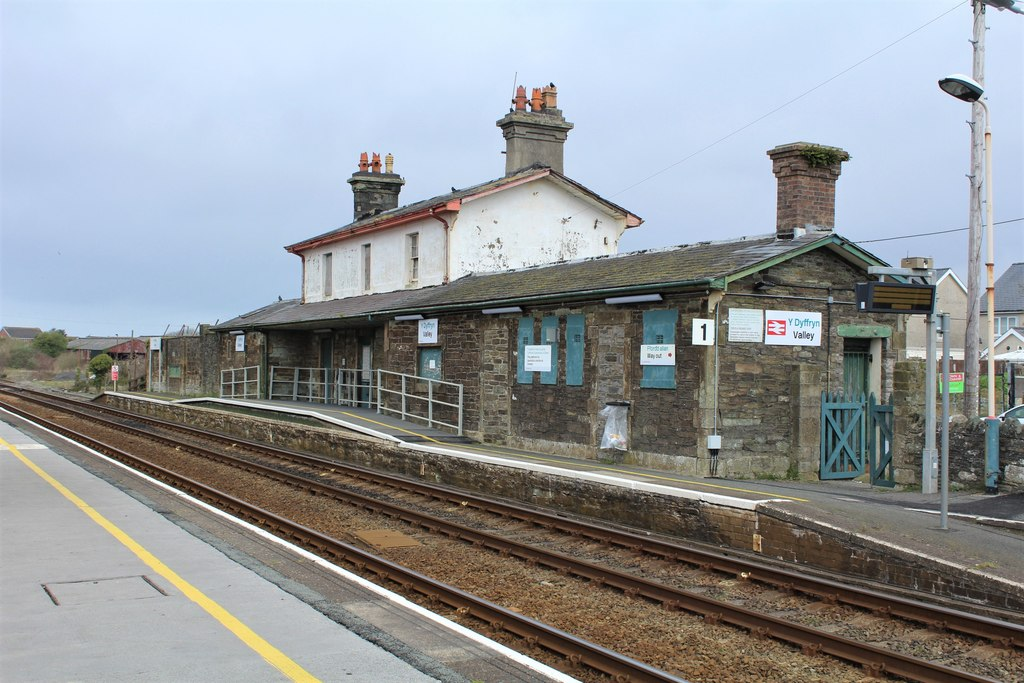

General information
- Location: Valley, Anglesey; Wales
- Coordinates: 53.281°N 4.563°W
- Grid reference: SH291791
- Manager: Transport for Wales Rail
- Platforms: 2

Other information
- Station code: VAL
- Classification: DfT category F2

Key dates
- October 1849: Opened
- 14 February 1966: Closed
- 15 March 1982: Reopened
- 6 July 2020: Temporarily closed
- 21 August 2021: Reopened

Passengers
- 2021/22: ▲5,254
- 2022/23: ▲12,436
- 2023/24: ▲17,558
- 2024/25: ▲21,588
- 2025/26: ▲22,444

Listed Building – Grade II
- Feature: Valley Railway Station Main Building
- Designated: 30 July 1991
- Reference no.: 5759
Location
Notes
- Passenger statistics from the Office of Rail and Road

Valley railway station (Welsh: Gorsaf reilffordd y Fali) is a railway station that serves the village of Valley in Anglesey, Wales. It is the last station before the western terminus of the North Wales Coast Line at Holyhead, and is sited 260 miles 9 chains (418.6 km) from London Euston, measured via Crewe. It also serves the nearby RAF base of the same name, although the next stop, Rhosneigr, is actually closer to the base.

== History ==
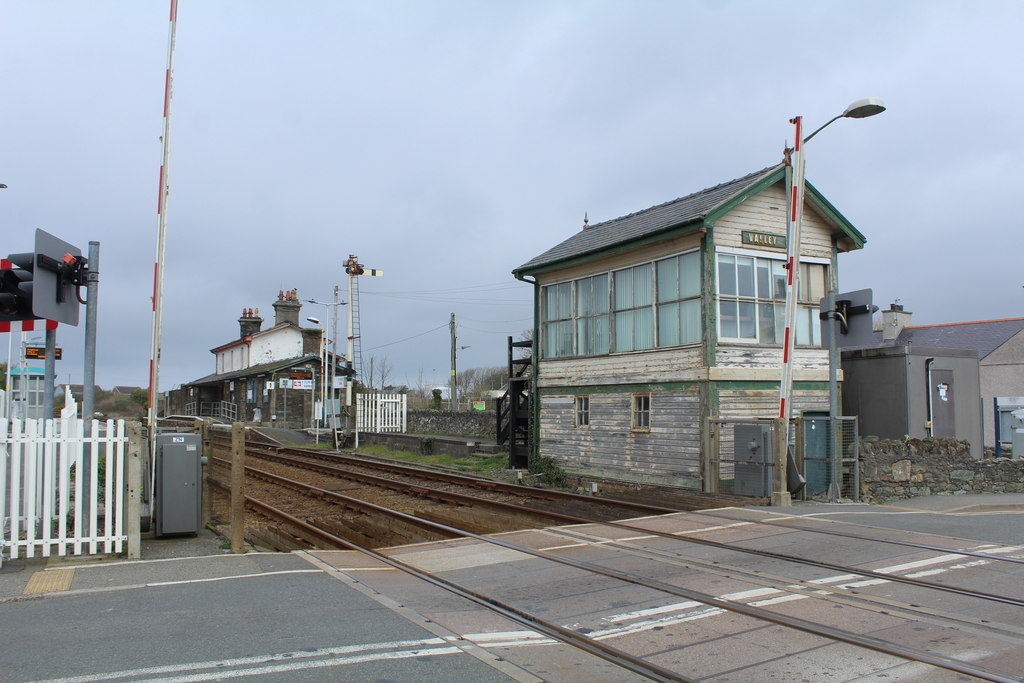
The station, signal, signal box and level crossing at Valley (March 2019)

Opened in May or June 1849, there was a small goods yard for livestock and a siding for a nearby corn mill. Improvements during the 19th century included refurbishing the station buildings in 1870 and lengthening of the platforms in 1889. In 1962 transfer sidings were put in place near the station used for the dispatch by rail of spent fuel from the Wylfa nuclear power station and in 1989 sidings for turning steam locomotives were put in place.

The station was one of many small ones on the line closed on 14 February 1966 as a result of the Beeching Axe, but it reopened to passenger trains in March 1982 after a sustained lobbying campaign by local residents. The westbound platform and waiting room were both demolished after the initial closure, but replacements were constructed prior to reopening; the main buildings on the eastbound side survived during the closure period (along with the platform they stood on) and remain intact to this day. The Grade II listed station signal box remains in use to supervise the B4545 level crossing here in addition to the aforementioned sidings. It was renovated in 2021, after the discovery of extensive rotting of the wood.

On 6 July 2020 trains stopped calling at the station because of the short platform and the inability to maintain social distancing between passengers and the guard when opening the train door during the COVID-19 pandemic. On 11 August 2021 it was announced that the station would re-open. Local member of the Senedd Rhun ap Iorwerth criticised the length of the closure stating, "I still can't understand why there couldn't have been a way to open it safely before now, and I've made my frustration clear, but better late than never."

== Facilities ==
The station is unstaffed (like all those between Bangor and Holyhead) and has no ticket machine, so all tickets have to be purchased prior to travel or on the train. Train running information is offered via a telephone, digital CIS displays and timetable posters. Step-free access is provided to both sides via the level crossing, although access for wheelchairs and mobility scooters is not easy from the down platform (2) due to the unpaved path.

== Passenger volume ==
Passenger volume at Valley
	2004–05	2005–06	2006–07	2007–08	2008–09	2009–10	2010–11	2011–12	2012–13	2013–14	2014–15	2015–16	2016–17	2017–18	2018–19	2019–20	2020–21	2021–22	2022–23	2023–24	2024–25
Entries and exits	16,899	16,326	17,624	18,703	13,982	15,156	16,768	17,676	17,968	18,236	16,660	16,006	15,062	14,742	14,512	13,458	142	5,254	12,436	17,558	21,588

The statistics cover twelve month periods that start in April.

== Services ==
There is a basic two-hourly weekday service in each direction from the station in the May 2026 timetable, with several additional morning and evening departures. Most eastbound trains run to Wrexham General, Shrewsbury and Cardiff Central, although some run to Manchester Airport. The Sunday service is irregular but serves a variety of eastbound destinations, including Crewe, Cardiff, Manchester Airport and Birmingham International.

Preceding station	National Rail	Following station
Rhosneigr	Transport for Wales North Wales Coast Line	Holyhead
