= Val Broeksmit =

Whistleblower and FBI informant

Valentin "Val" Broeksmit
- Born: Valentin Broeksmit; January 14, 1976; Ukraine
- Died: April 25, 2022 (aged 46); Wilson High School, El Sereno, Los Angeles, California, U.S.
- Occupations: Whistleblower; FBI informant
- Known for: Whistleblowing on Deutsche Bank

Valentin "Val" Broeksmit (January 14, 1976 – April 25, 2022) was a whistleblower and FBI informant who exposed financial irregularities at Deutsche Bank. After his adoptive father, a senior Deutsche Bank executive, died by suicide in 2014, Broeksmit discovered thousands of confidential bank documents in his father's email account. He subsequently shared these records with journalists and federal investigators, contributing to coverage of the bank's involvement in money laundering and its financial relationships with Donald Trump.

== Early life ==
Broeksmit was born in Ukraine in 1976 and emigrated to Chicago in 1979 with his parents, Alla and Alexander. After his parents divorced, he spent time in a foster home in Cook County. When he was nine, his life changed significantly when Alla met and married William S. Broeksmit, a risk specialist who would go on to become a senior executive at Deutsche Bank. The family relocated to New Jersey, where Val grew up with access to his stepfather's world of high finance.

== Discovery of the Deutsche Bank documents ==
=== William S Broeksmit ===
In January 2014, William S. Broeksmit committed suicide. He had been hired by Edson Mitchell in the 1990s to spearhead Deutsche Bank's expansion into international investments and money management, and had grown very close to bank co-CEO Anshu Jain.

While going through his late father's email account, Val Broeksmit discovered a vast archive of internal bank records, including minutes of board meetings, spreadsheets, and financial plans from the New York branch of Deutsche Bank Trust Company Americas (DBTCA). He began sharing these documents with journalists at Welt am Sonntag and ZDF, whose reporting revealed numerous irregularities. These included a $10 billion money laundering scheme run through Deutsche Bank's Moscow branch—for which the New York State Department of Financial Services later fined the bank $425 million—as well as derivatives improprieties.

== Cooperation with investigators ==
In January 2017, Glenn R. Simpson of Fusion GPS paid Broeksmit for copies of his documents. Two years later, musician Moby introduced Broeksmit to Adam Schiff, chairman of the House Intelligence Committee, which was investigating Donald Trump's ties to Deutsche Bank. Broeksmit reportedly asked for payment for the documents and was refused, after which he was subpoenaed. He subsequently became a cooperating witness and shared his files with the FBI. In exchange, the bureau gave Broeksmit a "special advisory title" and assisted his French girlfriend in obtaining a US visa.

Broeksmit's relationship with federal investigators was complicated. In a 2020 meeting with the Federal Bureau of Investigation, agents asked him about Barrett Brown, a journalist and activist. Broeksmit believed the agents wanted his help setting Brown up and nearly agreed before changing his mind, telling them, "I'm not going to give you Barrett Brown right now." He later posted a recording of the meeting online.

== Criminal history ==
Broeksmit had a troubled history that complicated his credibility as a source. In 2014, the same year he discovered his father's documents, he downloaded files from the 2014 Sony Pictures hack and distributed them online, suggesting the hackers target Deutsche Bank next. He also made fraudulent purchases using his mother's stolen American Express information.

== Disappearance and death ==
In April 2021, Broeksmit went missing, though his Twitter account remained active. The Los Angeles Police Department reported he was last seen on April 6, 2021.

By early 2022, Broeksmit had resurfaced but faced new legal troubles. He was arrested for carrying a privately made firearm, and in April 2022, employees of The Brewery Art Colony filed for a restraining order against him, alleging he had threatened them with a homemade firearm as part of "a continuing pattern of unlawful and harassing conduct occurring over a significant period".

Later that month, Broeksmit was found dead on the campus of Wilson High School in El Sereno. The coroner stated the cause of death as accidental, resulting from blunt force trauma to his torso, having fallen from a tree.
