= Din Dryfol =

Neolithic burial chamber on Anglesey

Coordinates: 53°13′30″N 4°24′17″W

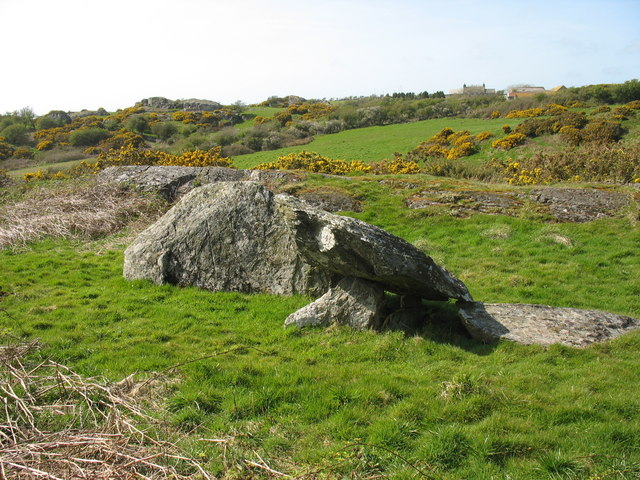
Din Dryfol Neolithic Burial Chamber

The site of Din Dryfol in the south-west corner of Anglesey, Wales.

Din Dryfol is a Neolithic burial chamber on Anglesey, in Wales. It is a scheduled monument and is maintained by Cadw. The monument is near Bethel. Three phases of use have been identified, all dating from the Neolithic period.

== Burial chamber ==
Din Dryfol is the remains of a burial chamber, part of a passage grave, a neolithic structure erected in several stages, and a type of burial structure more frequently found in Ireland than in Wales. The first part may have been constructed about 5,000 years ago.

The dolmen is located on a level platform on the flank of a small hill and is oriented northeast to southwest. Excavations in the 1960s and 1970s have identified the different phases of the development. The first chamber was constructed with side slabs and a capstone, making a rectangular box some 3 by 1 m (10 by 3 ft) and about 2 m (7 ft) tall. This is the main structure that can be seen today, the capstone having slipped to one side to rest upon the ground. The second chamber was constructed to the northeast of this, and nothing remains of it now. However two post holes show where a wooden portal or some other structure stood. The third chamber was built to the northeast of the second one. It was about 5 m (16 ft) long and parts are still visible in the form of a small upright, a large portal stone standing 3 m (10 ft) high and some way away from the other stones, and a stone stump, perhaps the remains of another portal. The whole structure would have been covered with a mound of earth or rubble, probably small and circular over the original chamber, but much longer and rather wider when all three chambers had been constructed. Although this mound has disappeared, excavations suggest that it stretched for about 65 m (210 ft) and was about 15 m (50 ft) wide. Excavations have revealed pieces of pottery and cremation sites.

== Disturbance and excavation ==
The site showed evidence of disturbance during the Roman period, with Romano-British pottery unearthed during the 1970s excavations. It was also affected by road-building in the 18th and 19th century, when here was quarrying in the area. There is now no sign of a cairn or mound. The monument was recorded in 1871 by H Pritchard, and excavated by F Lynch, firstly in 1969 to 1970 and again in 1980, which identified the phases of construction. Wooden entrance posts to the second of three chambers, to the east of the earlier structure, were also identified.
