= Aberffraw (cantref) =

Welsh medieval cantref

Coordinates: 53°11′30.74″N 4°27′49.28″W

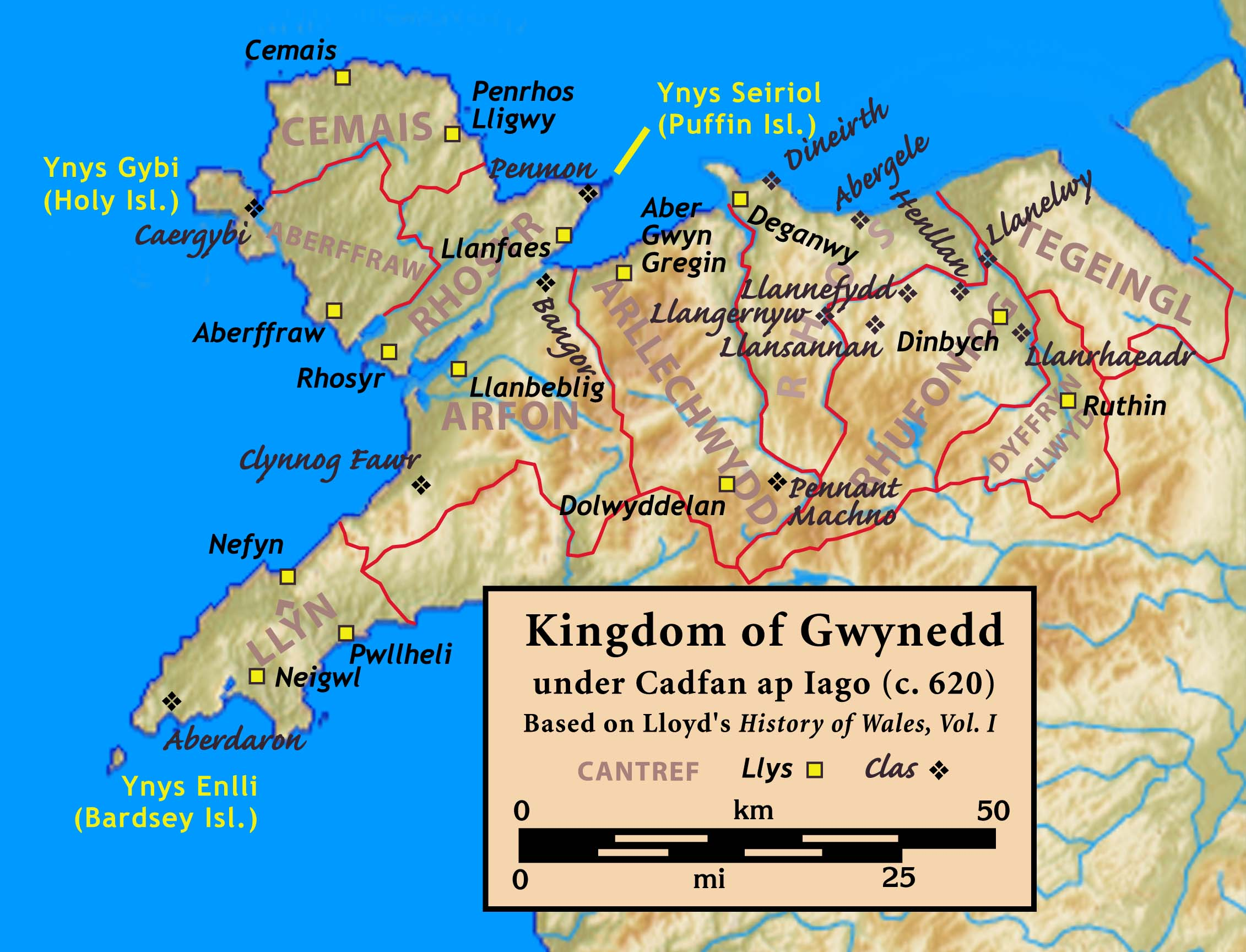
Kingdom of Gwynedd c.620, showing Anglesey cantrefi top left

Aberffraw was one of the three medieval cantrefs on the island of Anglesey, north Wales, in the Kingdom of Gwynedd as a cadet branch, named the House of Aberffraw. It lay on the western side of the island on Caernarfon Bay. Its administrative centre was Aberffraw, the ancient seat of the Princes of Gwynedd. In the 1300s, it was ruled by viceroys (Welsh: rhaglaw) from the lineage of Hwfa ap Cynnddelw who represented Anglesey in the parliament of 1327 regarding the deposition of Edward II of England.

The cantref consisted of the two cwmwds of Llifon and Malltraeth.

== See also ==
- Cemais (Anglesey cantref)
- Rhosyr (cantref)
