= Afon Ffraw =

River in the Isle of Anglesey, Wales

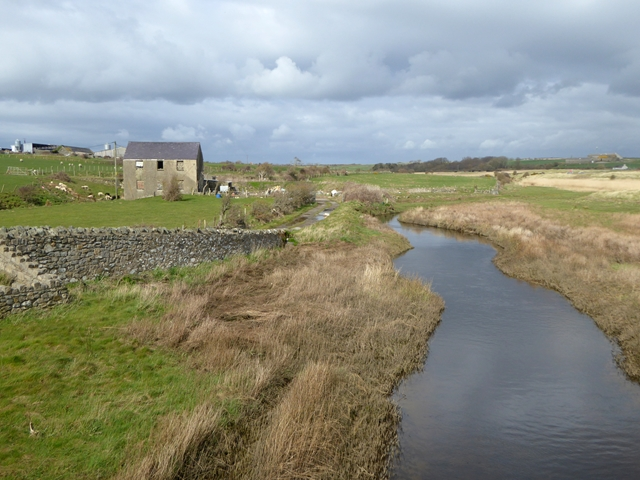
- Afon Ffraw running near Aberffraw

- Location within Wales

Location
- Country: Wales
- County: Isle of Anglesey

Physical characteristics
- Source: Llyn Coron
  - location: Near Llangadwaladr
  - coordinates: 53°12′15.07″N 4°25′57.74″W
- Mouth: Aberffraw Bay
  - location: Near Traeth Mawr
  - coordinates: 53°10′56″N 4°28′00″W

Basin features
- Tributaries
  - left: Afon Frechwen
- Bridges: Pont Aberffraw

The Afon Ffraw is a short river on the Isle of Anglesey, Wales. It arises at Llyn Coron and flows southwest for two miles along the northwestern margin of Twyn Aberffraw ('Aberffraw dunes') via the village of Aberffraw to Aberffraw Bay on the island's west coast. The river is tidal to a point just northeast of Aberffraw and is accompanied by the Wales Coast Path and Isle of Anglesey Coastal Path. Llyn Coron is fed by the Afon Gwna which rises near to Llangefni in the centre of Anglesey. The flow of the Ffraw is bolstered by the left-bank tributary, the Afon Frechwen and a larger, though unnamed right-bank tributary which rises near Gwalchmai. Pont Aberffraw is a bridge spanning the river constructed as a single stone arch in 1731. When the A4080 main coastal road was diverted onto a new line, the old bridge closed to traffic.
