= Rhosneigr railway station =

Railway station in Anglesey, Wales

Rhosneigr
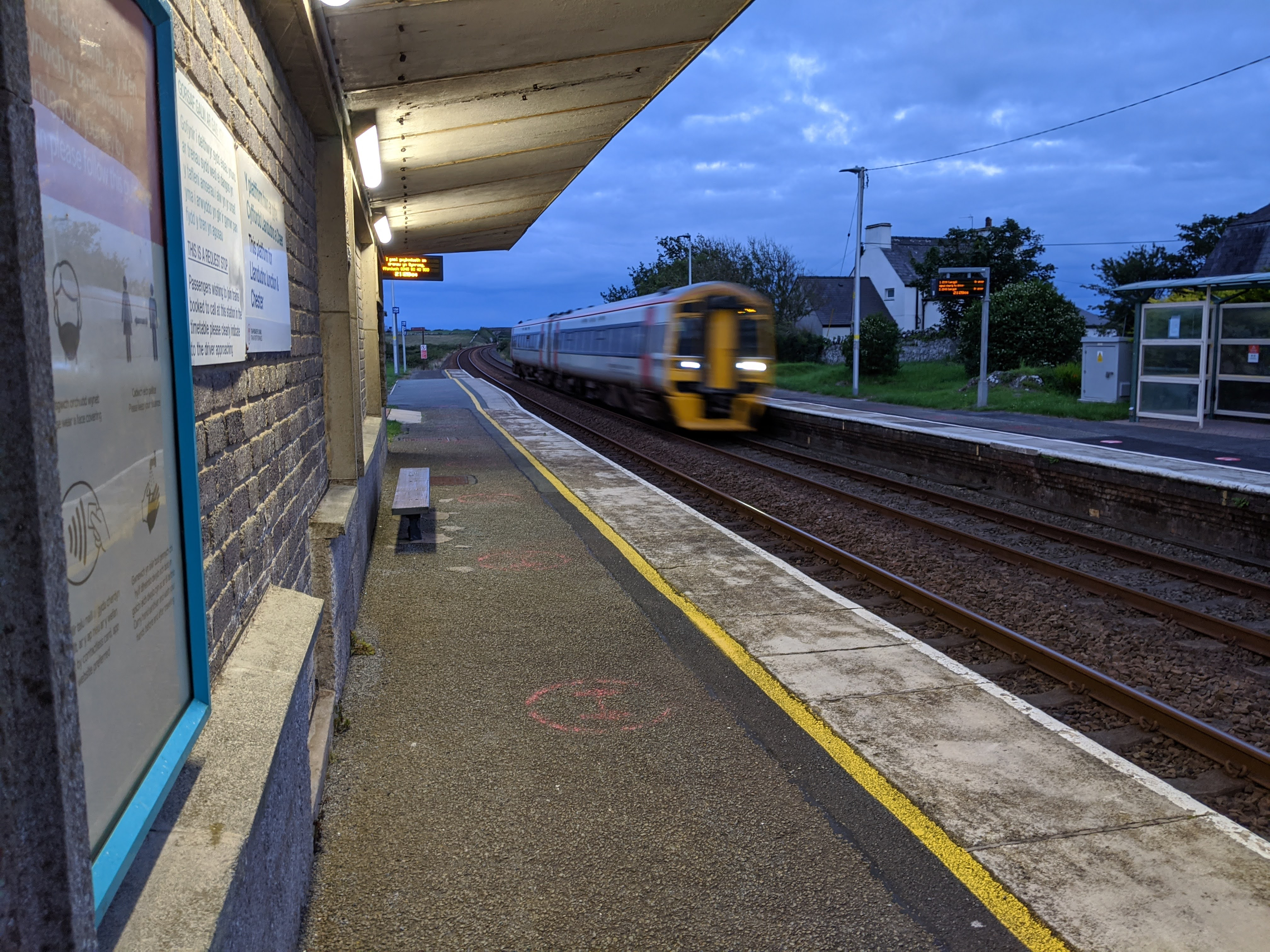

General information
- Location: Rhosneigr, Anglesey; Wales
- Coordinates: 53.235°N 4.507°W
- Grid reference: SH328737
- Manager: Transport for Wales Rail
- Platforms: 2

Other information
- Station code: RHO
- Classification: DfT category F2

Passengers
- 2021/22: ▲9,592
- 2022/23: ▲10,450
- 2023/24: ▲13,242
- 2024/25: ▲14,042
- 2025/26: ▲16,564
Location
Notes
- Passenger statistics from the Office of Rail and Road

Rhosneigr railway station serves the village of Rhosneigr on the Isle of Anglesey, off the coast of north Wales. The unstaffed station is managed by Transport for Wales Rail, who also operate all trains that serve it.

== History ==
The station was opened in May 1907, much later than the other Anglesey stations on the North Wales Coast Line. It was closed between 1 January 1917 and 1 February 1919 as an economy measure during World War I. Unlike the other stations it has neither sidings or a goods yard. The station buildings were originally made of wood but in the early 1950s they were replaced by stone structures. Of these, the structure on platform one remains whilst the one on platform two has been replaced by a metal and plastic bus stop-style shelter. The station master's house still stands but is a private dwelling.

== Facilities ==
There are no ticketing facilities of any kind here, so tickets must be bought prior to travel or on the train. The station does though have digital CIS displays to provide train running information, along with a pay phone and timetable poster boards. Although there is step-free access to each side, the paths to each platform are steep and not made up, so are unsuitable for wheelchair users.

== Services ==
There is a roughly two-hourly weekday service in each direction from the station (with some extra morning and evening trains), plus a limited Sunday service (six to Holyhead, seven toward Chester). Most eastbound trains run to Wrexham General, Shrewsbury and Birmingham International, although a few services run to either Crewe or Cardiff. Trains stop on request.

Preceding station	National Rail	Following station
Tŷ Croes	Transport for Wales Rail North Wales Coast Line	Valley
