= Rhosneigr =

Village in Anglesey, Wales

Coordinates: 53.229154°N 4.520006°W

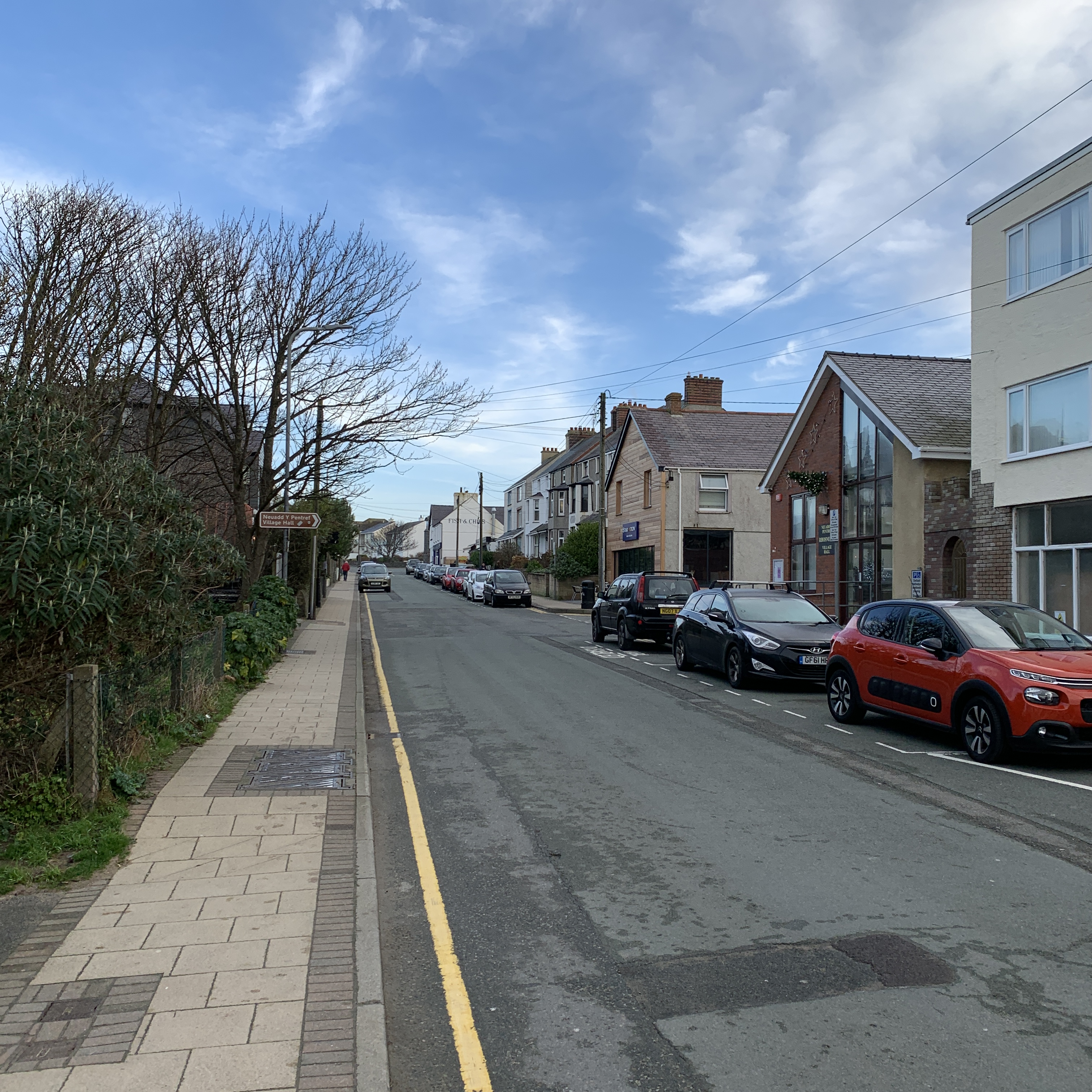
- Rhosneigr High Street, December 2019

- Location within Anglesey
- Population: 1,008
- Community: Llanfaelog
- Principal area: Anglesey
- Preserved county: Gwynedd
- Country: Wales
- Sovereign state: United Kingdom
- Post town: RHOSNEIGR
- Postcode district: LL64
- Dialling code: 01407
- Police: North Wales
- Fire: North Wales
- Ambulance: Welsh
- UK Parliament: Ynys Môn
- Senedd Cymru – Welsh Parliament: Bangor Conwy Môn

Rhosneigr (Welsh: [r̥oːsˈnɛiɡr]) is a village in the south-west of Anglesey, north Wales. It is situated on the A4080 road. It is south-east of Holyhead, and is on the Anglesey Coastal Path. From the clock tower in the village centre, RAF Valley and Holyhead Mountain (Mynydd Twr) can be seen. The towns of Holyhead and Llangefni and the city of Bangor are all within easy travelling distance.

The village contains four caravan sites, three campsites, holiday homes and bungalows, pubs, hotels, cafes, a village hall, a chapel, residential homes, a school, a fire station, a convenience store and post office, a pharmacy and a fish and chip shop. It is served by Rhosneigr railway station.

== Etymology ==
The name Rhosneigr is Welsh. Rhos is a common prefix in Welsh place names, meaning 'moor' or 'moorland'. The second part of the name neigr, is less clear, but it is likely to derive from the personal name 'Yneigr'. Yneigr was the grandson of Cunedda Wledig, an important leader in the area in the fifth century. Little is known about Yneigr, or how the village came to be named in his honour.

== Governance ==
Prior to the 2012 Anglesey electoral boundary changes an electoral ward in the same name existed, electing a county councillor to the Isle of Anglesey County Council. This ward had a population taken at the 2011 census of 1,008. A by-election took place in November 2010 following the resignation of Independent councillor (and former council leader) Phil Fowlie. The election was won by another Independent, Richard Dew. From the 1995 elections the ward had been represented by Independent councillors representing the Llifon ward. Richard Dew (Ind.) and Gwilym O. Jones (Ind.) were elected. The next by-election took place on May 5th 2022 for the revised ward of Crigyll at which 2 councillors were elected: Douglas Massie Fowlie, independent and Neville Evans, Plaid Cymru.

Rhosneigr is in the community of Llanfaelog, which elects a community council.

== Leisure ==
Recreational activities include: swimming, surfing, wind surfing, kite surfing, wakeboarding, shore and boat fishing, water skiing, golf, tennis and underwater diving.

Rhosneigr is home to Anglesey Golf Club. Maelog Lake Golf Club (now defunct) appeared prior to the First World War. The club and course disappeared at the onset of the Second World War.

It has a number of beaches including:

- 'Traeth Crigyll' that stretches from Pwll Cwch to Ynys Wellt (leading then to Traeth Cymyran), sandy beaches interspersed by rocks and views of Snowdonia. It is popular with watersports enthusiasts, notably windsurfers and sailors.
- 'Pwll Cwch' – a small, rocky beach where boats and yachts stay overnight.
- 'Traeth Llydan' which runs from the Porth y Tywod to the south Rhosneigr, ranging from pebble shores to pristine sandy shores. It is perfect for canoeing, walking and surfing. Traeth Llydan is a regular Green Coast Award Winner and is backed by sand dunes.

Llyn Maelog is around 65 acres in total with varying depth up to seven feet. It is a designated Site of Special Scientific Interest. There is a good stock of fish in the lake including perch, bream, roach and pike. A large variety of birdlife inhabits the reedbeds. Grey heron, snipe, reed warblers, coots, mallard, shelducks etc. Black-headed gulls nest on the small island. The lake is circled by public footpath and is popular with walkers. In 2011 it became the first lake in Wales to be classified as a village green.

== Education ==
Ysgol Gynradd Rhosneigr provides Welsh-medium primary education to the village and the surrounding area. As of 2024, there were 85 pupils enrolled at the school. As of 2024, 31 per cent of pupils come from Welsh-speaking homes.

In terms of secondary education, the village is in the catchment area of Ysgol Uwchradd Caergybi.

== Gallery ==
Rhosneigr
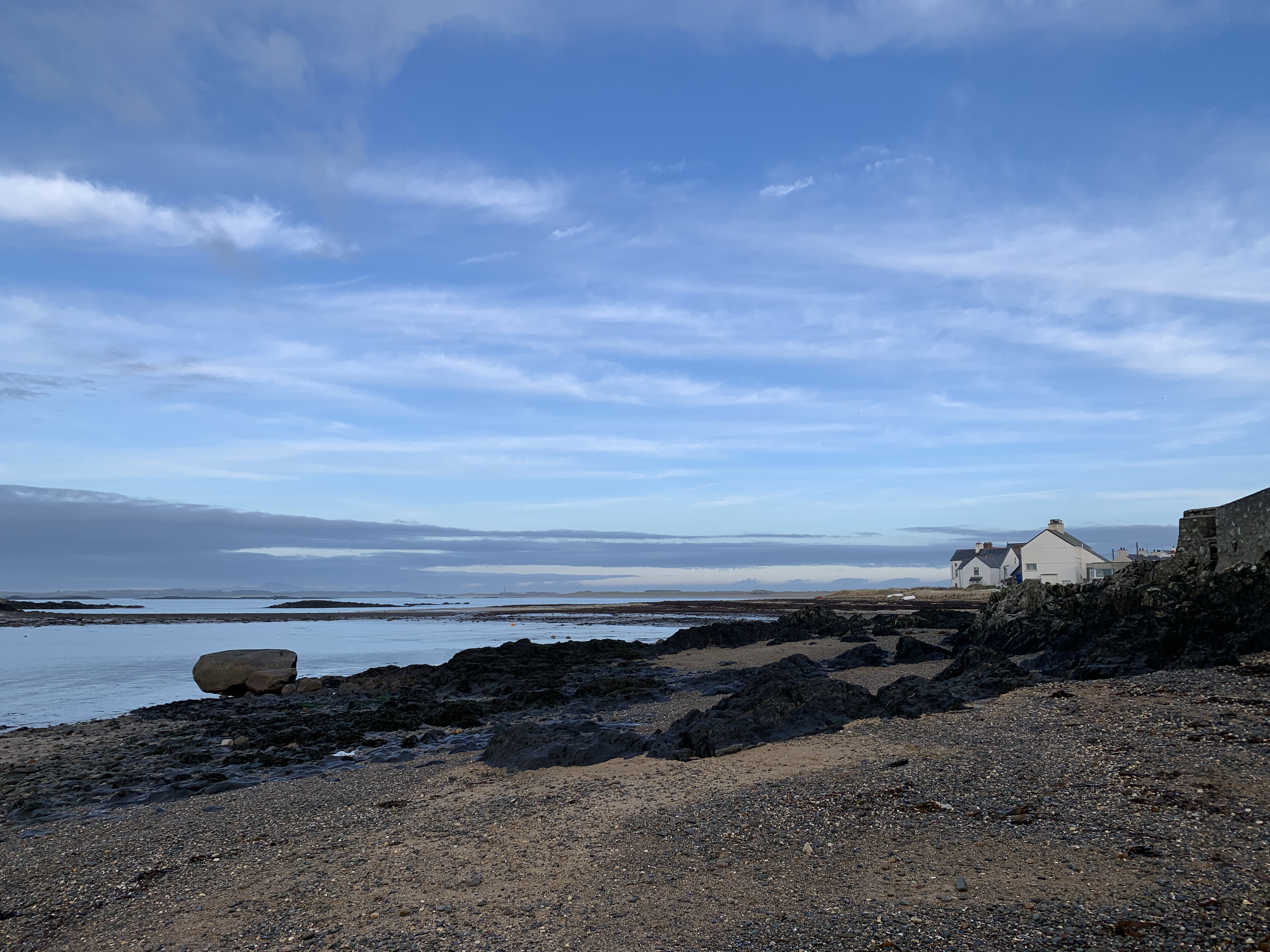
'Diving Rock', on the left of the image, often used to jump into the sea at high tide

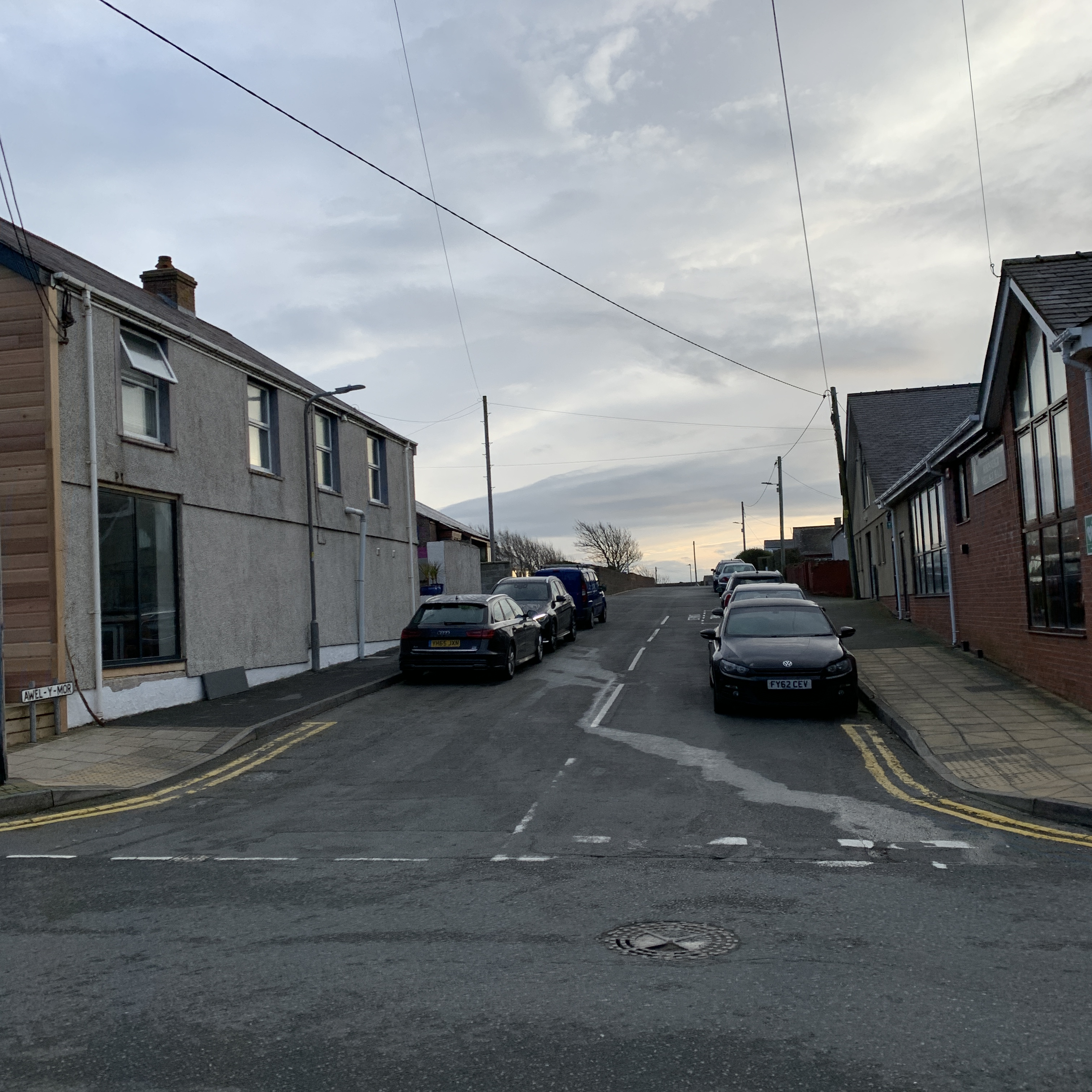
Awel-Y-Môr Road

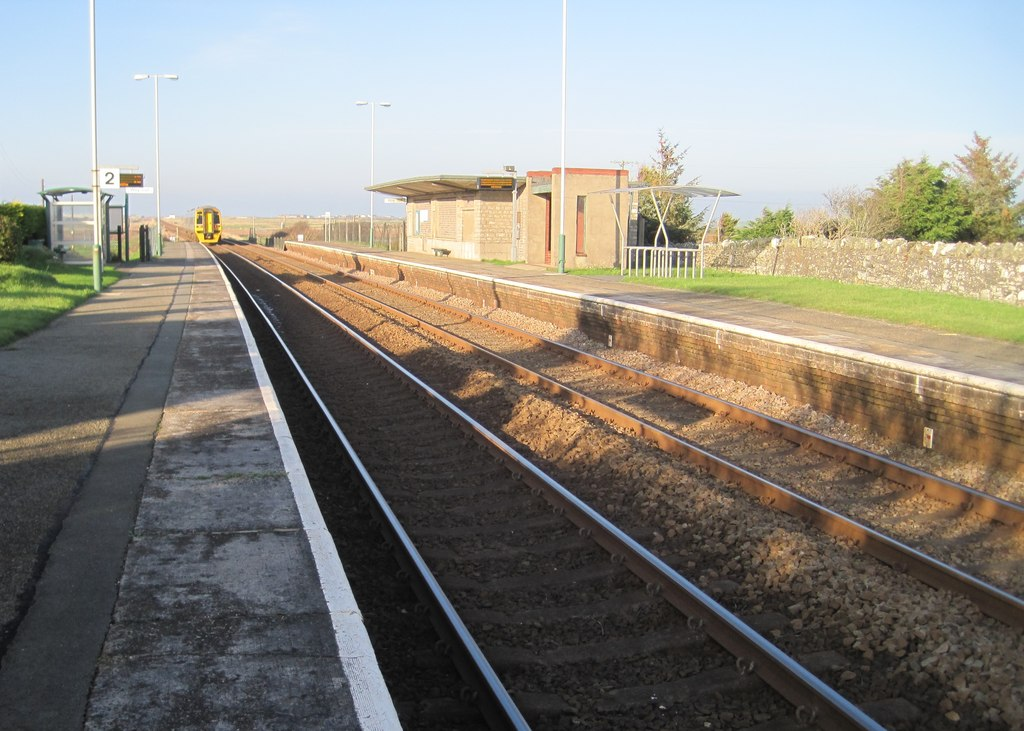
Rhosneigr railway station

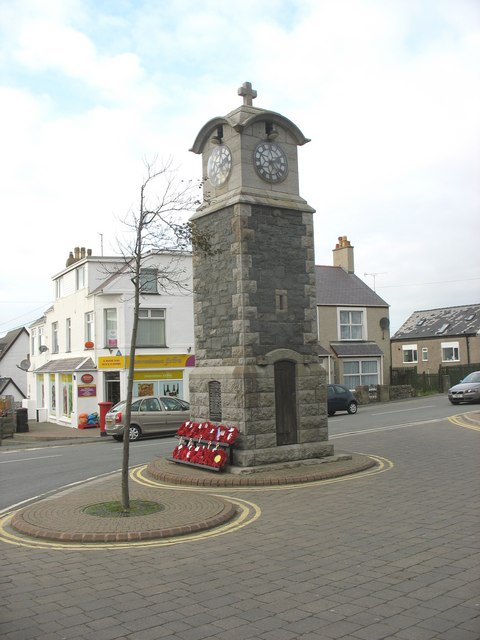
Rhosneigr War Memorial

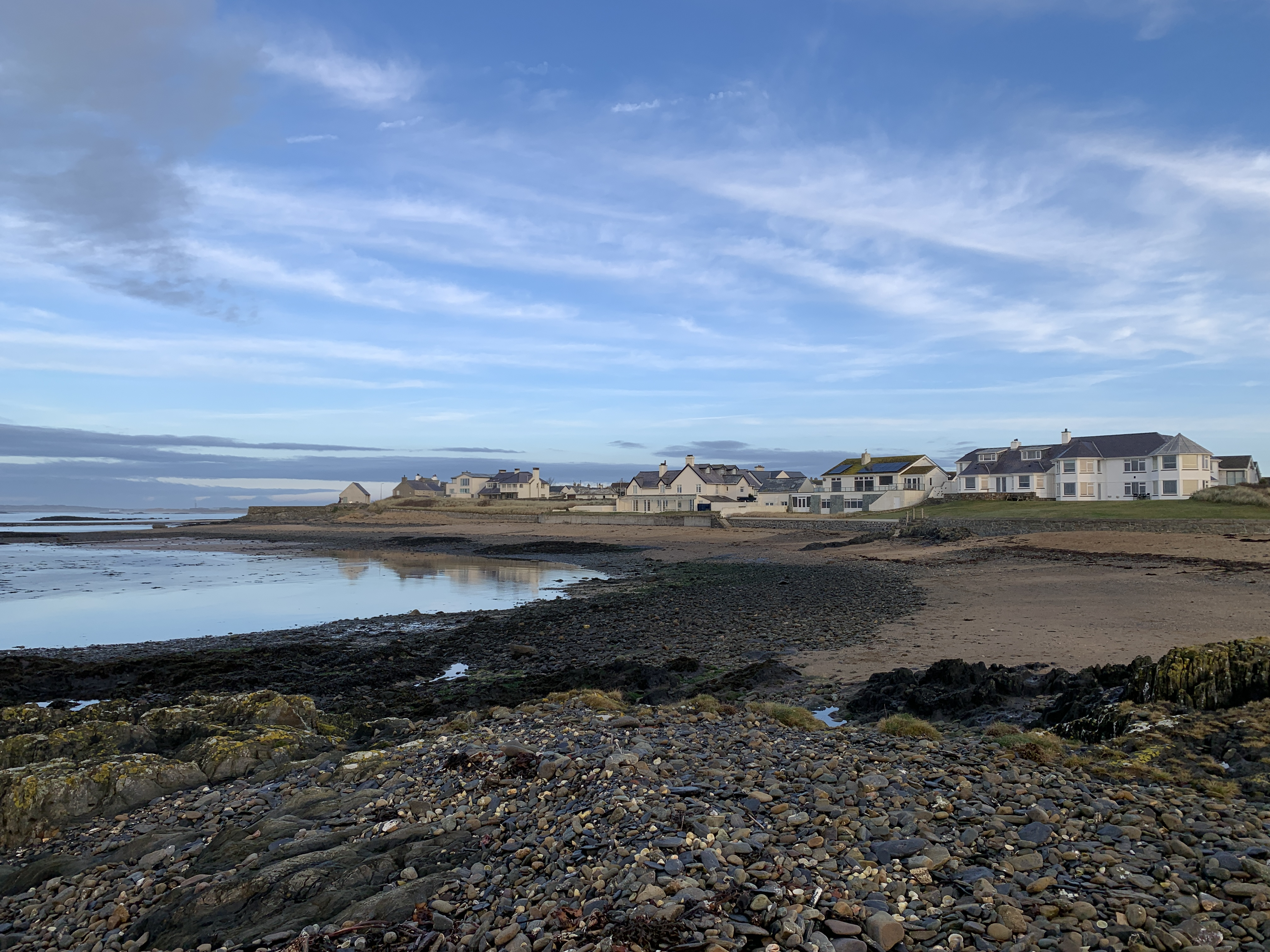
Rhosneigr, taken from Braich Parlwr

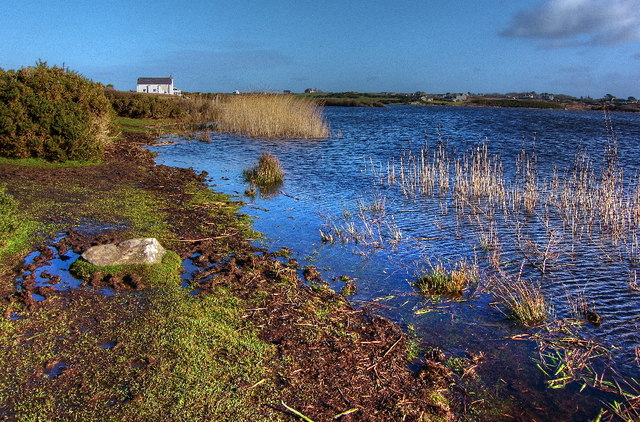
Llyn Maelog

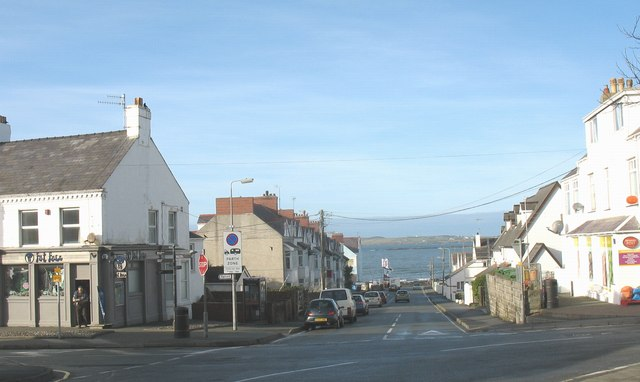
Beach Road, leading onto the beach

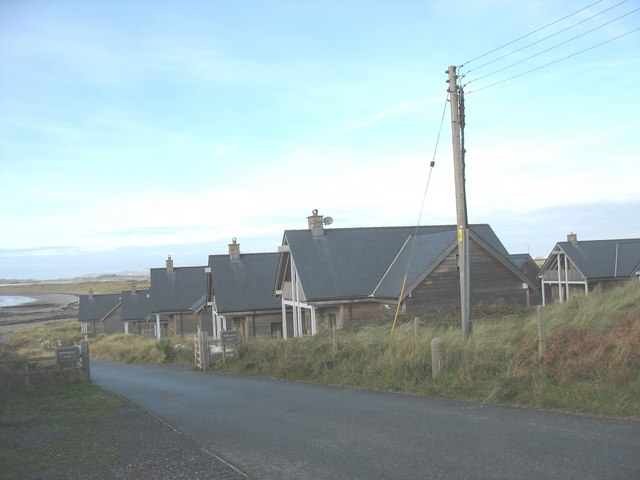
Porth Crigyll Estate – mainly holiday homes – built upon the old site of the Bay Hotel
