= Bryngwran =

Village and community in Anglesey, Wales

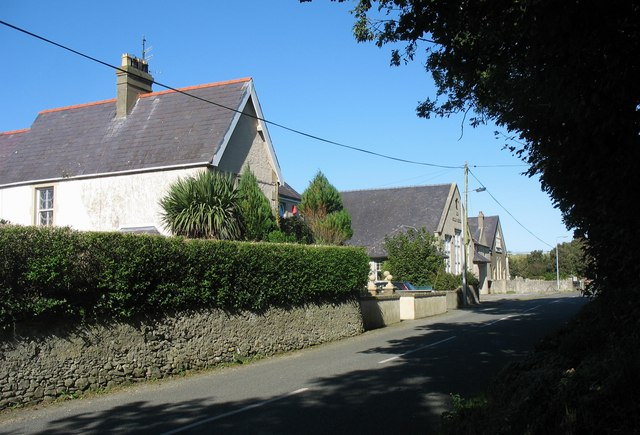
- Capel Hebron

- Location within Anglesey
- Population: 894 (2011)
- OS grid reference: SH3477
- Community: Bryngwran
- Principal area: Anglesey
- Preserved county: Gwynedd
- Country: Wales
- Sovereign state: United Kingdom
- Post town: HOLYHEAD
- Postcode district: LL65
- Dialling code: 01407
- Police: North Wales
- Fire: North Wales
- Ambulance: Welsh
- UK Parliament: Ynys Môn
- Senedd Cymru – Welsh Parliament: Bangor Conwy Môn
- List of places UK Wales Anglesey 53.269°N 4.483°W Map of the community

Bryngwran is a village and community in Anglesey Wales, located on the A5 trunk road. It lies 8.1 miles (13.0 km) west of Llangefni, 7.0 miles (11.3 km) south west of Llannerch-y-medd and 7.4 miles (11.9 km) south east of Holyhead, and includes the villages of Bryngwran, Capel Gwyn and Engedi.

== Demographics ==
At the 2001 census the community had a population of 781, increasing to 894 at the 2011 census. The village itself has a population of around 400.

== Landmarks ==
Saint Peulan's Church stands in an isolated position at Llanbeulan, in the south east of the community. A medieval building, it partly dates from the 12th century, but was extended in the 14th, and restored in the mid-19th century. The gritstone font dates from late 12th century. It is considered an example of a "rural medieval church retaining its simple character" and is Grade II* listed.

Pandy Treban, a former fulling mill in the north of the community, and the 18th-century bridge at Pont Factory Cymunod, over the Afon Crigyll on the border with Bodedern, are Grade II listed.

== Governance ==
An electoral ward in the same name existed. This stretched beyond the confines of Bryngwran Community with a total population taken at the 2011 census of 1,903.

Following the Isle of Anglesey (Electoral Arrangements) Order 2012 the ward was amalgamated into a new multi-councillor ward, Canolbarth Môn.

== Education ==
The village is served by Ysgol Gymuned Bryngwran, a school which has been present in the village since at least the 1930s. A second school, Ysgoldy Hebron, previously existed in the village; it was opened in 1939 as a Sunday School and was later used as a village hall before being listed for sale in 2023.

== Culture and community ==
The village has one public house, the Iorwerth Arms, which was re-opened in 2014 as a community-run business.

== Religious sites ==
Holy Trinity church is present in Bryngwran village, in the parish of Bro Cwyfan. Salem Chapel, a Welsh Independent chapel, was built in the village in the 1820s and was renovated in 1900. The chapel was still in use in 1998.

== Notable people ==
- Alun Michael (born 1943), politician, born in Bryngwran. He served as First Minister of Wales and leader of Welsh Labour from May 1999 to February 2000, Member of Parliament for Cardiff South and Penarth from 1987 to 2012, and Police and Crime Commissioner for South Wales since 2012.
- David Wrench, a Welsh musician, songwriter, producer, and mixer, has collaborated with artists such as Frank Ocean, The Proclaimers, and David Byrne.
