= List of Welsh saints =

This list of Welsh saints includes Christian saints with Welsh connections, either because they were of Welsh origin and ethnicity or because they travelled to Wales from their own homeland and became noted in their hagiography for their work there. (Note: A small number may have had no Welsh connection in their lifetime but have nonetheless become associated with Wales through the depositing of their relics in Welsh religious houses during the Middle Ages.)

The pagan Celts of Britain had already been extensively Christianized during the Roman period: although only four victims of Diocletian's persecution are now known (Saints Alban, "Amphibalus", and Julius and Aaron), (Note: Although note the etiological legend that Lichfield received its name from having been the site of a martyrdom of thousands under Diocletian.) Britons met the pagan Saxon invaders largely as Christians prior to being driven back to Wales, Cornwall, and Brittany. The family of Vortigern, which continued to hold Powys in the early medieval period, produced numerous saints. Although they largely refrained from missionizing among the Germans, Welsh refugees and missionaries were responsible for the Christianization of Ireland and Brittany.

The title of "saint" was used quite broadly in the Celtic churches. Extreme cases are Irish accounts of Gerald of Mayo's presiding over 3300 "saints" and Welsh claims that Bardsey held the remains of 20 000. (Note: The Bollandists compiling the Acta Sanctorum were even driven to complain of the Irish "canonising dead men in troops whenever they seemed to be somewhat better than usual".) More often, the title was given to the founder of any ecclesiastical settlement, which would thenceforth be known as their llan. Such communities were organized on tribal models: founding saints were almost invariably lesser members of local dynasties and their successors chosen from among their kin. The golden age of such establishments was the 6th century, when the "Three Saintly Families of Wales"—those of the invading Irish Brychan and Northerners Cunedda and Caw—displaced many of the local Silurian rulers in favor of their families and clans. By some estimates, these traditions produced over 800 pre-congregational saints venerated locally in Wales, but invasions by Saxons, Irishmen, Vikings, Normans, and others destroyed many ecclesiastical records. Similarly, the distance from Rome, suspicion of Celtic Christianity, and the relative disconnect of the local sees from Rome has left only two Welsh saints in the General Roman Calendar: Saints David (Dewi) and Winifred (Gwenffrewi).

== List of saints ==
Name	fl.	Shrine or Associated Church	Saint's Day (Gŵyl Mabsant)	Royal origins	Notes
Aaron of Aleth	6th century	Cézembre (Brittany)	22 June (trad.)	—	Mentor of Saint Malo
Aaron of Caerleon	3rd century 4th century	Caerleon	1 July (trad.); 20 June (mod.)	—	Martyred with Saint Julius
Adwen or Adwenna	5th century 6th century	Advent (Cornwall)		Daughter of Brychan, king of Brycheiniog	Sometimes conflated with Saint Dwynwen
Aeddan Foeddog or Aidan or Maedoc	6th century 7th century	Ferns (Ireland); Enniscorthy (Ireland)	31 January (trad.)	Son of Saint Aneurin, son of Caw (Note: Although note that Irish sources make him a son of Sedna, a chieftain of Connaught. Baring-Gould considered that the extraordinary span of events credited to "Saint Aeddan" best explained by supposing that Aeddan the grandson of Caw and companion of Saint David was a second figure from Aeddan, son of Sedna, and the two became confused as both were bishops of Ferns a generation apart.)	"Aeddan Maedoc"; Disciple of Saint David
Aelhaiarn or Aelhaearn	7th century	Guilsfield; Llanaelhaearn	2 November (trad.)	Descendant of Vortigern, king of Britain	Brother of Saints Cynhaiarn and Llwchaiarn; Disciple of Saint Beuno
Aerdeyrn	6th century	Llanelldeyrn		Descendant of Vortigern, king of Britain	Brother of Saint Ederyn
Aelrhiw			9 September (trad.)		
Afan of Builth or Afan Buellt	6th century	Llanafan Fawr; Llanfechan; Llanafan	17 or 16 November (trad.)	Great-grandson of Cunedda Wledig, king of Gwynedd	Bishop and martyr Cousin of Saint David
Amphibalus	3rd century 4th century	St Albans	25 June (trad.)		Priest; converted Saint Alban; Born in Isca (Caerleon)
Ane				Child of Caw, king of Strathclyde	
Saint Armel or Arthfael or Armagilus	6th century	Plouharnel (Morbihan, Brittany); Saint-Armel (Morbihan, Brittany), Plouarzel, (Finistère, Brittany).	16 August	Son of Hoel, king of Brittany	
Asaph	6th century	St Asaph	1 May (trad.); 5 May		Bishop
Bach	7th century	Eglwys Fach (Note: Now dedicated to St Martin and probably originally simply a corruption of eglwys y fach, "church in the little [corner of the valley]".)			Hermit; Probably spurious
Baglan	6th century	Baglan		Son of Ithel Hael, prince of Armorica	
Baglan	7th century	Llanfaglan			Son of Dingad
Baruc or Barruc	6th century		27 September or 29 November (trad.)		
Beuno or Bono	7th century	Clynnog Fawr	21 or 22 April (trad.)	Descendant of Vortigern, king of Britain	Abbot; Uncle of Saint Winifred
Bidofydd			26 April (trad.)		With Saint Fidalis
Bieuzi	6th century		24 November		Disciple of Gildas
Bleddyn or Bleiddian or Lupus			29 July (trad.)		Bishop
Bodfan			2 January (trad.)		
Brannoc or Brannock	6th century	Braunton	7 January or 26 June		
Brioc	5th century				Founder saint of Brittany
Brothen		Llanfrothen	15 or 14 October (trad.)		
Brychan Brycheiniog	5th century			King of Brycheiniog	Venerated in his generation but of disputed status now. Husband of Prawst; In Wales, considered the father of Dwynwen; in Cornwall, considered the father of Adwen.
Brynach or Byrnach			7 April (trad.)		Abbot; The translation of his relics was sometimes celebrated separately on 26 June.
Buan			4 August (trad.)		
Bugi or Beugi or Bywgi or Hywgi	6th century			Son of Gwynllyw, king of Gwynllwg	Father of Beuno and brother of Cadoc
Cadfan	6th century	Llangadfan	1 November (trad.)	Grandson of Budic II of Brittany	Founding abbot of Tywyn and Bardsey abbeys
Cadfarch			24 October (trad.)		
Cadoc or Catwg	5th century	Caerleon	24 January (trad.)		Abbot of Llancarfan
Cadwaladr Fendigaid or Cadwalader	7th century	Llangadwaladr; Llangadwaladr	12 November (trad.)	Son of Cadwallon, king of Gwynedd	"Cadwalader the Blessed"; King of Gwynedd
Caffo	6th century	Llangaffo		Child of King Caw of Strathclyde	
Caian		Tregaian	25 September (trad.)		
Saint Cain or Keyne or Ceinwen	5th century	Cerrigceinwen; Llangeinwen	8 October (trad.)	Child of King Caw of Strathclyde	Chiefly worked in Cornwall
Callwen			1 November (trad.)		Virgin
Cammarch			8 October (trad.)		
Caradog or Caradoc	12th century	Lawrenny	13 April (trad.)	Noble of Brecknockshire	Hermit
Carannog or Carantoc	6th century	Llangrannog; Crantock (Cornwall)	15, 16, 17 May, or 15 Jan (trad. (Note: Sometimes celebrated as a movable feast on the Sunday closest to 16 May.))	Great-grandson of Ceredig, king of Ceredigion	
Caron	Possibly 3rd century	Tregaron	5 March (trad.)	Possibly the same as Carausius (Roman name). However, Baring-Gould associates him with Ciaran	Bishop or King
Cathan or Cathen		St Cathan's Chapel; Colonsay & Luing; Gigha	17 May (trad.)		
Cedol			1 November (trad.)		
Saint Ceidio				Child of King Caw of Strathclyde	
Ceitho			5 August (trad.)		
Celynin	6th century	Llangelynnin	20 November (trad.)	Son of Prince Helig	
Ceneu		Clydau	15 June (trad.)	Son of Corun	Bishop of St David's
Cenydd or Cennydd or Kenneth	6th century	Llangennith; Languidic (Brittany)	5 July	Son of "King Dihoc" (presumably Deroch II of Domnonée)	
Cennych	6th century	Llangennych			
Cewydd	5th century	Aberedw; Lancaut; Laleston	1, 2 or 15 July (trad.)	Child of King Caw of Strathclyde	
Cian	6th century	Llangian	11 December (trad.)		
Cieran or Ciarán of Saigir or Kieran	5th century 6th century	Saighir (Ireland)	5 March (trad.)	Son of Lugna, a noble of the Osraige	An apostle of Ireland; Bishop of Saighir
Ciwa or Cigwa or Kywa or Kew		St Kew (Cornwall)	6 or 8 February (trad.)		Virgin; sister of St Docco
Clydai			1 November (trad.)		Virgin
Clydog or Clintacus			19 August or 3 Nov (trad.)		King
Clydwyn or Cledwyn	6th century	Penmachno (formerly)	1 November (trad.)	Son of Brychan, king of Brycheiniog	King
Clydyn or Clydau			3 November (trad.)		
Collen	7th century	Llangollen; Langolen (France)	21 or 22 May (trad.)		
Colman					
Corentin	5th century				First bishop of Quimper
Cowdra or Cawrdaf			5 December or 21 Feb (trad.)		King
Creirwy	5th century			Great-granddaughter of Brychan, king of Brycheiniog, granddaughter of Budic II	
Cristiolus			3 December (trad.)		
Cubert see Gwbert	8th century				
Curig	6th century 7th century		16 or 15 June (trad.)		Martyr; Celebrated with St Julitta
Cwyfen			3 or 2 or 4 June (trad.)		
Cwyllog	6th century	Llangwyllog		Child of Caw, king of Strathclyde	
Cybi	6th century		5, 6 or 7 November, or 13 Aug (trad.)	Abbot; Descended from both Seithenyn, king of Gwyddno, & Brychan, king of Brycheiniog	
Cyllin	1st century			Son of Caratacus	King of Siluria; Father of King Coel
Cynbryd			19 or 20 March (trad.)		Martyr
Cynddilig			1 November (trad.)		
Cyndeyrn or Kentigern or Mungo	6th century 7th century	Glasgow	13 January or 25 Jul (trad.)	Son of Owain, king of Rheged, and Saint Teneu	Bishop of St Asaph, Hoddom, & Glasgow
Cynfab			15 November (trad.)		
Cynfarch		Llanfair Dyffryn Clwyd	8 September (trad.)		
Cynfarwy	7th century	Llechgynfarwy	8, 10 or 11 November (trad.)		
Cyngar or Congar	6th century	Holyhead; Llangefni	7 November (trad.)	Child of Gerren Llyngesog of Dumnonia	Abbot
Cynhafal			5 October (trad.)		
Cynidr	7th century	Glasbury	8 December (trad.)	Grandson of Brychan, king of Brycheiniog	Bishop; Son of Saint Gwladys and brother of Saint Eigon
Cynllo	5th century 6th century	Llangoedmor	17 or 14 July or 8 Aug (trad.)	Grandson of King Coel	King
Cynog			14 or 8 March or 9 Oct (trad.)		Martyr
Cywair			11 July (trad.)		
Cynwyl		Cynwyl Elfed; Cynwyl Gaeo	30 April (trad.)	Descended from Brychan, king of Brycheiniog	
David or Dewi Sant	6th century	St David's	1 March (trad.)	Great-grandson of Seithenyn, king of Gwyddno, & of Brychan, king of Brycheiniog	Patron Saint of Wales
Decuman or Degyman	7th century	Watchet (England); Williton (England)	27 or 30 August (trad.); 27 February		Martyr
Deifer or Dier			8 March (trad.)		
Deiniol or Daniel	6th century	Bangor	11 September or 10 Dec (trad.)		Bishop
Deiniolen			22 or 23 November (trad.)		
Derfel Gadarn	6th century	Llandderfel	5 May (trad.)		
Deruvian or Duvian or Damian	2nd century	Merthyr Dyfan (mistakenly); Llandyfan (mistakenly)	24 May (trad.)		Bishop & Confessor; Usually celebrated with St Fagan, with whom he supposedly evangelized Roman Britain at King Lucius's request Often (mistakenly) conflated with St Dyfan on the authority of Williams
Digain			21 November (trad.)		
Dilwar			4 February (trad.)		Virgin
Dingad	5th century	Llandovery	1 November (trad.)	Son of Brychan, king of Brycheiniog	
Diryng	5th century			Child of Caw, king of Strathclyde	
Dochelin			8 July (trad.)		
Dochau or Dochow or Dochwy or Dogwyn or Docco	5th century	Llandough, Cowbridge; Llandough, Penarth; St Kew (Cornwall)	15 February (trad.)		
Doged		Llanddoged		Descendant of Cunedda according to the tale of Culhwch and Olwen	Martyr
Dogfael			31 October or 14 Jun (trad.)		
Dogfan or Doewan	5th century		13 or 12 July (trad.)	Son of Brychan, king of Brycheiniog	Martyr
Dominica	8th century		8 May		
Dona or Dwna		Llandona	1 November (trad.)		
Dubhán	5th century		St Dubhán's Church, Hook Head (Ireland)		
Dunod or Dunawd	6th century 7th century		7 September (trad.)		Abbot
Dwynwen or Dweynween	5th century		25 January or 13 Jul (trad.)	Daughter of Brychan, king of Brycheiniog	Virgin
Dwywe	6th century				
Dyfan		Merthyr Dyfan; Llandyfan	24 May (trad.)		Highly obscure Presumably martyred Generally confused with St Deruvian
Dyfnan	5th century	Llanddyfnan	22 or 24 April (trad.)	Alleged son of Brychan, king of Brycheiniog	
Dyfnog		Llanrhaeadr-yng-Nghinmeirch	13 February (trad.)		
Dyfodwg	6th century	Llantrisant	25 June		
Dyfrig or Dubricius	5th century 6th century		14 November (trad.)		Abbot; The translation of his relics was sometimes separately celebrated on 29 May.
Edeyrn or Edern	6th century	Llanedeyrn	11 November or 6 Jan (trad.)	Descendant of Vortigern, king of Britain	
Edwen			6 November (trad.)		Virgin
Egwad	7th century	Llangwad; Llanfynydd			
Eigen	1st century	Llanigon			
Eigion			10 September (trad.)		Bishop
Eigon	7th century	Llanigon		Grandson of Brychan Brycheiniog	Son of Saint Gwladys, brother of Saint Cynidr
Eigrad	6th century	Llaneugrad		Child of Caw, king of Strathclyde	
Eigron	5th century	Llanigon (Cornwall)		Child of Caw, king of Strathclyde	
Eilian	6th century	Llaneilian	13 January (Orth.)		A Roman who emigrated to Anglesey to live as a hermit
Eirw	5th century 6th century	Eglwyswrw			Female saint
Einion Frenin	5th century 6th century	Llanengan	9 or 10 February (trad.)	Descendant of Cunedda, king of Gwynedd	"Einion the King": King of Llŷn (and possibly Anglesey); Brother of Saints Meirion and Seiriol
Elaeth or Eleth	6th century	Amlwch	10 or 11 November (trad.)		King of a realm in northern Britain who fled to Wales
Elen	4th century			Daughter of Eudaf Hen	Wife of Magnus Clemens Maximus; Married into the family of Brychan
Elfan			26 September (trad.)		
Elfin		Warrington (England)			
Elian or Elien	5th century	Llanelian	13 January (trad.)		
Elledeyrn	4th century			Descendant of Vortigern, king of Britain	
Elli	6th century	Llanelli	23 January (trad.)		Abbot
Saint Eluned or Eiliwedd or Almedha	5th century	Slwch Tump	1 August (trad.)	Daughter of Brychan, king of Brycheiniog	Martyr and virgin
Elvis of Eilfyw or Ailbe	6th century	St Elvis			
Elwad			22 March (trad.)		
Elyw or Eliw			14 or 17 July (trad.)		
Enddwyn		Ffynnon Enddwyn, Llanenddwyn			
Endelienta or Endellion	5th century 6th century	Church of St Endelienta, St Endellion (Cornwall)		Daughter of Brychan, king of Brycheiniog	
Enoder		St Enoder (Cornwall)			
Enodoch	6th century		7 March		
Erbin	5th century		29 May or 13 Jan (trad.)		King of Dumnonia
Erfyl or Urfyl		Llanerfyl	6 July (trad.)		
Eugrad	6th century			Child of Caw, king of Strathclyde	
Eurgain			29 June (trad.)		
Ewryd			31 January (trad.)		
Fagan or Ffagan or Fugatius	2nd century	St Fagans	24 May or 8 Aug (trad.); 26 May		Bishop & Confessor; Usually celebrated with St Deruvian, with whom he supposedly evangelized Roman Britain at King Lucius's request Often (mistakenly) connected with St Dyfan on the authority of Williams
Ffinian or Finian	5th century		23 February		
Ffraid or Bridget or Bride or Bhrid	5th century 6th century	Llansantffraed; Llansantffraid; Llansantffraid-ym-Mechain Llansantffraid Glan Conwy	1 February (trad.)		Irish patron saint. Nun and abbess.
Fidalis			26 April (trad.)		With Saint Bidofydd
Finan of Ffinan	6th century		17 or 13 February or 11 Dec (trad.); 18 March		Bishop
Flewyn or Fflewin or Fflewyn	6th century	Llanfflewin	12 December (trad.)	Son of Ithel Hael	
Foeddog or Maeddog or Maedoc	6th century			Child of Caw, king of Strathclyde	
Gafran	6th century				Son-in-law of Brychan, king of Brycheiniog
Gallgo			27 November (trad.)		
Gallo	5th century			Child of Caw, king of Strathclyde	
Garmon or Germanus of Auxerre	4th century	Llanarmon-yn-Iâl	31, 13, 14 or 30 July, or 1 Oct or 27 or 28 May (trad.)		Bishop; Credited with leading an army of Britons against invading Picts
Gelert	7th century	Llangeler; Beddgelert	29 June		
Gildas or Aneurin	c. 500–570			Child of Caw, king of Strathclyde.	Possibly the poet Aneirin. Credited in Wales as the father of Saint Aeddan|
Gistilian or Gistlian			2 or 4 March (trad.)		Bishop
Gofor			9 May (trad.)		
Gollen or Colin		Llangollen			
Govan	6th century	St. Govan's Head			
Gredifael	6th century	Penmynydd	13 or 22 November (trad.)	Son of Ithel Hael	
Grwst			1 December (trad.)		
Guirec	6th century	Perros-Guirec			
Gurthiern	5th century	Quimperlé	3 July	Cousin of Vortigern, king of Britain	
Gwalehes or Gualehes, gwalch(es)	6th century	Llandaff			Was either disciple of Cadoc, or disciple of Barruc. Died alongside Barruc and buried on Ynys Echni (William Camden thought that Barruc might have been the disciple of Gwalehes)
Gwbert	8th century	Gwbert-on-Sea	4 October (trad.)	Venerated also at Cubert, Cornwall; Cubert is said to have been a monk who came from Wales and assisted Carantoc in evangelizing that district; later returned to his monastery and became abbot and died in 775 AD; feast at Cubert is on Sunday following 4 Oct.	
Gwen or Wenna	5th century				Wife of Salomon of Cornwall; Mother of Saint Cybi & aunt of Saint David
Gwenafwy	6th century		1 July	Daughter of Caw, king of Strathclyde	
Gwenfaen			3, 4 or 5 November (trad.)		Virgin
Gwenfyl			1 November (trad.)		Virgin
Gwynhoedl			1 January (trad.)		
Gwenllian	5th century			Daughter of Brychan, king of Brycheiniog	Great-grandmother of Saints Deinol and Cynwl
Gwenlleu			1 November (trad.)		Bishop
Gwenllwyfo	7th century	Llanwenllwyfo			
Gwenog			3 January (trad.)		Virgin
Gwenrhiw			1 November (trad.)		Virgin
Gwladys	6th century			Daughter of Brychan, king of Brycheiniog	Queen of Gwynllyw; Mother of saints Cynidr and Eigon
Gwrda			5 December (trad.)		
Gwrddelw		Llanddewi Brefi	7 January (trad.)	Child of Caw, king of Strathclyde	
Gwrfyw		Bangor (formerly)		Son of Pasgen	
Gwrhai	5th century			Child of Caw, king of Strathclyde	
Gwrnerth			7 April (trad.)		With Saint Llywelyn
Gwrthwl or Mwthwl			2 March (trad.)		
Gwyrd			1 November (trad.)		Friar
Gwyddelan			22 August (trad.)		
Gwyddfarch			3 November (trad.)		
Gwynan or Gwynen			13 December (trad.)		Commemorated with Saint Gwynws; Conflated with Saint Gwynin
Gwynin		Dwygyfylchi	31 December (trad.)		
Gwynllyw Filwr or Gundleus (Eng Woolos or Woolo)	5th century	Newport Cathedral, St Woolos	29 or 28 February (trad.); 29 March (mod.)	King of Gwynllwg	Husband of Gwladys, father of Cadoc and others
Gwynno	6th century	Llantrisant; Llanwynno	26 October		
Gwynog			22, 23 or 24 October (trad.)		Commemorated with Saint Noethon
Gwynws			13 December (trad.)		Commemorated with Saint Gwynan
Henwg	5th century	Llanhennock			Supposed links to King Arthur and Constantine
Huail	6th century			Son of Caw, king of Strathclyde	
Hychan			8 August (trad.)		
Hywel	6th century	Llanhywel; Llanllowell		Son of Emyr Llydaw, king of Brittany	King
Idloes		Llanidloes	6 September (trad.)		
Iestyn	6th century 7th century	Llaniestyn; Llaniestyn			
Ilar or Hilary	6th century	Llanilar; Trefilan	13, 14 or 15 January (trad.)	—	Martyr; Possibly Bretish companion of Saint Cadfan
Ilid		Llanilid			
Illog			8 August (trad.)		
Illtud or Illtyd	5th century	Llantwit Major	6 November (trad.)		
Ina	5th century	Llanina	1 February (trad.)	Granddaughter of Cunedda Wledig, king of Gwynedd	
Isan	6th century	Llanishen			Disciple of Saint Illtyd
Isfael or Ismael	6th century	St Ishmaels	16 June (trad.)	Son of Budig	Bishop; Disciple of Saint David
Issel	6th century	Saundersfoot			Father of Saints Gwen Teirbron and Teilo; Grandfather of Euddogwy, Tyfei, Isfael, Gwenthenoc, Jacut, Winwaloe
Issui			30 October (trad.)		Martyr
Ithel Hael	6th century				Prince of Armorica; Father of numerous saints
Jacut	5th century	Saint-Jacut-de-la-Mer			Great-grandson of Brychan Brycheiniog
John Roberts	1577–1610		25 October		Monk and priest Born Trawsfynydd, 1577; Martyred at Tyburn 1610
John Lloyd	?–1679		25 October		Priest and martyr Executed Cardiff, 1679
Julitta			16 or 15 June (trad.)		Martyr; Celebrated with St Curig
Julius	4th century	Caerleon	1 July (trad. 20 June (mod.)		Martyred with Saint Aaron of Caerleon
Justinian or Stinan	6th century	Llanstinan; Saint David's	5 December (trad.)		
Juthwara	6th century	Sherborne Abbey			Sister of Saints Sidwell and Wulvela
Keina			7 October (trad.)		Virgin
Kevoca					
Llamined Angel	7th century			Son of Pasgen	Claimed by Venedotian tribes Brother of Saint Gwrfyw
Llawddog or Lleuddad			15 January (trad.)		Abbot
Llechid	6th century	Llanllechid	1 December (trad.)	Child of Ithel Hael	
Llibio	5th century		28 February (trad.)		
Llily	7th century		3 March		
Llwchaiarn or Lluwchaiarn	7th century		12 or 11 January (trad.)		
Llwydian			19 November (trad.)		
Llwni			11 August (trad.)		
Llyr			21 October (trad.)		Virgin
Llywelyn			7 April or 12 Dec (trad.)		With Saint Gwrnerth
Lythan		St Lythans			
Mabyn or Mabena	5th century	St Mabyn (Cornwall)		Daughter of Brychan, king of Brycheiniog	
Machraith			1 January (trad.)		
Madoc	7th century		31 January		
Madron	6th century	Madron (Cornwall)	17 May		
Madrun or Materiana	5th century				
Maël	5th century 6th century	Corwen	13 or 12 May (trad.)		Hermit; Celebrated with St Sulien
Maelog	6th century	Llanfaelog	31 December (trad.)	Child of Caw, king of Strathclyde	
Maelrhys or Maelrys or Maelerw		Bardsey Island	1 January (trad.)		
Maethlu			26 December (trad.)		
Maidoc			28 February (trad.)		Bishop; Not to be conflated with Aeddan Foeddog of Ferns
Mallonius	4th century	Rouen	22 October		
Saint Malo or Machudd or Machutus	5th century		15 November (trad.)		Disciple of Saint Aaron
Mannacus	6th century				
Marnock	6th century				
Materiana or Madrun or Madryn	5th century	Minster (Cornwall)	9 April	Daughter of Saint Vortimer, king of Gwent	
Mawgan	5th century		8 August		
Mawnan	7th century		18 December		
Mechell or Mechyll	6th century	Llanfechell	15 or 14 November (trad.)		Possibly Bretish
Meddwid or Moddwid			27 August (trad.)		
Medwy			1 January (trad.)		Bishop
Meilig	6th century	Llowes	14 or 12 November (trad.)	Child of Caw, king of Strathclyde	
Meirion or Meirian			4 February (trad.)		
Melaine	6th century	St Mellion; Mullion			
Melangell or Monacella	6th century	Pennant Melangell	27 May or 4 or 31 Jan (trad.)		Virgin; Abbess
Mellonius	4th century		22 October		
Melyd or Melydyn			9 May (trad.)		
Menefrida	5th century	St Minver (Cornwall)		Daughter of Brychan, king of Brycheiniog	
Merin or Merryn	6th century	St Merryn; Lanmerin; Plomelin	6 January (trad.)	Child of Seithenyn, king of Gwyddno	
Mereweenna	6th century		6 July	Daughter of Brychan, king of Brycheiniog	
Mordeyrn			25 July (trad.)		
Mylling			17 June (trad.)		
Mylor or Melor	6th century		1 October		
Meugan			25 or 26 September, 14 Feb, 24 or 15 Apr or 18 Nov (trad.)		
Morhaiarn			1 November (trad.)		
Mwrog			24 or 26 September (trad.)		
Mynver	6th century		4 November		
Nectan	5th century	Hartland (England)		Eldest son of Brychan, king of Brycheiniog	
Nidan	7th century	Llanidan	30 September (trad.)	Grandchild of Pasgen	
Noethan or Noethon			22, 23 or 24 October (trad.)		Commemorated with Saint Gwynog
Non or Nonita	5th century	Chapel of St Non; Altarnun (Cornwall)	3 March (trad.)	Great-granddaughter of Seithenyn, king of Gwyddno	Mother of Saint David
Noyale	6th century		6 July		
Oudoceus	7th century	Llandaff; Llandogo	2 July (trad.)		Bishop
Pabo Post Prydain			9 November (trad.)		
Padarn	6th century	Llanbadarn Fawr	16, 15 or 17 April or 12 Nov (trad.)		Founder saint of Brittany; Bishop; His ordination was also sometimes celebrated as a separate holiday on 23 September.
Padrig or Patrick			17 March		Patron saint of Ireland; Bishop
Patern	5th century				Companion of Saint David
Paulinus	6th century				Founder saint of Brittany
Peblig	5th century	Llanbeblig	3 or 2 July (trad.)	Son of Magnus Clemens Maximus	Son of Saint Elen Luyddog
Pedrog or Petroc or Petrock	6th century	Bodmin (Cornwall)	4 June (trad.)		Patron saint of Cornwall; Abbot
Peirio	5th century 6th century	Rhosbeirio		Child of Caw, king of Strathclyde	
Peris	6th century	Nant Peris	11 December or 26 Jul (trad.)	Child of Helig of Tyno Helig	
Peulan	6th century	Llanbeulan	2 or 1 November (trad.)		
Pol Aurelian	5th century			Son of Porphyrius	Student of Saint Iltud; Bishop
Philip Evans	1645–1679		25 October		Priest and martyr Born Monmouth, 1645; Executed Cardiff, 1679
Polin			22 November (trad.)		Bishop
Pyr	6th century	Caldey Island			
Rhediw			11 November (trad.)		
Rhian			8 March (trad.)		Bishop
Rhuddlad			4 September (trad.)		Virgin
Rhwydrys			1 November (trad.)		
Rhychwyn	5th century	Llanrhychwyn	12 June (trad.)		Brother of Celynin
Rhystyd	6th century	Llanrhystud	Thursday in the Ember Week before Christmas		Dafydd ap Gwilym associates Rhystyd with Dwynwen in Yr Hun Felys.
Richard Gwyn	1537-15 October 1584	Wrexham	17 October		Martyr
Sadwrn	6th century		29 November (trad.); 25 October		
Saeran			13 January (trad.)		
Samson of Dol	5th century				
Samson of York	6th century		28 July (trad.)	Son of Caw, king of Strathclyde	Bishop
Sannan or Sanan			13 or 7 June or 8 Mar or 29 Apr (trad.)		
Sawyl or Saul			15 January (trad.)		
Sefin	5th century			Daughter of Brychan, king of Brycheiniog	Grandmother of Saints David and Cybi
Seiriol	6th century	Penmon; Puffin Island	1 February (trad.)	Descended from Cunedda, king of Gwynedd	Brother of Saints Einion Frenin and Meirion; Abbot at Penmon
Sidwell or Sativola	6th century	Exeter, Devon	31 July		Sister of Saints Juthwara and Wulvela
Silin or Giles			1 September or 1 Oct or 27 Jan (trad.)		Abbot or bishop
Sulien			2 September (trad.)		
Tanwg	6th century	Llandanwg		Son of Ithel Hael	
Tathan or Tatheus	6th century		26 December (trad.)		Abbot; Irish missionary to Wales
Tathana	5th century			Granddaughter of Meuric ap Tewdric of Trebeferad	Associated with Saint Iltud
Tathyw	5th century	Caerwent; St Athan			
Teath	5th century	St Teath (Cornwall)		Daughter of Brychan, king of Brycheiniog	
Tecwyn or Tegwyn	6th century	Llandecwyn	14 September (trad.)	Son of Ithel Hael	
Tegai	6th century	Llandygai		Son of Ithel Hael	
Tegfedd or Tegwedd	6th century	Llandegveth	18 December (trad.)		Virgin
Tegla or Tecla		Llandegla	1 or 3 June or 23 or 24 Sept (trad.)		Virgin
Teilo	6th century	Llantilio Crossenny; Llantilio Pertholey; Llandeilo Fawr	9 or 7 February or 26 Nov (trad.)	Child of Brychan, king of Brycheiniog	Bishop
Teneu	6th century	Glasgow		Daughter of Lleuddun, king of Gododdin	Mother of Saint Cyndeyrn; Great-grandmother of Saint Winifred
Teulyddog	6th century				Disciple of Dyfrig
Teuderius			29 October (trad.)		
Tewdrig	6th century		3 January (trad.); 1 April		King and martyr
Tigernach	6th century		4 April		
Trillo	6th century	Llandrillo in Denbighshire; Llandrillo-yn-Rhos	15 June (trad.)	Son of Ithel Hael	Disciple of Saint Cadfan
Trunio			29 June (trad.)		
Tudno	6th century	Llandudno	5 June (trad.)	Son of Seithenyn, king of Gwyddno	
Tudglyd or Tudglud	6th century	Llandudno; Penmachno	30 May (trad.)	Son of Seithenyn, king of Gwyddno	
Tudur			14 or 15 October (trad.)		
Tudwal	5th century			Son of Hoel and cousin of the king of Domnonee	Bishop
Twrog	6th century	Bodwrog; Maentwrog; Llandwrog	26 June (trad.)	Son of Ithel Hael	
Tybie	5th century		30 January (trad.)	Daughter of Brychan, king of Brycheiniog	Virgin & martyr
Tydecho		Llanymawddwy	17 December (trad.)		
Tydfil	5th century	Merthyr Tydfil	23 August (trad.)	Daughter of Brychan, king of Brycheiniog	Virgin & martyr
Tyfaelog			26 February (trad.)		
Tyfanog or Tauannauc			25 November (trad.)		
Tyfriog			1 May (trad.)		Abbot
Tyfrydog	5th century	Llandyfrydog	1 January (trad.)		
Tygwy			13 January (trad.)		
Tyneio	6th century	Llanfor		Child of Seithenyn, king of Gwyddno	
Tyrnog		Landerneau (Brittany)	4 or 2 April or 26 Jun or Sept 25 (trad.)		
Tysilio or Tyssilio	7th century	Llandysilio	8 or 9 November (trad.)	Son of Brochwel Ysgithrog	Bishop
Tyssil	7th century	Llandyssil			
Tyssul			31 January or 3 Feb (trad.)		Bishop
Ufelwy	6th century	Yhuel			Grandson of Gildas
Ulo		Capelulo			
Umbrafel				Son of Emyr Llydaw	
Urw or Wrw			21 October (trad.)		Virgin
Ustig				Child of Caw, king of Strathclyde	Associated with Saints Dyfrig and Eldad
Urith	8th century		8 July		
Usyllt	6th century	Tenby		Descendant of Cunedda, king of Gwynedd	Father of Saint Teilo
Veep	5th century	St Veep (Cornwall)		Daughter of Brychan, king of Brycheiniog	
Vortimer or Gwrthefyr Fendigaid	5th century			Descendant of Vortigern, king of Britain	"Vortimer the Blessed"; King of Gwent; Father of Madrun
Weneppa	6th century	Gwennap (Cornwall)		Daughter of Caw, king of Strathclyde	
Winfrith	6th century				Bishop of Lichfield
Winifred or Gwenfrewi or Gwenffrewi	7th century	Holywell	19 or 20 December or 4 Nov (trad.); 8 July	Descendant of Vortigern, king of Britain	Virgin & martyr Granddaughter of Saint Teneu and niece of Saint Beuno; Her decollation was frequently celebrated separately on 22 June. The translation of her relics was frequently celebrated separately on 3 November.
Wethenoc	6th century			Great-grandson of Brychan, king of Brycheiniog	
Winwaloe	6th century			Great-grandson of Brychan, king of Brycheiniog	
Wulvela	6th century				Sister of Saints Juthwara and Sidwell
Ylched or Ulched		Llechylched	6 January or 9 May (trad.); 6 April (Orth.)		
Ystyffan or Stephen	6th century	Llansteffan		Descendant of Vortigern, king of Britain	Associate of Saint Teilo

== Other commemorations ==
- 29 May: The translation of Saint Dyfrig
- 6 June: Y Trisaint, the Three Saints
- 22 June: The decollation of Saint Winifred
- 26 June: The translation of Saint Brynach
- 1 or 2 July: Gwyl y Gwlaw
- 9 September: Gwyl y Ddelw Fyw, the Living Image
- 23 September: The ordination of Saint Padarn
- 21 October: Gwyl y Gweryddon, the Eleven Thousand Virgins
- 3 November: The translation of Saint Winifred
- 11 December: Dydd Ilas Llywelyn, the day on which Llywelyn was slain

== See also ==
- Children of Brychan
- List of Breton saints
- List of Cornish saints
- List of Irish saints
- List of Anglo-Saxon saints
- List of Northumbrian saints
