= Mydans =

Mydans is a surname. Notable people with the surname include:

- Carl Mydans (1907–2004), American photographer
- Shelley Smith Mydans (1915–2002), American novelist, journalist, and prisoner of war, wife of Carl

== See also ==
- Mydan
