= Saint Tathyw =

Welsh saint

Saint Tathyw was a 5th-century saint of South Wales, and founder of a monastic school at Caerwent where he instructed many of the leading figures of the early Welsh church.

== Identity ==
There is considerable controversy over the identity of Saint Tathyw.

- He may or may not have been the same person as Tatheus, who founded a monastery just 10 miles outside Caerwent.
- However a legend from the village of St Athan holds that Tathyw was actually a different person called Tathan the Younger and that he is buried at St Athan Parish Church, although the exact location of the grave is unknown. This person was born Tathyw ap Ynyr about 490 AD the son of Ynyr of Gwent, Grandson of Dynwal of Dyfed and great-grandson of Ednyfed King of Dyfed. His mother was Derwela Ferch Budic, a princess of Brittany.
- Others link him to Saint Tathana, granddaughter of Meuric ap Tewdric of Trebeferad, who lived a humble life as a nun in a mud hut on the River Thaw, and was associated with the monastic school of nearby Llantwit Major.

== Life ==
King Caradog ap Ynyr (possibly the same person as Caradoc Freichfras) of Gwent's main court was originally at Caer-Guent (Caerwent), but he gave the city to St. Tathyw, while the King let his horse lead him to a new home at Portskewett. Tathyw founded a monastery to the Holy Trinity at Caer-Guent. He lived there many years with his followers and when he died he was buried under the floor of his Abbey Church. St. Tathyw's relics at Tewkesbury indicate that he was reinterred in a reverential shrine some time prior to 1235. His monastery may actually have been at Christchurch, eight miles west of Caerwent.

== Legend ==
One story of Tathyw relates that King Gwynllyw of South Wales stole the cow of St. Tathyw. When the monk came to demand the cow's return, the King surrendered his son Cadoc to the saint's care. As a young man, Cadoc received his habit from St. Tathyw and returned to his native country to build a church at Llancarvan and a monastery and college.

It is also conjectured that he may have known King Arthur while at Caerwent.

Another story relates that as a child an angel appeared to Tathyw in a dream and suggested he might spread the Christian word in Wales.
