= Tudglyd =

6th-century Welsh saint

Saint Tudglyd
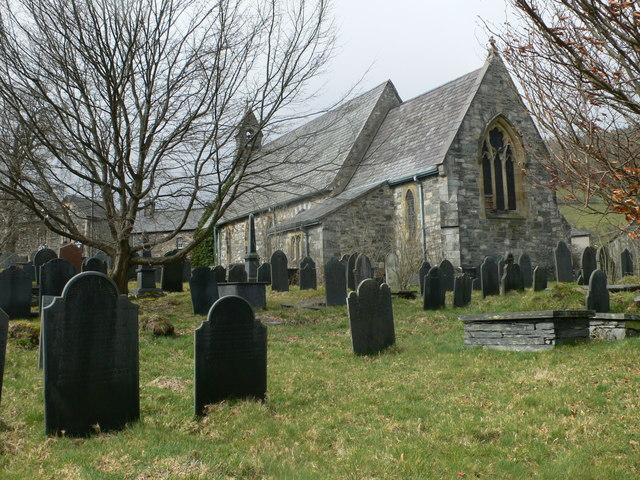
- Penmachno Parish Church
- Born: 6th century Wales
- Died: 6th century
- Venerated in: Church in Wales
- Canonized: Pre-congregation
- Major shrine: St Tudglyd's Church, Penmachno
- Feast: 30 May

Saint Tudglyd (alternatively Tudclud, Tudclyd, Tydclyd, Tudglud, Tutclyt, Tudglyd or Tyddyd) was a 6th-century saint of North Wales, who is said to have been one of the seven sons of King Seithenyn, whose legendary kingdom, Cantre'r Gwaelod in Cardigan Bay, was submerged by the sea. He would therefore be the brother of the saints Gwynhoedl, Merin (or Meirin), Tudno and Senewyr. He is associated with the town of Llandudno. The church of St Tudglyd in Penmachno is dedicated to him. His feast day is 30 May.

He is not to be confused with the female saint Tudglid, who was a daughter of Brychan and the wife of Cyngen Glodrydd.
