= Tyneio =

6th-century Welsh saint

Saint Tyneio was a 6th century Pre-congregational saint of Wales.

Tyneio, was the founder and patron saint of the church at Llandyneio, Wales a daughter church under Llanvarn, Carnarvonshire. and Llanfor Wales.

He was a son of Saithenyn Hen ap Plaws and Great grandson of Vortigen and Great Great Grand son of Magnus Maximus, Emperor of the Roman Empire and Saint Elen Lwyddog 'of the Host'.
