= Setantii =

Pre-Roman community in Britain

The Setantii (sometimes read as Segantii) were a possible pre-Roman Briton people who apparently lived in the western and southern littoral of Lancashire in England. It is thought likely they were a sept or sub-tribe of the Brigantes, who, at the time of the Roman invasion, dominated much of what is now northern England.

== Background ==
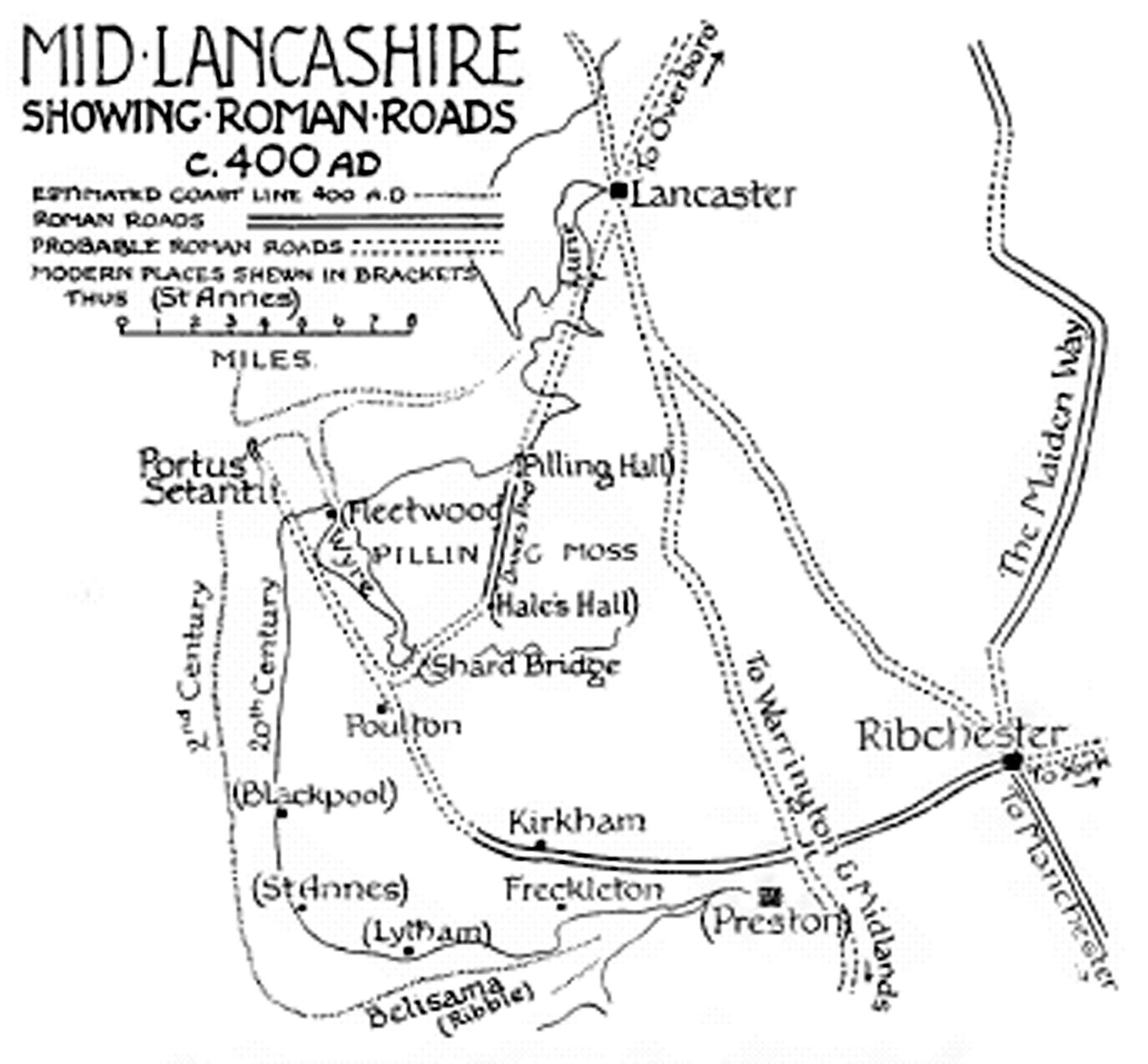
Reconstruction of Roman roads in mid-Lancashire around 400 AD showing possible location of Portus Setantiorum or Portus Setantii

The Setantii name is known from a single source only, the 2nd century Geographia of Ptolemy. Recorded there is the placename Portus Setantiorum (Port of the Setantii). Its precise location remains unknown although various suggestions have been made, including the possibility that it has since been lost to the sea. Some scholars argue that it may have been located in present-day Fleetwood. Also recorded by Ptolemy is the hydronym Seteia, assumed by its position in his text to refer to the River Mersey.

== Links to later Celtic legends ==
Sir John Rhys linked the name of the Setantii with Seithenyn, a figure in Welsh mythology. Seithenyn was a prince with responsibilities over the sea defences of Cantre'r Gwaelod. Drunkenly neglecting his duties one night, the sea overran the kingdom, and it sank beneath Cardigan Bay. Rhys noted the similarities between Setantii, Seithenyn, the Irish Sétanta Beg, and the Breton legends surrounding "Enez-Sizun" and the Lost City of Ys.

Rhys posited that, although the name was Brythonic in origin, the soundings of the later legends left no doubt that "we have in these names distant echoes of an inundation story, once widely current in both Britains (Great Britain and Brittany) and perhaps also in Ireland". Although he acknowledged he was unaware of any similar legend on the Lancashire coast (such as the inundation of Portus Setantiorum), Rhys linked all the later legends back to the Setantii of Lancashire.

Sétanta, the birth name of the Irish legendary figure Cú Chulainn, may also be linked to the Setantii.
