= Tathana =

Welsh saint

Saint Tathana was a 5th-century saint of South Wales. Very little is known of her actual life. She was born c.465 AD and she was the granddaughter of Meuric ap Tewdric of Trebeferad. She lived a humble life as a virgin and hermit in a mud hut on the River Thaw, and was associated with the monastic school of Llantwit Major where she was buried.

There is a tradition that the village of St Athan in the Vale of Glamorgan is named after Tathana, however it is thought that the male Saint Tathan is more probable. The parish church is dedicated to Tathan.
