= Cennych =

Welsh saint

Saint Cennych was a Pre-congregational saint of medieval, South Wales.
He is the patron Saint of Llangennych, Carmarthenshire.

== See also ==
- Llangennech
- Llangennech railway station
- Saints of Wales
