= Ustig =

Welsh Roman Catholic saint

Ustig is a 6th-century Pre-Congregational Saint of Wales.

He was a child of King Caw of Strathclyde, and according to Frederick Holweck, the brother of Aldate, bishop of Gloucester. He appears as "Iustic" in the tale Culhwch and Olwen.

Baring-Gould mentions another Ustig, descended from Cadell Ddyrnllwg, who was a confessor, along with Dyfrig and Eldad, at Cor Garmon at Llancarfan.
