= St Tathan's Church =

Church in St Athan, Vale of Glamorgan, Wales

Coordinates: 51.40251°N 3.41458°W

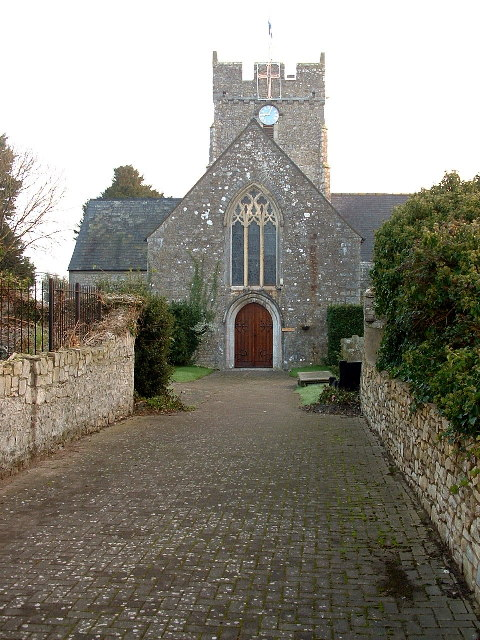
St Tathan Parish Church

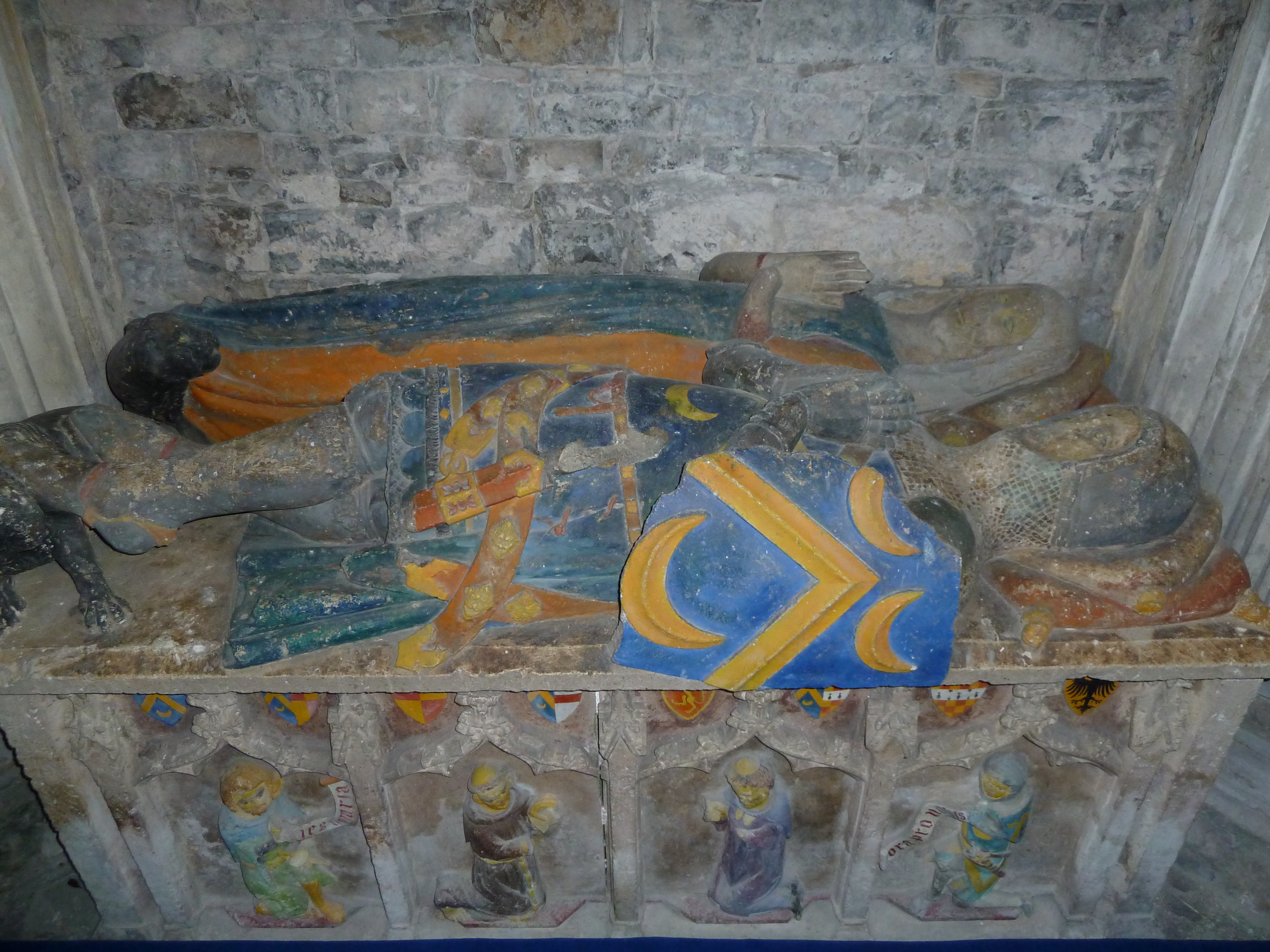
Tomb of Sir Roger Berkerolles (d. 1351) and his wife Katherine Turberville de Coity

St Tathan's Church is a medieval church in St. Athan, in the Vale of Glamorgan, Wales. It is dedicated to Saint Tathan.

== History ==
The building's origins are probably 12th century, but there is little evidence of any 12th-century fabric remaining. The external features are from the 13th and 14th centuries, with 19th century restorations and additions. Inside, there are elaborate monuments to Sir William de Berkerolles (died 1329) and his wife Phelice de Vere, and to his son Sir Roger de Berkerolles (died 1351) and his wife Katherine Turberville de Coity. The font is an unusual tulip-shaped design and is possibly 13th century. There are six bells.

The church became a grade I listed building in 1963. In 2007, it received £58,400 from the Heritage Lottery Fund.

In 2016, three children ages 15, 13, and 10 were arrested on vandalism charges. Police concluded it "...was not a hate crime against any religious belief, but simply mindless vandalism with no motivation behind it..."
