= St Baglan's Church, Llanfaglan =

Coordinates: 53.1210°N 4.3095°W

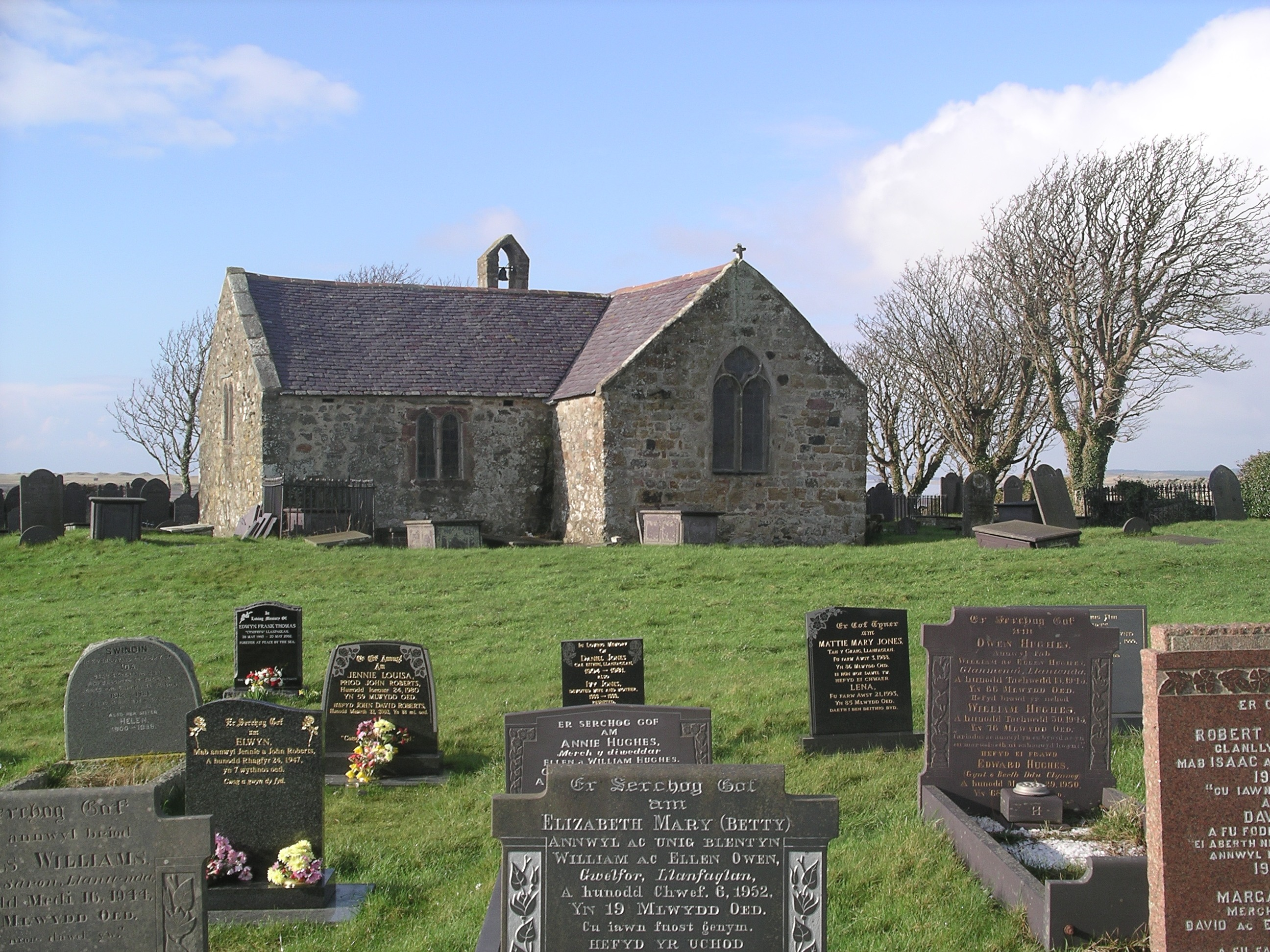
- St Baglan's Church, Llanfaglan, from the southwest

- Location in Gwynedd
- OS grid reference: SH 455 606
- Location: Llanfaglan, Gwynedd
- Country: Wales
- Denomination: Church in Wales
- Website: Friends of Friendless Churches

History
- Dedication: Baglan ap Dingad (Saint Baglan)

Architecture
- Functional status: Redundant
- Heritage designation: Grade I
- Designated: 29 May 1968
- Architectural type: Church
- Groundbreaking: 13th century (probable)
- Completed: 1800

Specifications
- Materials: Stone, slate roofs

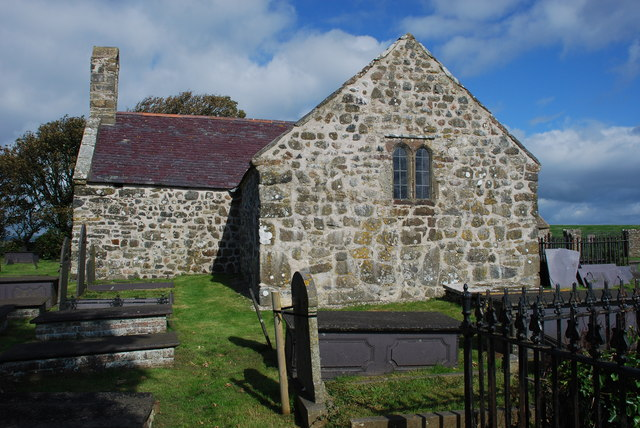
St Baglan's from the west

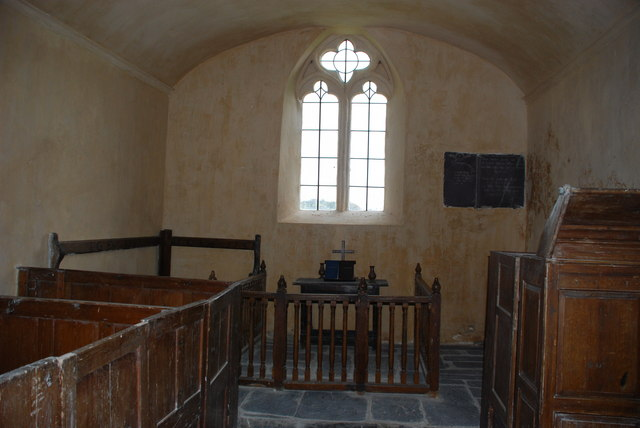
St Baglan's, interior

St Baglan's Church, Llanfaglan, is a redundant church in the parish of Llanfaglan, Gwynedd, Wales. It is designated by Cadw as a Grade I listed building, and is under the care of the Friends of Friendless Churches. It stands in an isolated position in a field some 150 metres (164 yd) from a minor road.

== History ==
The size of the surrounding churchyard and the presence within the structure of the church of a stone dating from the 5th or 6th century is evidence that an earlier church or churches stood on the site. It is traditionally credited to its namesake, the 7th-century saint Baglan ap Dingad. The present church dates probably from the 13th century. The chancel was rebuilt in about 1800, when the north porch was also added. Unusually, the church escaped restoration during the Victorian era, and so its interior is still little changed since about 1800. Describing the reasons for its Grade I listing, Cadw states it is "a rare example of a medieval church unrestored in the 19th century, so retaining an exceptionally complete set of 18th-century furnishings". It also comments on its "outstanding isolated setting." After it was declared redundant, the church was vested in the charity the Friends of Friendless Churches in 1991, and the charity has held the freehold since 7 February 1991. It has since been repaired, aided by financial help from Cadw.

== Architecture ==
=== Exterior ===
The church is constructed in stone with slate roofs. Its plan consists of a nave and a chancel under a single roof, a south transept acting as a chapel, and a north porch. On the west gable is a bellcote, and on the chancel gable is a weathered cross. There are no windows in the nave, and the chancel has only a two-light east window. In the south and east walls of the transept are small two-light windows. Over the doorway is a lintel consisting of a 6th-century inscribed stone. Internally, the walls are plastered and whitewashed; the roof timbers are also whitewashed. The floor is paved with slate slabs. There is no division between the nave and the chancel, and the transept is fully open to the body of the church. The east window dates from the 14th century and was resited when the chancel was rebuilt.

=== Interior ===
Cadw describes the set of mid- and later 18th-century furniture as being "exceptional". The oak altar is enclosed by communion rails on three sides; the rails are supported by slender balusters and on the corner posts are finials. In the southwest corner of the chancel is an oak pulpit and a reading desk over which is a sounding board. The seating in the nave, chancel and transept consists of box pews and benches, some of which are inscribed with initials and dates. The font dates from the 13th or 14th century and consists of a heptagonal gritstone bowl on a heptagonal shaft. On the walls of the church are slate memorial tablets. The bell is dated 1790, and was re-fitted in 2003. An early 19th-century brass candelabrum, a chalice dated 1723, and a silver salver of 1752 which were formerly in the church are now in the care of Bangor Cathedral.

== External features ==
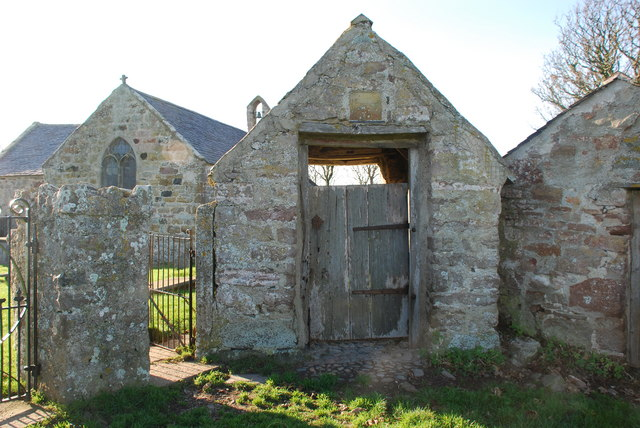
St Baglan's church, lychgate

Adjacent to the church is a field in which Baglan's well was sited. This was a structure containing seats, and it was said to have healing powers. It was filled in during the 19th century. The church is now approached through a lychgate dated 1722.

== Notable interments ==
On 20 January 2017, the church was the venue for the funeral of Antony Armstrong-Jones, 1st Earl of Snowdon. He was buried in the churchyard where the family has a plot.
