= St Eugrad's Church, Llaneugrad =

Coordinates: 53.332948°N 4.260584°W

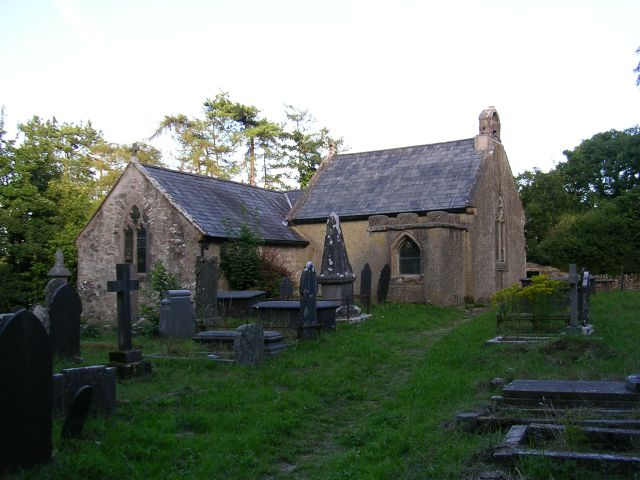
- A view from the north-west; the north chapel is on the left, the nave (with the vestry attached) to the right

- Location in Anglesey
- Location: near Marian-glas, Anglesey
- Country: Wales
- Denomination: Church in Wales
- Website: Llanallgo and Llaneugrad parish website

History
- Status: Church
- Founded: c. 605
- Founder: Eugrad
- Dedication: Eugrad

Architecture
- Functional status: Active
- Heritage designation: Grade II*
- Designated: 12 May 1970
- Style: Decorated

Specifications
- Length: Nave: 18 ft 9 in (5.7 m)
- Materials: Rubble masonry

Administration
- Province: Province of Wales
- Diocese: Diocese of Bangor
- Archdeaconry: Bangor
- Deanery: Twrcelyn
- Parish: Llaneugrad and Llanallgo with Penrhosllugwy with Llanfihangel Tre'r Beirdd

Clergy
- Vicar: Vacant

St Eugrad's Church, Llaneugrad is an isolated church near the village of Marian-glas, in Anglesey, north Wales. A church was supposedly founded here by St Eugrad in about 605, although the earliest parts of the present structure are the nave, chancel and chancel arch, which date from the 12th century. A side chapel was added to the north in the 16th century, and some moderate restoration work was carried out in the 19th century. It contains a 12th-century font, a 13th-century carved stone depicting the crucifixion, and a memorial to one of the officers killed when the Royal Charter sank off Anglesey in 1859.

The church is still used for worship by the Church in Wales, one of four in a combined parish; one of the others is St Gallgo's Church, Llanallgo, founded by Eugrad's brother. As of 2012, the parish does not have an incumbent priest. St Eugrad's is a Grade II* listed building, a national designation given to "particularly important buildings of more than special interest", in particular because it is regarded as a "simple rural church" and "characteristic of the island", and because of the medieval fabric including the chancel arch, described as "a rare survivor of an early building date for the region."

== History and location ==
St Eugrad's Church is in the countryside in the north-east of Anglesey, north Wales, in the community of Llaneugrad. It is about half a mile (800 m) from the village of Marian-glas and 5 miles (8.0 km) from the county town of Llangefni. The isolated church, set within an oval churchyard, is located at the side of a lane leading to a house and farm. The community of Llaneugrad (a local government sub-division equivalent to a parish council in England) takes its name from the church: the Welsh word llan originally meant "enclosure" and then "church".

The 19th-century writer Samuel Lewis said that the church was supposedly founded in about 605 by St Eugrad. Eugrad was one of the sons of St Caw (a king from northern Britain) and a brother of St Gildas. He was also brother of St Gallgo, who founded the nearby church now dedicated to him. St Gallgo's and St Eugrad's have been in the same parish since at least 1253.

No part of any building from the early 7th century survives. The oldest parts of the church are the walls of the nave and the chancel, which are from the 12th century. The north and south doorways were added in the 14th and 15th centuries respectively. A chapel was added to the north side of the chancel in the 16th century. This was at a time when a second altar was added to many churches to allow expressions of devotion to St Mary, and side chapels from the late 15th and early 16th centuries can be found in many Anglesey churches. The 17th century saw the re-roofing of the nave. A porch was added to the south-west corner and a vestry to the north-west in the middle of the 19th century; Some restoration work (described as "conservative") took place in the later part of the century.

St Eugrad's is still used for worship by the Church in Wales. It is one of four churches in the combined benefice of Llaneugrad and Llanallgo with Penrhosllugwy with Llanfihangel Tre'r Beirdd. It is within the deanery of Twrcelyn, the archdeaconry of Bangor and the Diocese of Bangor. As of 2012, there is a vacancy for an incumbent priest. A service of Holy Communion or Morning Prayer (in English) is held at the church most Sunday mornings.

The poet Dafydd Trefor is recorded in a list of clergy for the Bangor diocese of 1504 as being rector of St Gallgo's and St Eugrad's, and signed himself as such in a deed of 1524. The poet and historian John Williams (better known by his bardic name "Glanmor") was rector of the two churches from 1883 until his death in 1891.

== Architecture and fittings ==
St Eugrad's is built in Decorated style using rubble masonry with gritstone dressings. The roof is made of slate and has stone coping. It has a 17th-century bellcote at the west end containing one bell, and stone crosses at the tops of the gables. All of the church's external walls have been pebbledashed apart from the north and west wall of the chapel and the south porch. The vestry and the porch both have flat roofs and battlements.

The church is entered through the porch at the south-west corner of the nave, which leads to a round-arched 15th-century doorway. Internally, the nave and chancel are separated by a 12th-century arch, which is now covered in plaster. The nave is 18 feet 9 inches by 12 feet 6 inches (5.7 by 3.8 m). A doorway on the north side of the nave, from the 14th century, leads into the 19th-century vestry. Alongside the doorway there is a water stoup which shows signs of weathering, and a carved stone depicting the crucifixion. It shows a "crudely carved" figure on a wheel cross, and is probably from the 13th century. It was previously set in a recess above the south door. The plain baptismal font, thought to be from the 12th century, is at the west end of the nave.

The chancel measures 12 feet 9 inches by 10 feet 6 inches (3.9 by 3.2 m). Its roof is from the 16th century and has its trusses closer together than the 17th-century nave roof. The south wall of the chancel has a decorated wooden panel dated 1644, which used to be part of a pulpit. The north wall was removed when the chapel was added, and a beam placed across the opening. The chapel measures 20 feet by 12 feet 9 inches (6.1 by 3.9 m). Its roof is also from the 16th century and is similar to the nave roof. There is a blocked 16th-century doorway with a pointed arch on the chapel's west side.

The windows mainly date from the 19th century. The south wall of the nave has a blocked-up round-headed window from the 12th century. The 19th-century east window has three lights (sections of window separated vertically by mullions) topped by tracery in trefoil shapes (decorative stonework in a three-leaf circular pattern). The chapel's north and west window are similar. The north window in the vestry has details similar to those of the blocked nave window, and reuses some medieval material in the window sill. There is no stained glass in the church; all the windows have clear glass.

The church furniture (pews, pulpit, reading desk and chancel rail) is from the 19th century; all the items are all decorated with trefoil holes. A survey of church plate within the Bangor diocese in 1906 recorded some plain silver-plated items (chalice, paten, flagon and alms dish) without inscriptions or dates.

There are various 18th-century memorials, and some from the 19th and 20th centuries honouring members of the Williams family upon whose land the church stands. John Groome, the Fourth Officer of the Royal Charter (which sank off the east coast of Anglesey in 1859 with the loss of over 440 lives) is remembered with a stone memorial in Art Nouveau style.

== Assessment ==
The church has national recognition and statutory protection from alteration as it has been designated as a Grade II* listed building – the second-highest of the three grades of listing, designating "particularly important buildings of more than special interest". It was given this status on 12 May 1970, and has been listed as "a simple rural church (characteristic of the island)" which is "substantially 12th-century in character and fabric". Cadw (the Welsh Government body responsible for the built heritage of Wales and the inclusion of Welsh buildings on the statutory lists) also notes the chancel arch, commenting that it "represents a rare survivor of an early building date for the region", the 13th-century cruxifixion stone and the 16th-century chancel roof and chapel.

The 19th-century Anglesey historian Angharad Llwyd described the church in 1833 as "a small but stately edifice, of lofty proportions and venerable appearance." The clergyman and antiquarian Harry Longueville Jones visited in 1844, and later wrote that "this little edifice is one of the simplest in the island", although he added that "the plan of the building has been rendered very anomalous" because of the erection of the chapel, "as large as the nave", on the north side of the chancel. He noted the "rudely sculptured crucifixal figure", suggesting that it may have come from the churchyard cross. At the time of his visit, he said that the church "was in a state of great neglect" but deserved to be "carefully preserved" because of its "architectural peculiarities".

A 2006 guide to the churches of Anglesey comments that the nave and chancel both have "considerable headroom", and notes the "very large beam" between the chancel and chapel. It describes the porch as "unusual" because of its flat roof and castellation. A 2009 guide to the buildings of the region describes St Eugrad's as "very small", adding that it is "small enough to have preserved its plan from the Early Christian Church". It comments that the north and south doorways are "obscured" by the "clumsily battlemented" porch and vestry.
