= St Winifred's Church, Branscombe =

Church in Branscombe, Devon, England

Coordinates: 50.691°N 3.140°W

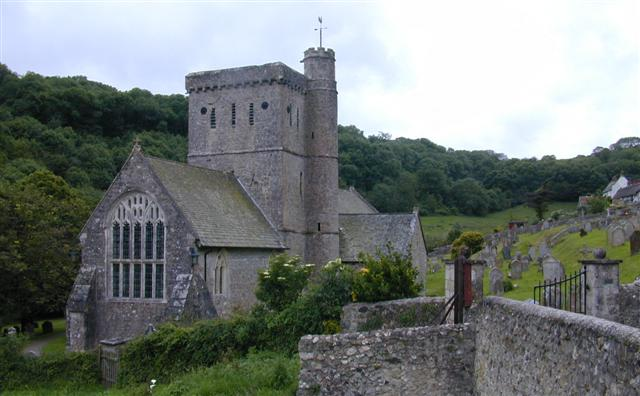
Branscombe Church

St Winifred's Church is a Church of England church in Branscombe in Devon, England. The church is dedicated to Saint Winifred, a Welsh saint. It is among the oldest and most architecturally significant parish churches of Devon. It probably dates back as far as about 995, but extant records on the vicars only go back to the thirteenth century.

== History ==
There is some archaeological evidence to suggest that an earlier Saxon church may have occupied the site. Characteristic Saxon chiselling on stones hidden in the turret staircase suggest the probability of an earlier, 10th century, church on the site. The building has a traditional west―east alignment. It is built on a levelled area that can not be seen from the coast. The choice of location may have been for protection of the original Saxon church from Viking raiders. Alternatively, the church may have been placed on an earlier pre-Christian holy site. Occupying such a pagan site would have allowed the Church to both challenge paganism and benefit from any positive religious feelings associated with the site.

Records suggest that the church held St Brannoc's arm as a relic, though it was taken to Milton Abbey in Dorset in 933 on the orders of King Athelstan. St. Winifred's was owned by the monks of Exeter Cathedral.

== Interior ==
The church building is partly Norman and partly later medieval. The tower is central and the transepts, which are later, stand unusually to the west of the tower. The nave is Norman, the transepts perhaps mid–13th-century. The chancel is probably 14th-century, though the east window was replaced in the time of Bishop Neville (1458–1464). Interesting features include the font, which is 15th-century, and the pulpit, which is a three-decker pulpit and as such almost unique in Devon. Other woodwork includes the Jacobean screen and west gallery and the altar rails of c. 1700.

=== Memorial to Joan Tregarthin ===
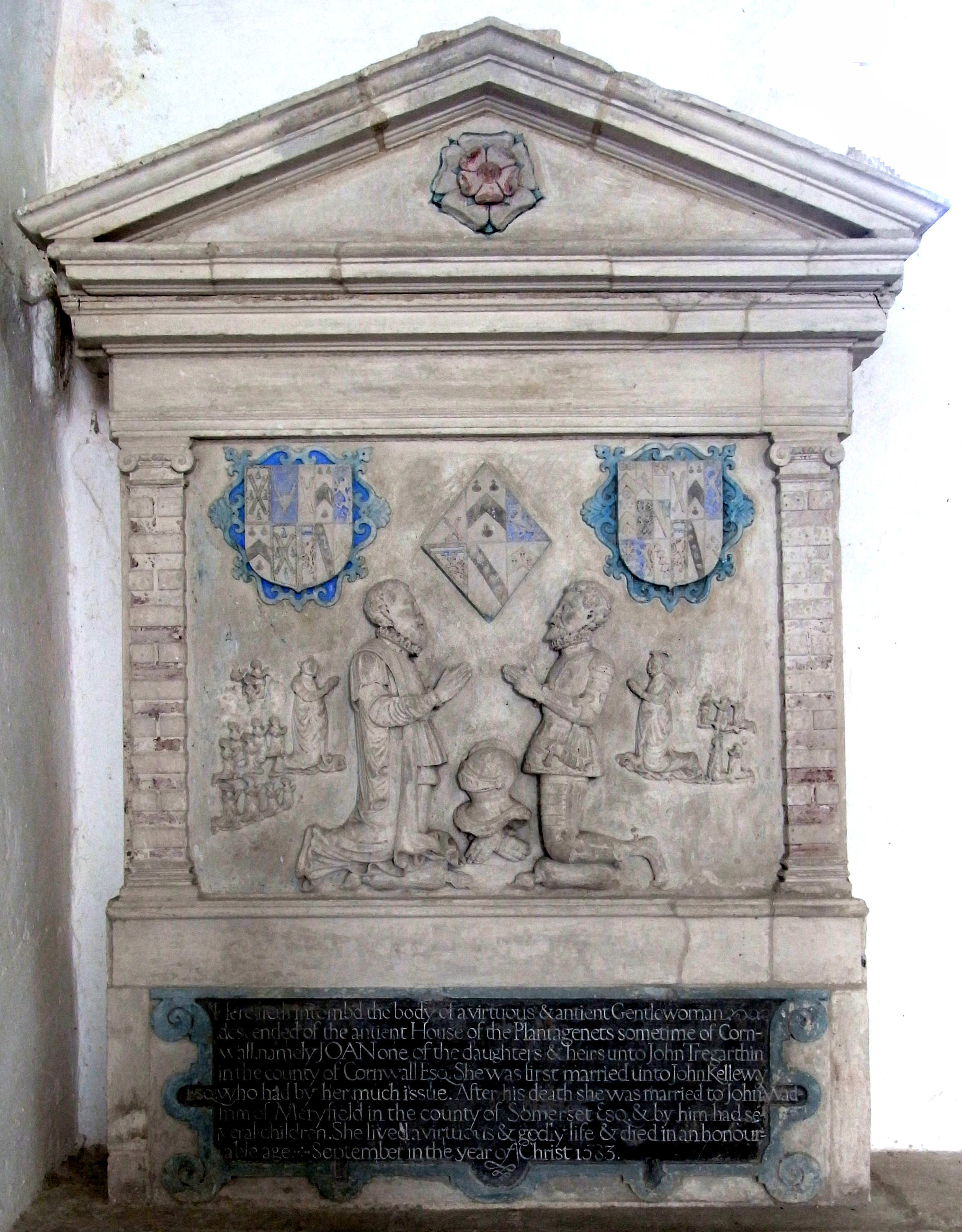
Mural monument to Joan Tregarthin

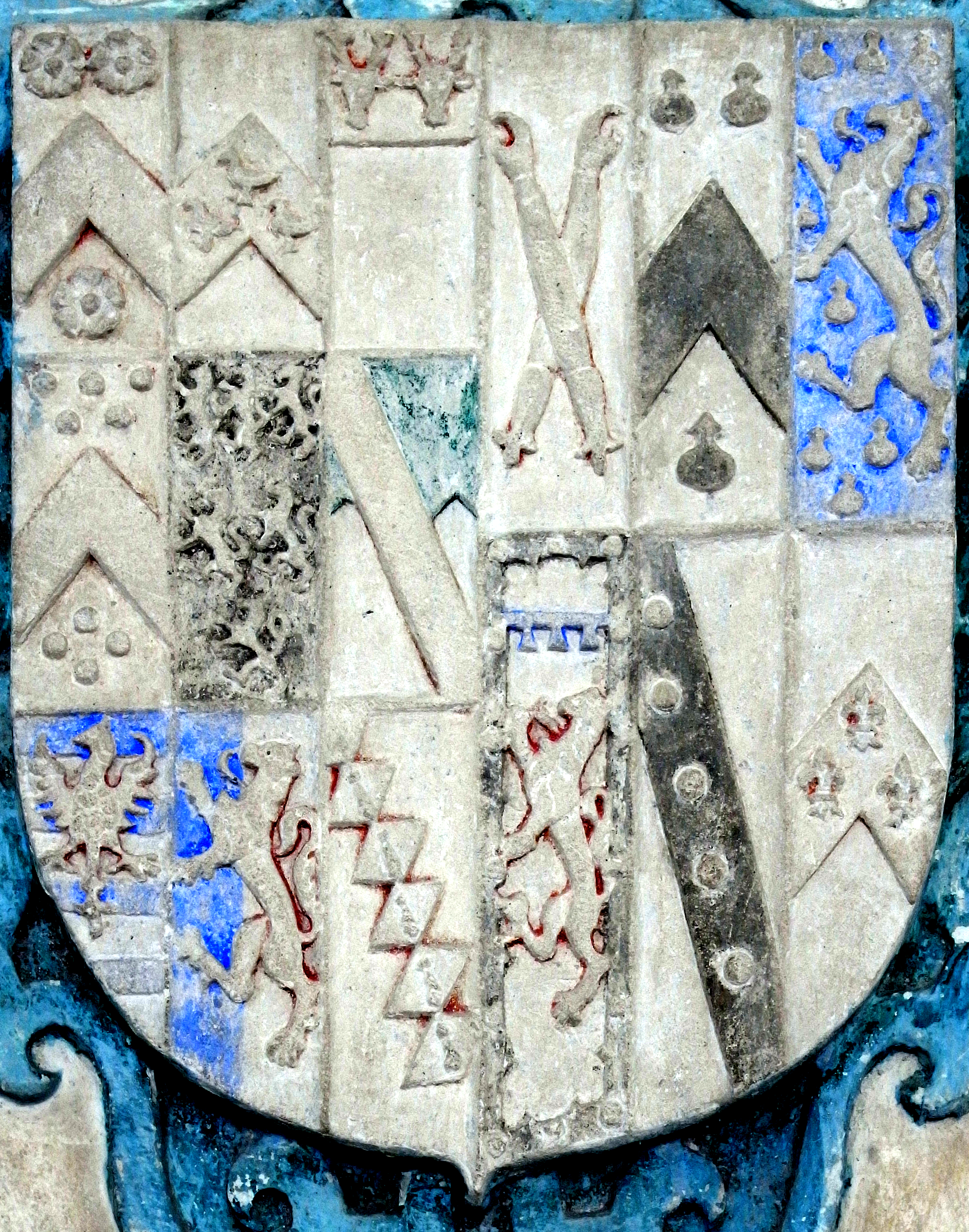
Heraldic escutcheon from memorial showing the arms of Wadham, of nine quarters, impaling Tregarthin, of six quarters

A mural was erected in the north transept in memory of Joan Tregarthin some time after her death in 1583. She was the daughter and co-heiress of John Tregarthin of Cornwall, and widow of a John Kelleway of Collumpton, by whom she had fourteen children; and then of John Wadham of Merryfield and Edge, son of Sir Nicholas I Wadham, with whom she had six children, including Nicholas II Wadham, co-founder of Wadham College, Oxford. After her husband's death in 1578, she moved into her dower house at Edge.

The memorial has suffered much neglect, and been whitewashed several times. Little colouring remains, which makes identification of the armorials difficult. The relief sculpture is well executed and clear. The small kneeling effigy of Joan appears twice on the monument, kneeling behind each husband. According to the local historian Ronald Branscombe, this is "a double appearance thought to be unique in British memorial art of this period".

A large slate tablet below the figures is inscribed:

Here lieth intomb'd the body of a virtuous & antient gentlewoman descended of the antient house of Plantagenets sometime of Cornwall namely JOAN, one of the daughters & heirs unto John Tregarthin in the County of Cornwall, Esq. She was first married unto John Kelleway, Esq., who had by her much issue. After his death she was married to John Wadham of Meryfield in the County of Somerset, Esq., & by him had several children. She lived a virtuous and godly life & died in an honourable age, ...(date never inscribed)... September in the year of Christ 1583
