= Ufelwy =

6th-century saint of Wales

Ufelwy is a 6th-century saint of Wales and grandson of Gildas. He was a priest, bishop, saint and confessor. He was granted land from church officials upon which he built a church.
