= Edeyrn =

Welsh saint

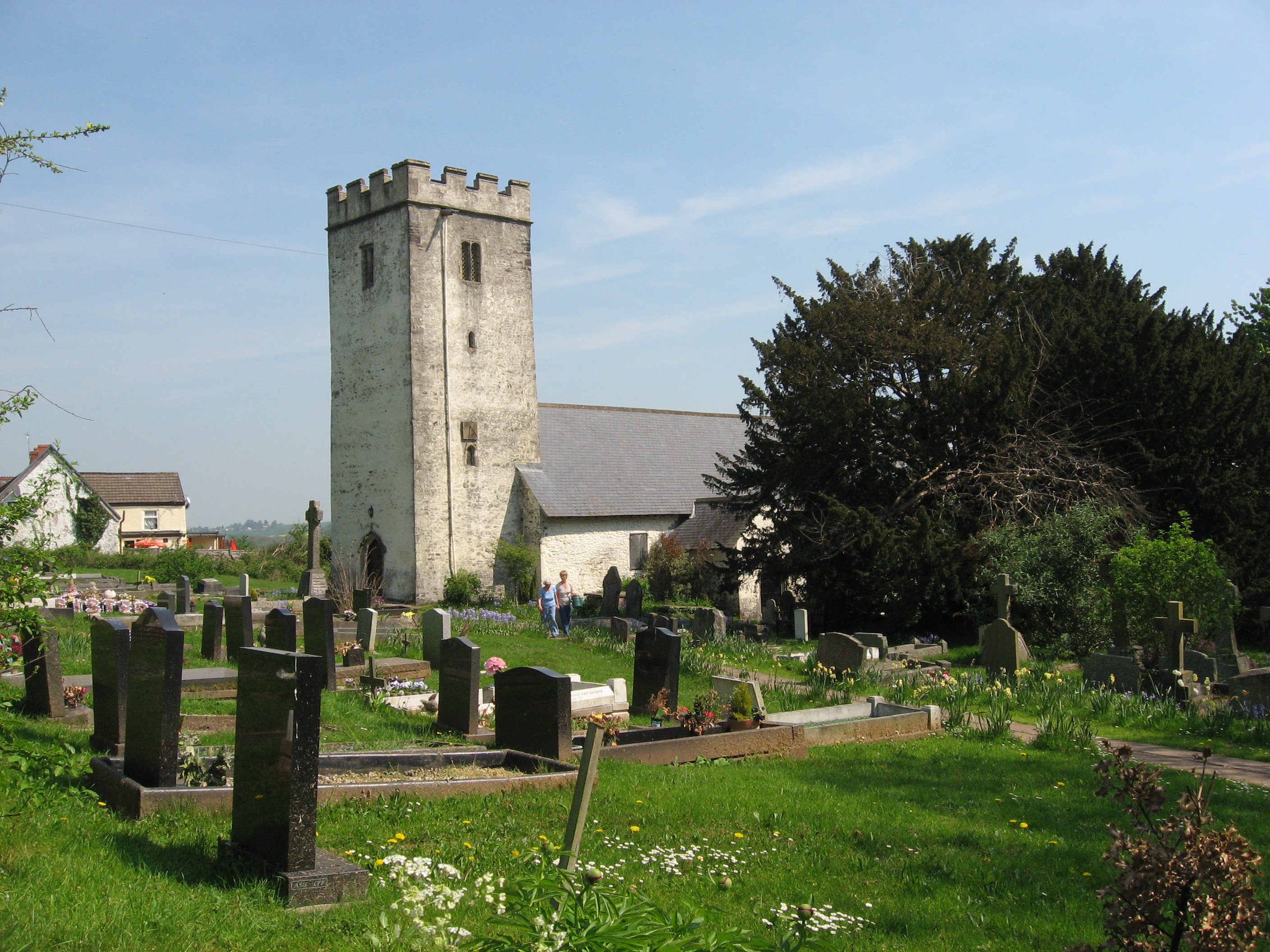
St Edeyrn's church, Llanedeyrn

Saint Edeyrn (c. 6th century) was a pre-congregational saint of Wales, related to Vortigern and the royal house of Powys and the brother of Saint Aerdeyrn and Elldeyrn. Edeyrn is the patron saint of Lannédern in France and Llanedeyrn in Wales, where he founded a monastery of over 300 people.

== Legend ==
Legend holds he was a companion of King Arthur, before moving to France where he became a Hermit. Being from the family of Vortigen, however, would make a relationship with King Arthur unlikely.

== Legacy ==
He is remembered in churches across Wales and Brittany including Monmouth and Llanedeyrn near Cardiff in Wales and Lannédern in Brittany France. He is often depicted riding a deer and his feast day is 6 January.

== Gallery ==
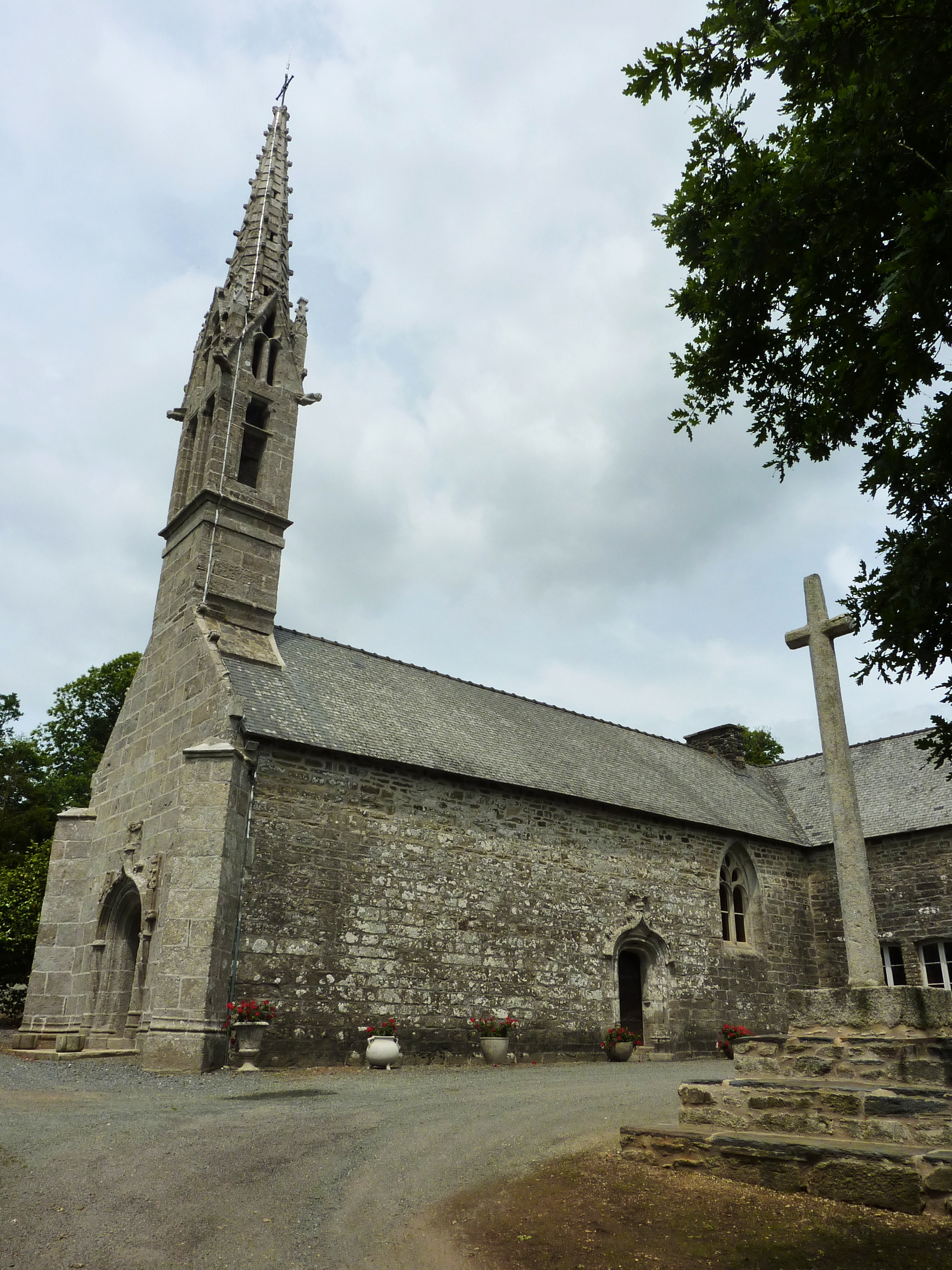
The chapelle de Coat ar Roc'h, Lannedern

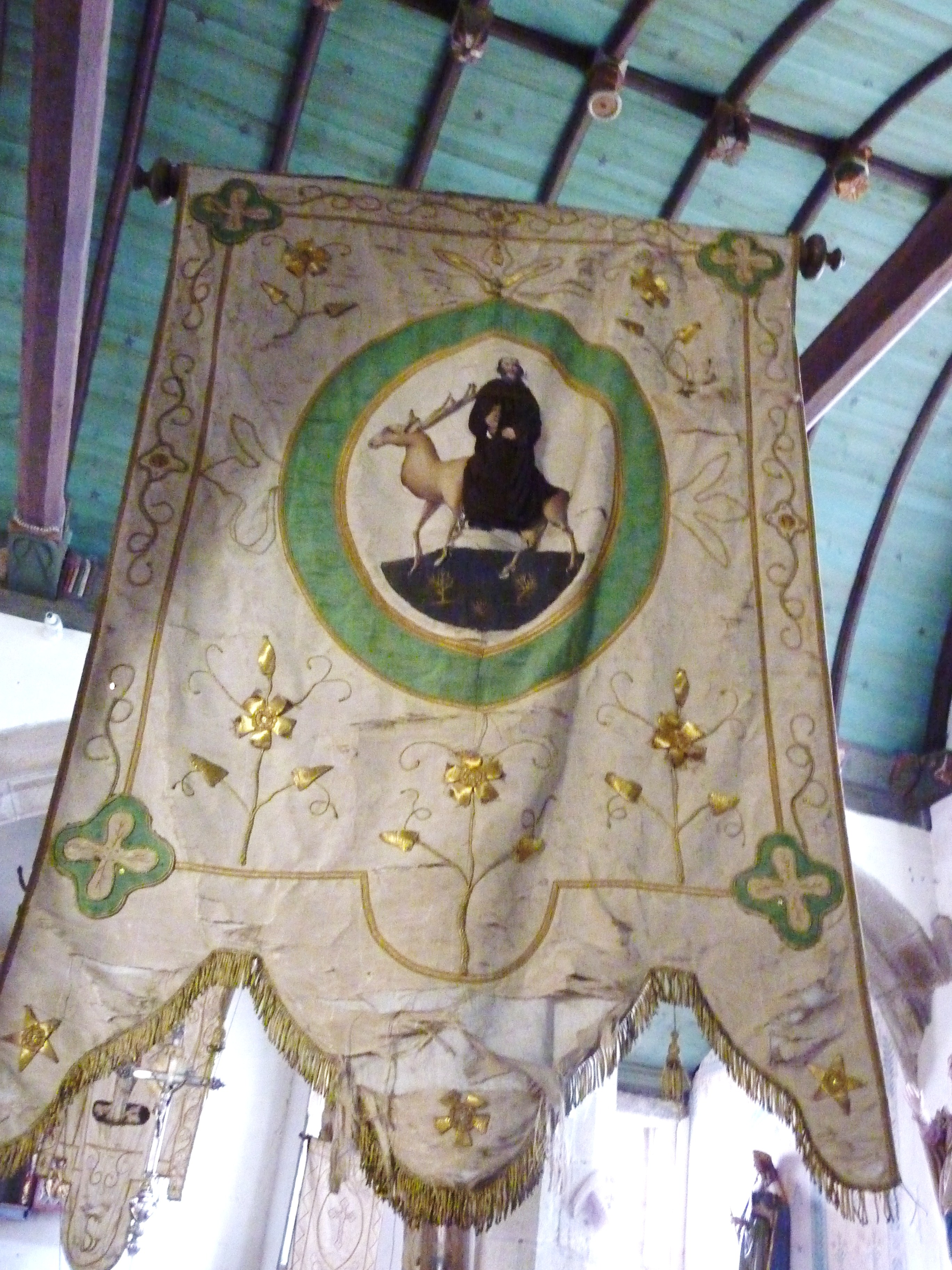
The banner of Saint Edeyrn at Loqueffret France

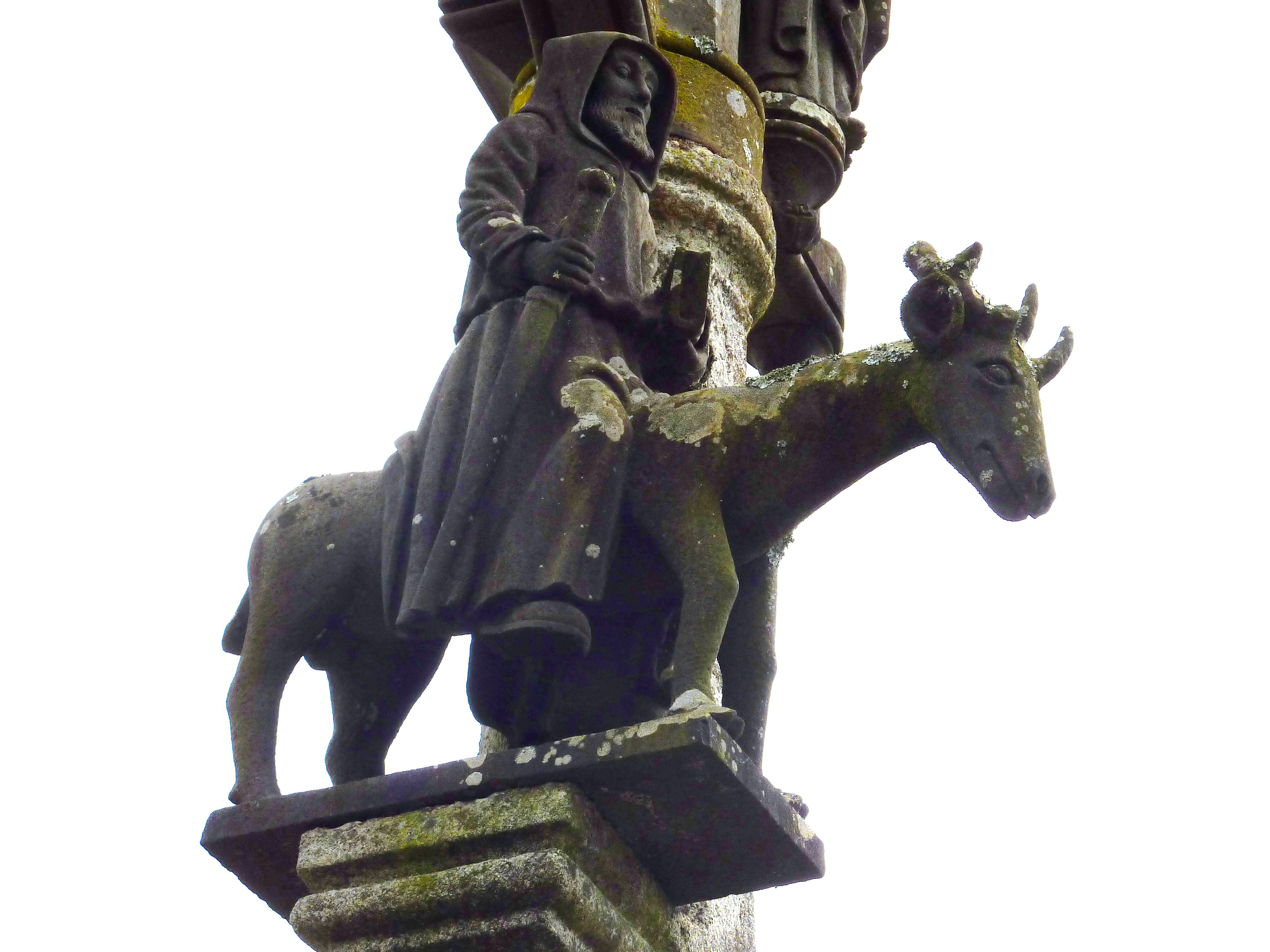
Saint Edern on his stag Lannédern Brittany (France)

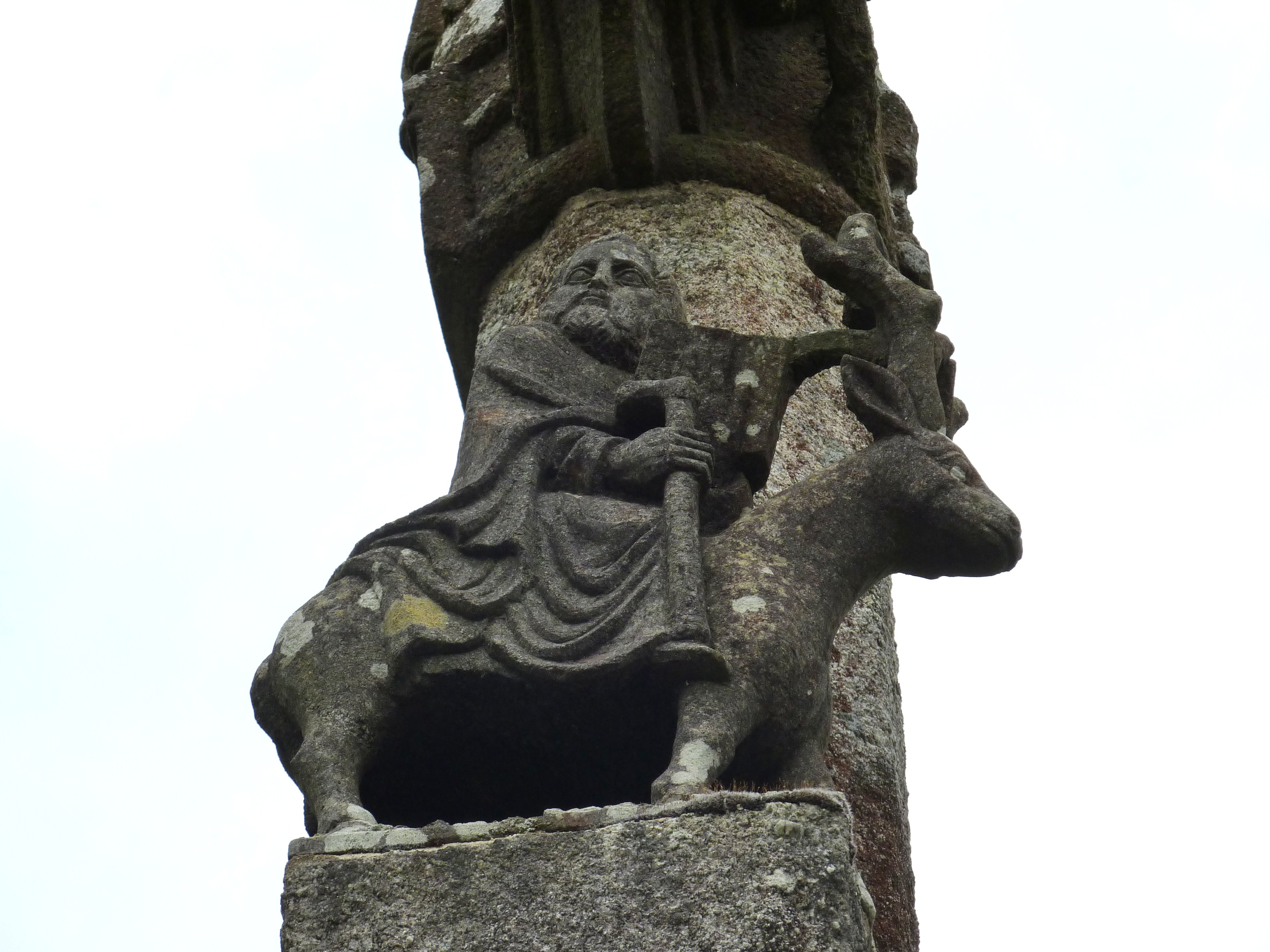
Statue of Edeurn at Loqueffret
