= Brannoc of Braunton =

6th-century Christian saint

Saint Brannoc
- Born: 6th century supposedly Wales
- Died: Braunton in North Devon
- Venerated in: Anglican Communion; Orthodox Church; Roman Catholicism
- Major shrine: Braunton in North Devon (destroyed)
- Feast: 26 June or 7 January.

Brannoc of Braunton or Saint Brannock was a Christian saint associated with the village of Braunton in the English county of Devon. His feast is 7 January.

== Life ==
The history of St Brannoc is confused – some sources conflate him with Saint Brynach, however Exeter Cathedral celebrates the feast of Brynach on 7 April and that of Brannoc on 7 January so it is unlikely that they are the same saint. In contrast, Braunton celebrates St Brannock's Day on the 26 June.

Brannock migrated from South Wales to establish a monastery at Braunton in the 6th century. Braunton church was dedicated to him from at least 854 and in the Middle Ages it was believed that he was buried in the church with both William of Worcester and Leland stating that he was buried there. Tradition states that he first built his church on a hill overlooking Braunton, but it collapsed. In a dream he was told to look for a sow and seven piglets for the site to build his new church. This story is commemorated in one of the stained glass windows and in a roof boss of St Brannock's Church, Braunton.

Records suggest that St Winifred's Church, Branscombe held St Brannoc's arm as a relic, though it was taken to Milton Abbey in Dorset in 933 on the orders of King Athelstan.
