= Gwenafwy =

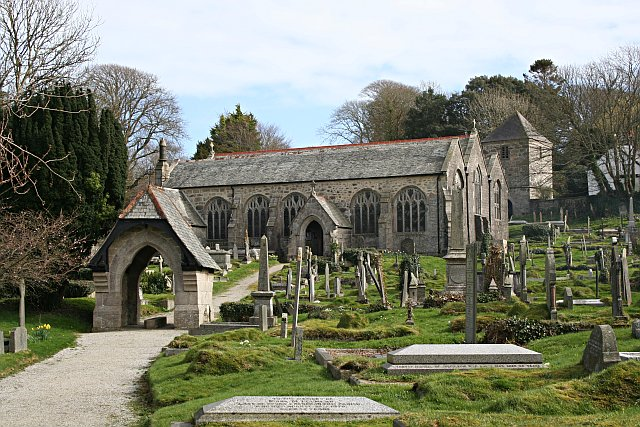
St. Wenappa's Church, Gwennap

Saint Gwenafwy (Wenappa) (fl. 6th century) was a pre-congregational saint of medieval South Wales. She was a daughter of Caw of Strathclyde, and sister of Peillan, Eigron and Peithein among others. She went to Cornwall with her brother Eigron where she is the patroness of Gwennap.

Her feast day is 1 July.
