= Aerdeyrn =

Medieval Welsh saint

Saint Aerdeyrn
- Born: c. 6th century
- Residence: Wales
- Venerated in: Roman Catholic Church
- Patronage: Llanelldeyrn, Wales

Saint Aerdeyrn (c. 6th century) was a semi-legendary pre-congregational saint of Wales. He was a descendant of Vortigern, making him related to the royal house of Powys. He was the brother of Saint Edeyrn and Elldeyrn with whom he is oft associated. His name was derived from the Celtic word for Prince. He built churches in Glamorgan and he is the patron Saint of Llanelldeyrn, Wales.
