= Eigron =

Saint Eigron was a pre-congregational saint of medieval South Wales.

He was the brother of Saint Gwenafwy whom he travelled to Cornwall with, a brother to Gildas and a son of Caw of Strathclyde. He was the Patron Saint of Llanigon, Wales and founded a Church in Cernyw.
