= Mydan =

Pre-congregational saint of medieval Wales

Saint Mydan was a legendary pre-congregational saint of medieval Wales known from only one seventeenth century manuscript. He was reputedly the son of Pasgen ab Urien Rheged, and brother of Saint Gwrfyw.

He was a Saint of Cor Catwg, at Llancarfan. He had a brother, Saint Gwrfyw, who was the father of S. Nidan. It is quite possible that Mydan is a misreading for Nidan.
