= Gwrfyw =

Pre-congregational saint of medieval Wales

Saint Gwrfyw, was a pre-congregational saint of medieval Wales.

== Family ==
He was the son of Pasgen ab Urien Rheged, of the family of Coel Godhebog, and father of Saint Nidan.

A single manuscript holds that he had brothers Mydan and Llamined who the Venedotian Tribes of Collwyn ab Tangno and Marchweithian traced their descent through him.

== Career ==
He is said to have a church dedicated to him in Anglesey, but its situation does not appear to be now known. There was formerly a Capel Gorfyw at Bangor, but it has long since disappeared. The only written evidence of him is as a witness to a land grant in Monmouthshire.
