= Bidofydd =

6th-century Welsh saint

Bidofydd was a 6th-century saint of Wales, often associated with saint Fidalis.

His feast day is 26 April.
