= St Brannock's Church, Braunton =

St Brannock's Church
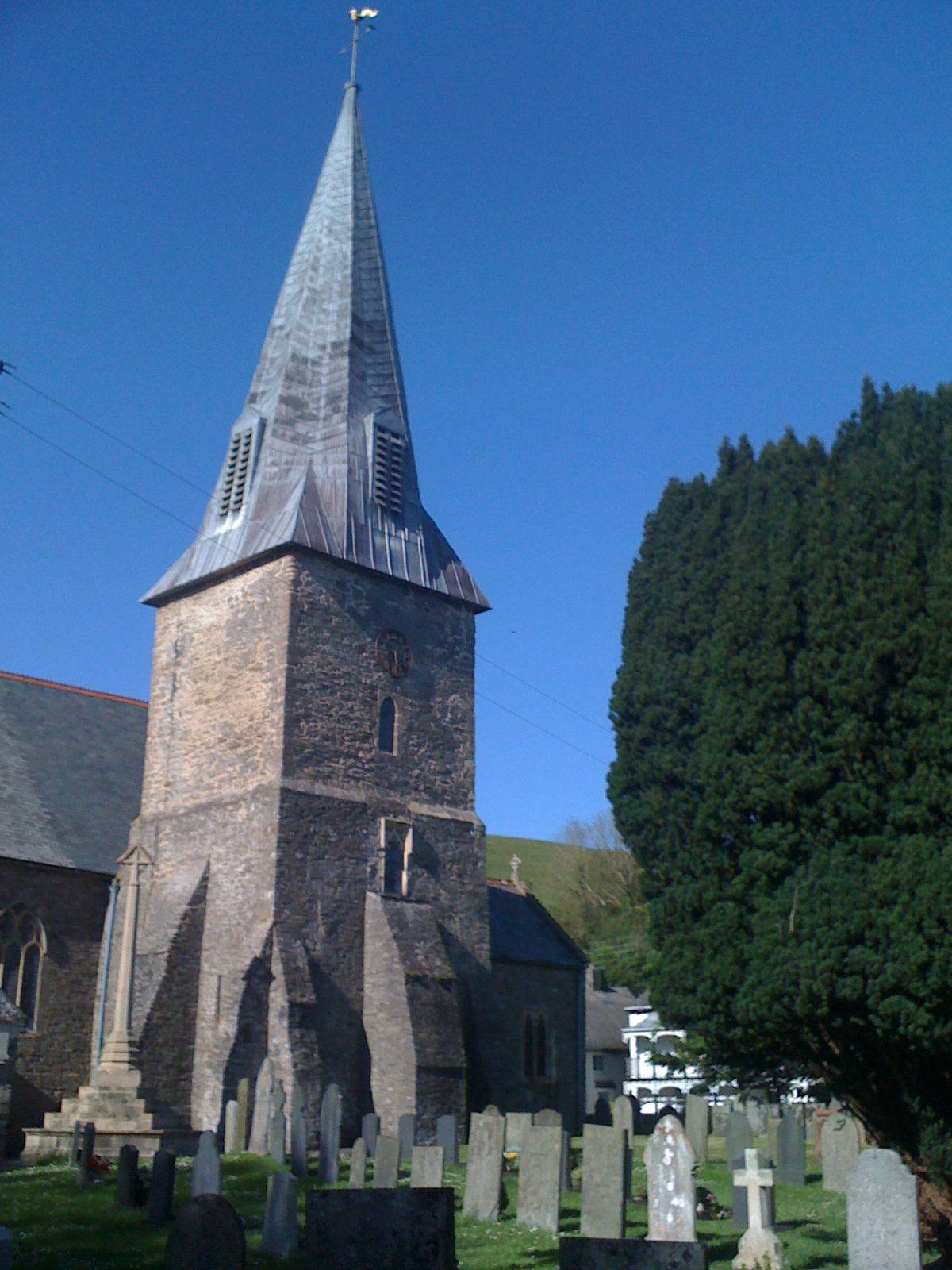
- St Brannock's Church, Braunton
- St Brannock's Church
- 51.1130°N 4.1597°W
- OS grid reference: SS 48916 37072
- Location: Braunton
- Country: England
- Denomination: Church of England
- Churchmanship: Liberal Anglo-Catholic
- Website: http://www.brauntonchurch.org

History
- Founded: c.550 AD (origins)
- Founder: St Brannock

Architecture
- Style: Early English
- Years built: Thirteenth Century

Administration
- Diocese: Diocese of Exeter

Clergy
- Vicar: The Revd David Baker

St Brannock's Church is a medieval Church of England church in Braunton, Devon, England. According to legend it was founded by Saint Brannock, a 6th-century Christian saint. It became a Grade I listed building on 25 February 1965.

== History ==
The present church dates from the thirteenth century and stands on the foundations of its Saxon predecessor, though Christian worship on the site may date back to as early as the 6th century. St Brannock was an early Christian saint who is believed to have migrated from South Wales to establish a monastery at Braunton in the 6th century. Sir John Betjeman states that St Brannoc was "almost certainly" buried beneath the high altar.

Local tradition suggests that St Brannock originally built his church on a hill overlooking Braunton, but that the church collapsed. Following this setback, in a dream, the Saint was told to look for "a sow and piglets", and that this would be the site to build his new church. This story is commemorated in one of the stained glass windows and also in a roof boss of the church, which features a sow feeding her litter.

The church was seriously damaged as a result of an arson attack in July 2003. The fire completely destroyed the gallery housing the organ pipes, which dated to the 16th century, as well as damaging pews and an antique Bible. As a result of this, services were temporarily moved to nearby Brannock Rooms while restoration work went ahead. Following the attack, posters were placed around Braunton, threatening the perpetrators with revenge. At a trial in December, three pre-teen boys were found guilty of starting the fire and given 12-month supervision orders.

== Architecture and fittings ==
Nikolaus Pevsner described the church as "one of the most interesting, and also one of the most puzzling in North Devon", mentioning its massive, apparently Norman, south tower; its lead-covered broach spire, similar to that at St Peter and St Paul at Barnstaple; and the nave which despite being 34 ft wide, has no aisles.

Betjeman describes the church as "not very prepossessing but well worth visiting", and as having "a remarkably wide nave covered by a fine roof enriched with fifteenth century bosses". It also boasts an early Norman font, a Jacobean pulpit, and fourteenth-century carved wooden pews, which are listed. A series of 16th-century chestnut pew ends are of carved woodwork; one has a likeness of St Brannoc with a cow, testament to a tale surrounding him that a neighbour stole his cow, slaughtered it, put it into a stewing pot, and upon shouting the cow's name, Brannoc brought his cow back to life, reassembling it on the spot.

The tower of St Brannock's Church is over 700 years old and the chancel which has an arch and three lancets is about the same age. The 15th-century south chapel has a brass palimpsest (a monumental brass that has been re-used), hinged so that both sides are visible. The church is reportedly haunted.

The earliest surviving feature is a Saxon burial stone. There is a chest that may have come to England with the Spanish Armada. The church's war memorial was dedicated on 2 November 1921 in memory of soldiers from the village who died during the First World War. Constructed of stone from Somerset, it was restored in 2009.

== Events ==
St Brannock's Church frequently holds musical events, including a performance by folk singer Julie Felix. It has also held exhibitions of local culture and history.

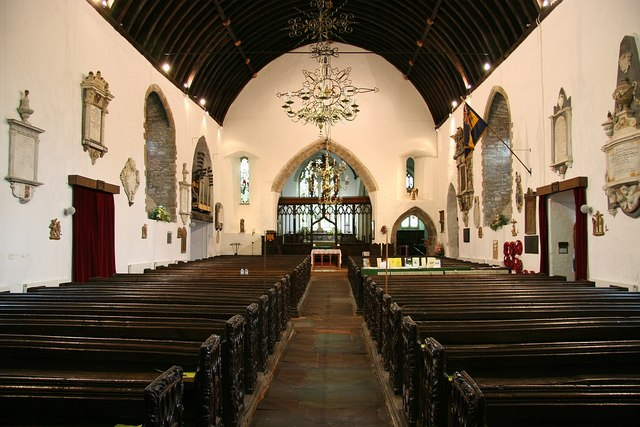
13th-century nave with 16th-century pews

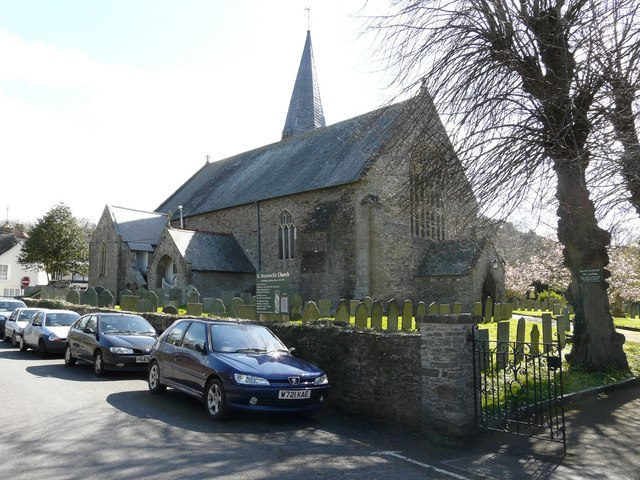
Exterior view from the northwest

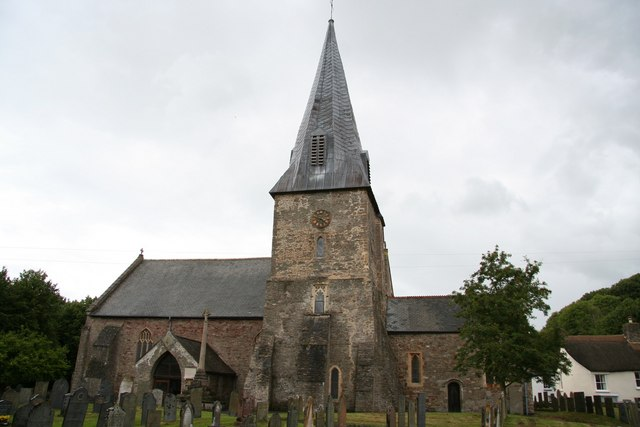
Exterior view from the south
