= Saint Eigrad =

Sixth-century Welsh saint

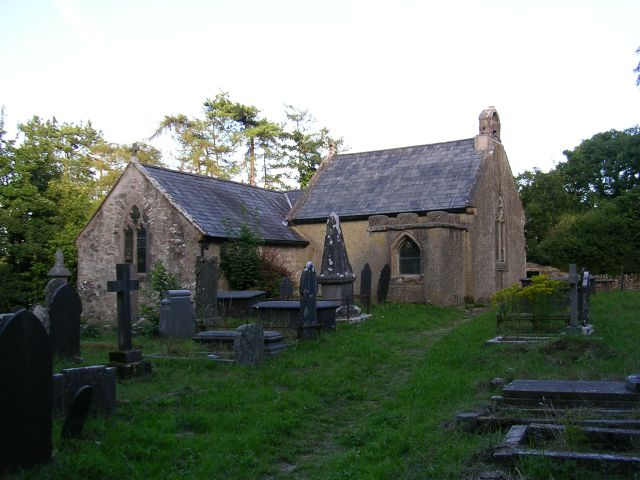
St Eugrad's Church, Llaneugrad

Saint Eigrad or Eugrad was a sixth-century Welsh saint and the founder of St Eugrad's Church in Llaneugrad, Anglesey.

== Life ==
Eigrad is mentioned in Caradoc's Life of Gildas (12th century). He was a son of king Caw of Strathclyde, a brother of saints Gildas, and Samson of York and was a student of Saint Illtud.

In 605 AD he founded a church at Llaneugrad, Anglesey and his brother Gallgo, founded a church at Llanallgo, nearby. Today the two churches are in the same parish.

== Memorial ==
His feast day is 6 January.
