= Consecrated virgin =

Consecrated, mystically betrothed to Christ and dedicated to the service of the Church

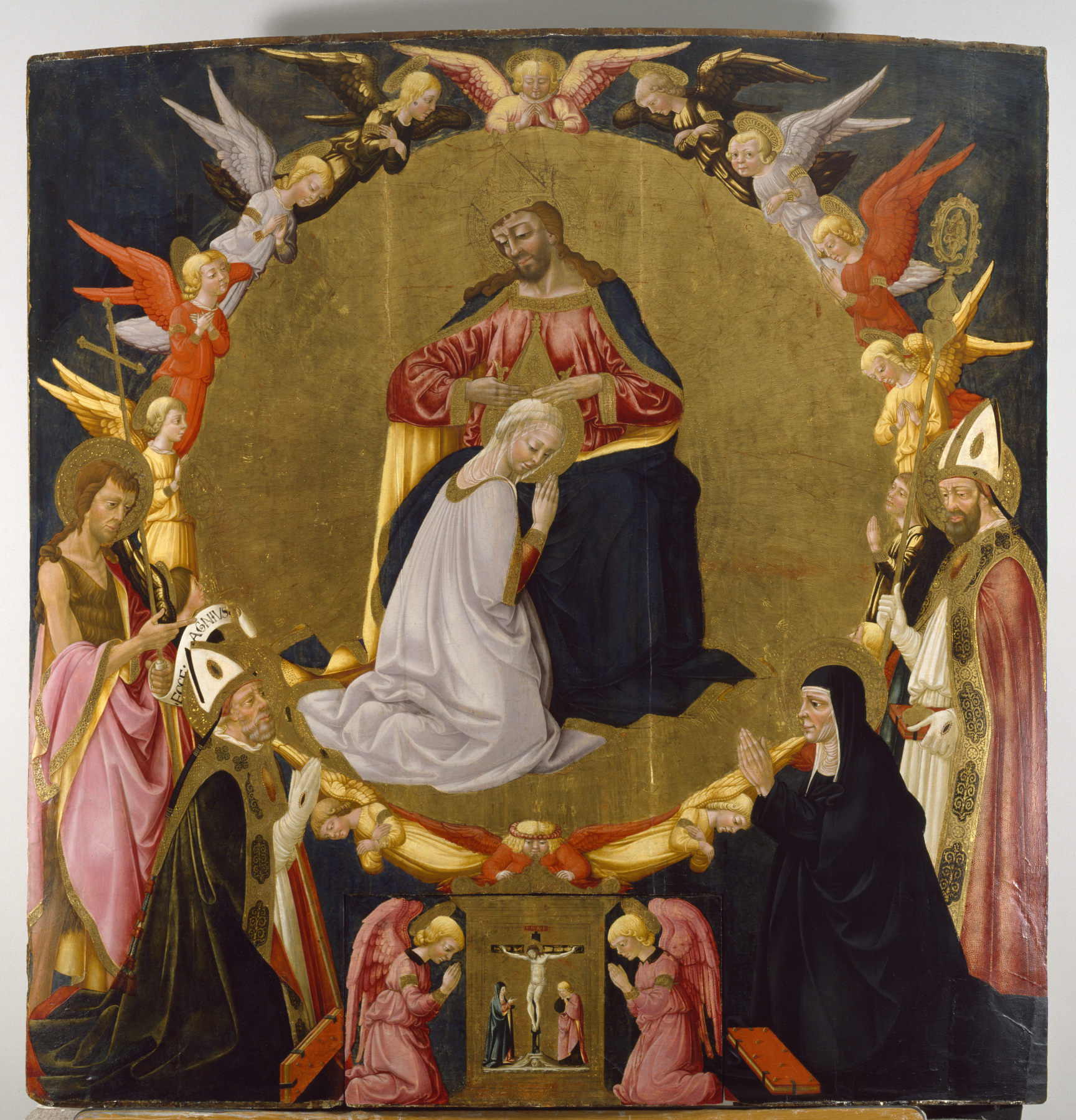
The Coronation of the Virgin by Neri di Bicci, c. 1470

In the Catholic Church, a consecrated virgin, Lat. virgo consecrata, is a woman who has been consecrated by the church to a life of perpetual virginity as a bride of Christ. Consecrated virgins are consecrated by the diocesan bishop according to the approved liturgical rite and to the service of the church.

Consecrated virgins spend their time in works of penance and mercy, in apostolic activity and in prayer, according to their state of life and spiritual gifts. A consecrated virgin may live either as a nun in a monastic order or in the world under the authority of her bishop.

The rite of consecration of virgins for women living in the world was reintroduced in 1970, under Pope Paul VI, in the wake of the Second Vatican Council. It is based on the template of the practice of the velatio virginum going back to the Apostolic era, especially the early virgin martyrs. The consecration of virgins for nuns who made their final profession of vows outlasted times in various forms and without discontinuation in bestowal.

The 1983 Code of Canon Law and the 1996 Apostolic Exhortation Vita Consecrata by Pope John Paul II speak of the reflourishing Order of Virgins (Ordo Virginum), the members of which represent an image of the church as the Bride of Christ. Estimates on the number of consecrated virgins derived from diocesan records range at around 5,000 consecrated virgins living in the world as of 2023.

In view of the upcoming 50th anniversary of the reintroduction, the Congregation for Institutes of Consecrated Life and Societies of Apostolic Life issued the instruction Ecclesia Sponsae imago in July 2018.

== History ==
=== Origins ===
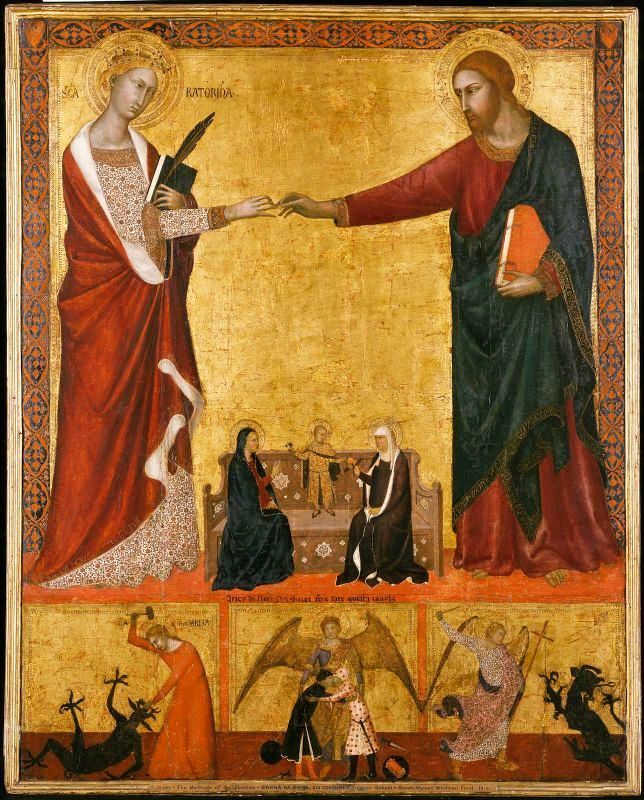
Mystic marriage of Saint Catherine (Barna da Siena, c. 1340)

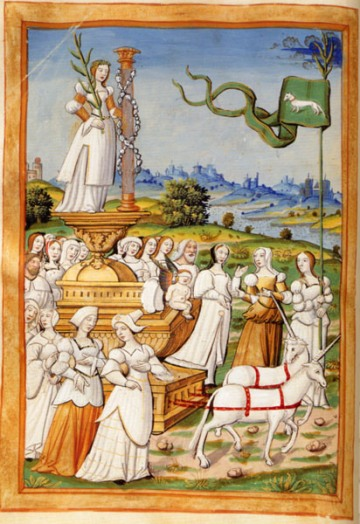
Triumph of Chastity: an allegory of the virtue of Chastity is standing on a wagon drawn by two unicorns; her train of virgins is led by one holding a banner bearing the emblem of the white weasel or ermine, symbol of chastity in medieval tradition (Master of the Paris Entries, c. 1500 – c. 1520).

Chastity is one of the Seven Virtues in Christian tradition, listed by Gregory the Great at the end of the 6th century. Praise of chastity or celibacy as a religious virtue is already present in the New Testament, especially in 1 Corinthians, in which Paul the Apostle suggests a special role for virgins or unmarried women (ἡ γυνὴ καὶ ἡ παρθένος ἡ ἄγαμος) as more suitable for "the things of the Lord" (μεριμνᾷ τὰ τοῦ κυρίου). In 2 Corinthians 11:2, Paul alludes to the metaphor of the Church as Bride of Christ by addressing the congregation: "I have espoused you to one husband, that I may present you as a chaste virgin to Christ".

In Christian hagiography, there are numerous accounts of pre-Nicaean virgin martyrs, such as Margaret of Antioch, Agnes of Rome, Euphemia of Chalcedon and Lucia of Syracuse.

In the theology of the Church Fathers, the prototype of the sacred virgin is the Blessed Virgin Mary, consecrated by the Holy Spirit at Annunciation. Although not stated in the gospels, the perpetual virginity of Mary was widely upheld as a dogma by the Church Fathers from the 4th century. The tradition of a ritual form of the consecration also dates to the 4th century, but it is widely held that a more informal consecration was imparted to consecrate women by their bishops dating from the time of the Apostles.

The first known formal rite of consecration is that of Saint Marcellina, dated AD 353, mentioned in De Virginibus by her brother, Saint Ambrose. Another early consecrated virgin is Saint Genevieve (c. 422 – c. 512). The earliest copies of the rite are from some of the earliest sacramentaries, like the 7th-century Leonine sacramentary.

During the medieval period, the rite of consecration was maintained by nuns in monastic orders, such as the Benedictines and Carthusians. This consecration could be done either concurrently with or some time after the profession of solemn vows. Among Carthusian nuns, there was the unique practice of these virgins being entitled to hand apart from a crown a stole, and a maniple, vestments otherwise reserved to clergy.

In the High Middle Ages, the Consecratio Virginum is known for Benedictine and Cistercian monasteries, it is mentioned in the Rule of Saint Clare of Assisi and its optional bestowing is also provided for in the constitutions of the first Dominican nuns.

=== Modern history ===
The modern revival of the rite of the consecration of virgins in the Catholic Church for women living outside of religious communities is associated with Anne Leflaive (1899–1987). The consecration of virgins after the fashion of the ancient Church was supported by certain French bishops in the early 20th century. Leflaive was directed towards this vocation by François de Rovérié de Cabrières, the bishop of Montpellier. She received the consecration in the chapel of Carmel at Paray-le-Monial on 6 January 1924, on her 25th birthday, by the bishop of Autun, Hyacinthe-Jean Chassagnon.

There was an increasing demand for such consecrations in the 1920s, and bishops requested clarification from the Congregation for Institutes of Consecrated Life. The reply given on 25 March 1927 was in the negative. The Congregation forbade the revival of this type of consecration. The 1927 decree argued that the consecration of virgins living in the world (in saeculo viventes) had long fallen out of use, and was in contradiction to the then current Canon Law of 1917. It was also argued that the official sanction of a vow of virginity in a "very imposing ceremony" might risk to lead the women so consecrated to judge their status as superior to those of nuns, whose solemn vows are not accompanied by similar ceremonies, and even to divert some women who would otherwise have chosen a monastic vocation.

It was significantly due to Anne Leflaive's efforts over the following decades this ban was eventually rescinded in 1970. In 1939, Leflaive founded the secular missionaries of Catholic Action, an institute of celibate women or widows living in the world, which was, however, suppressed in 1946. Beginning in the 1940s, Leflaive was in contact with Angelo Roncalli, the future Pope John XXIII, and with Giovanni Montini, the future Pope Paul VI, who were receptive to her ideas. During the 1950s, Leflaive visited Rome once a year in order to lobby at the Vatican for the re-instatement of the rite of consecration of virgins. Leflaive published Study of the Consecrations of Virgins in the Roman Pontifical in 1934, re-edited as Espouse du Christ in 1956, and as La Femme et l'Eglise in 1968. At a time when the Reformed confessions began to introduce the ordination of women, Leflaive strictly rejected such a possibility, arguing that "Christ and His Church offer to the woman a gift of great plentitude [sic]" in the form of the Consecration of Virgins, already inscribed in the Roman Pontifical.

In 1950, Pius XII issued Sponsa Christi, an apostolic constitution addressing the vocation of nuns and their role in preserving the separate patrimony of the early virgins. This revived interest in the consecration of virgins. In his apostolic constitution, Pius XII decreed that only nuns living in enclosure were permitted to receive the liturgical consecration of virgins. In 1954, Pius cited Sponsa Christi in his encyclical Sacra Virginitas as showing the importance of the office of those "who had vowed their chastity to God".

This then is the primary purpose, this the central idea of Christian virginity: to aim only at the divine, to turn thereto the whole mind and soul; to want to please God in everything, to think of Him continually, to consecrate body and soul completely to Him.

In 1962, the rite De Benedictione et Consecratione Virginum ("On the Blessing and Consecration of Virgins") was revised, the first such revision made since 1595. The Second Vatican Council called for a further revision.

In 1963, the Second Vatican Council requested a revision of the rite of the consecration of virgins that was found in the Roman Pontifical. The revised rite was approved by Pope Paul VI and published in 1970. This consecration could be bestowed either on nuns in monastic orders or on women living in the world, the form of life that had been found in the early Church.

The 1970 rite of Ordo Consecrationis Virginum states the following requirements for women living in the world to receive the consecration: "that they have never married or lived in open violation of chastity; that, by their prudence and universally approved character, they give assurance of perseverance in a life of chastity dedicated to the service of the church and of their neighbor; that they be admitted to this Consecration by the Bishop who is the local Ordinary."

The newly consecrated virgin still receives a veil as a sign of her consecration, as in ancient times. The nuptial symbolism of the rite was displayed particularly in the bestowal of the veil on the virgin by the bishop, as can be found in the writings of Ambrose of Milan and in the oldest liturgical sources.

Consecrated virgins belong to the consecrated life. Those living in the world are not supported financially by their bishop, but must provide for their own upkeep. However, the early Church, a portion of the tithes went to the financial support of the virgins (Apost. Const. VIII. 30). Consecrated virgins work in professions ranging from teachers and attorneys to that of firefighter.

In 1972, Elizabeth Bailey became the first virgin to be consecrated under the revised rite in England, and the first known consecrated virgin living in the world in Britain since the 3rd century.

The number of consecrated virgins under the 1970 rite of consecration has grown into the thousands over the course of four decades. As of 2008, the United States Association of Consecrated Virgins (USACV) gave an "educated guess" of a total number of 3,000 consecrated virgins in 42 countries. In a 2015 survey, the Congregation for Institutes of Consecrated Life and Societies of Apostolic Life (CICLSAL) established an estimated number of 4,000 consecrated virgins in 78 countries, with a growing tendency, with a projected increase to about 5,000 by 2018.

The 1970 decree states as a requirement that candidates "have never married or lived in open violation of chastity". While the lack of a strict requirement of virginity was only implied by omission in the 1970 document, the Vatican on 4 July 2018 released a clarifying statement, explicitly conceding that: "to have kept her body in perfect continence or to have practised the virtue of chastity in an exemplary way, while of great importance with regard to the discernment, are not essential prerequisites in the absence of which admittance to consecration is not possible." The statement was published in reaction to bishops requesting clarification due to the growing number of women showing interest in the vocation. The new clause leaves it to the "good judgement and insight" of the bishop to discern the suitability of a candidate to her vocation.

The US Association of Consecrated Virgins released a statement calling the new guidance "shocking" and "deeply disappointing" as well as "intentionally convoluted and confusing":

The entire tradition of the Church has firmly upheld that a woman must have received the gift of virginity – that is, both material and formal (physical and spiritual) – in order to receive the consecration of virgins.

The instruction Ecclesiae Sponsae Imago on the Ordo virginum was published by the Congregation for Institutes of Consecrated Life and Societies of Apostolic Life in July, 2018. In June 2020, Pope Francis addressed a letter to the consecrated virgins on the occasion of the 50th anniversary of the promulgation of the revised rite of the Consecration of Virgins, calling their vocation as "a sign of hope".

== Rite of consecration ==
By the rite of consecration the diocesan bishop sets the virgin apart as a sacred person. The virgin who receives the consecration henceforth belongs to the consecrated life and becomes a member of the Order of Virgins. By receiving the sacramental constitutive consecration, she is "elevated to the dignity of bride of Christ, and joined by an indissoluble bond with the Son of God". This elevation into the role and reality of Bride of Christ occurs for the recipient of the consecration. The liturgical ritual contained in the Roman Pontifical has two forms, one for bestowing the consecration to women "living in the world" and the other for nuns. Thus, the Order of Virgins has members who live in the world and members who are nuns.

Both the consecration of a virgin living in the world and that of a nun are reserved to their diocesan bishop; it is for him to decide on the conditions under which a virgin living in the world is to undertake a life of perpetual virginity.

The approved liturgical rite whereby the bishop consecrates the candidate is by the solemn rite of Consecratio Virginum ('Consecration of Virgins'). The usual minister of the rite of consecration is the bishop who is the local ordinary. The consecrated virgin is committed to perpetual virginity and to leading a life of prayer and service. She is "strongly advised" to recite the Liturgy of the Hours daily, and is encouraged but not required to pray Lauds and Vespers.

The legislation outlining this, as it appears in the 1983 Code of Canon Law of the Catholic Church, says:

Canon 604

§1. Similar to these forms of consecrated life is the order of virgins, who, committed to the holy plan of following Christ more closely, are consecrated to God by the diocesan bishop according to the approved liturgical rite, are betrothed mystically to Christ, the Son of God, and are dedicated to the service of the Church.

§2. In order to observe their commitment more faithfully and to perform by mutual support service to the Church which is in harmony with their state these virgins can form themselves into associations.

== See also ==
- Christian monasticism
- Evangelical counsels
