= Saint Llamined =

Legendary saint of medieval Wales

Saint Llamined Angel, also known as Lleminod or Llyminod, is a fictional pre-congregational saint of medieval Wales invented by the 18th-century historian of ill-repute, Iolo Morganwg.

He is known from only one supposed manuscript of the seventeenth century, printed in the Iolo Manuscripts. Morganwg claimed that Llamined was the son of Pasgen ab Urien Rheged and brother of Saint Gwrfyw. The Venedotian Tribes of Collwyn ap Tangno and Marchweithian claimed descent from him.
