= Ffinian =

Irish 5th century saint

Saint Ffinian was an Irish 5th century saint who worked in Wales. He was a contemporary of Saint David who worked in Wales for thirty years establishing three churches. He is said to have met Saint David in 530AD. His feast day is 23 February.
