= Tudno =

Welsh saint

Saint Tudno
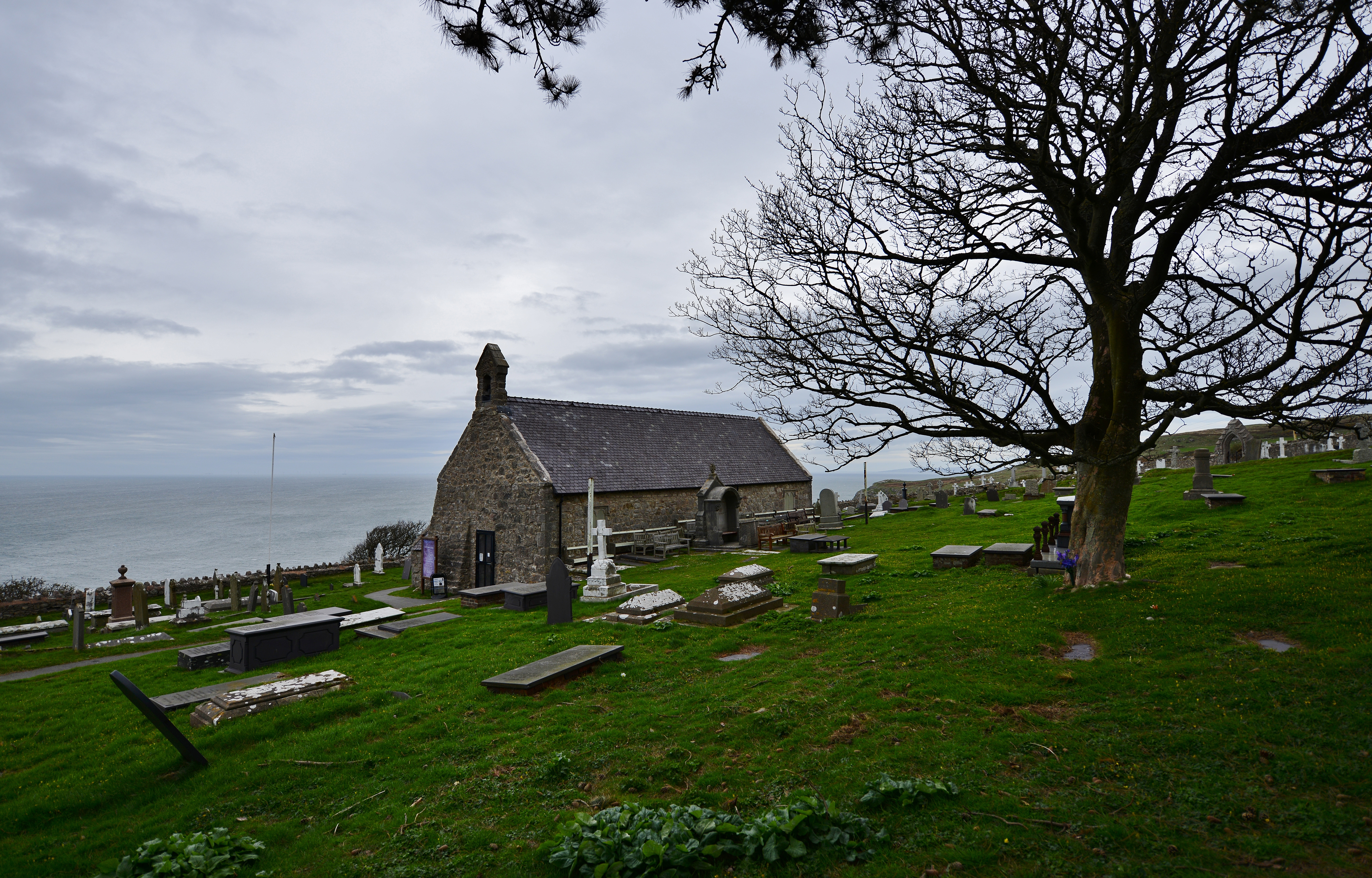
- The church on the Great Orme named after Saint Tudno
- Born: 6th century Wales
- Died: 6th century
- Venerated in: Church in Wales
- Canonized: Pre-congregation
- Major shrine: St Tudno's Church, Great Orme
- Feast: 5 June
- Patronage: Llandudno

Saint Tudno (Welsh: [ˈtɨd.nɔ]) is the patron saint of Llandudno (whose name is derived from his), and founder of the original parish church, located on the Great Orme peninsula.

== Origins ==
Saint Tudno is said to have been one of the seven sons of King Seithenyn, whose legendary kingdom Cantref y Gwaelod in Cardigan Bay was submerged by tidal activity. According to the theory, Tudno studied at St Dunawd's college in the monastery of Bangor Iscoed, in order to make recompense for the drunken incompetence of his father, which had led to the loss of the kingdom under the waves.

== Llandudno ==
Seeking a place to live out the religious life, Tudno went to the great ancient limestone outcrop of the Great Orme (Cyngreawdr), jutting from the Creuddyn Peninsula, to bring the message of Christianity to its people. He lived initially as a hermit in a small coastal cave with difficult access known as Ogof Llech, which provided protection from the elements, and a source of fresh water from a spring well Ffynnon Llech. From this base he constructed a church. Nothing remains of this 6th century church building, although the present 12th century church, dedicated to St Tudno, stands on the same site, and has a continuous history.

The church is still open for worship, and the patronal festival is still celebrated on 5 June annually; local records record the importance of this local holiday historically. The churchyard is now closed for burials, however the adjoining Great Orme Cemetery, opened in 1903 remains in use and has been extended several times.

In the early 20th century coffins (and mourners) were transported for burial via the Great Orme Tramway, for which purpose three special tramcars (numbered 1, 2, and 3) were available. Currently tram #4 is named St Tudno.
