= Seithenyn =

Welsh legendary figure

Seithenyn (sometimes spelt Seithennin) sometimes known as Seithenyn of the feeble mind is a figure from Welsh legend, apparently contemporary with King Gwyddno Garanhir. He is mentioned in a poem in the Llyfr Du Caerfyrddin (Black Book of Carmarthen), but becomes the protagonist of the story in a later version of the legend, in which he was responsible for the sea-defences of Cantre'r Gwaelod (English: The Lowland Hundred) or Maes Gwyddno (English: the Plain of Gwyddno), in the kingdom of the legendary Gwyddno Garanhir, but neglected them one night because of his drunkenness. Because of this neglect, the sea overran it.

Cantre'r Gwaelod is said to lie beneath the waters of Cardigan Bay off the coast of Ceredigion near Aberdyfi, Wales. Seithenyn (named in some later sources as being the son of Seithyn Saidi), was in charge of the embankment there, and as such, it was his failure to discharge his duties which led to its drowning. Seithenyn is also listed in the Triads of the Island of Britain as one of the Three Disgraceful Drunkards of the Isle of Britain. (Note: Triad 37 reads "The three disgraceful drunkards on the Isle of Britain: First, Ceraint, the drunken king of Siluria, who in drunkenness burned all the corn far and near over all the country, so that a famine for bread arose. Second, Vortigern, who in his drink gave the Isle of Thanet to Horsa that he might commit adultery with Rowena his daughter, and who also gave a claim to the son that he had by her to the crown of Lloegria; and added to these, treachery and plotting against the Cambrians. Third, the drunken Seithynin, son of Seithyn Saida king of Dimetia, who in his drunkenness let the sea over the hundred of Gwaelod so that all the houses and land which were there, were lost; where before that event sixteen fortified towns were reckoned there, superior to all the towns and fortifications in Cambria, with the exception of Caerllion upon Usk. The hundred of Gwaelod was a dominion of Gwydnaw Garanhir, king of Cardigan. This event happened in the time of Ambrosius. The people who escaped from the inundation landed in Ardudwy, in the country of Arvon, and the mountains of Snowdon, and other places, which had not been inhabited before that period.")

The Welsh saint Saint Tudno (founder and patron of Llandudno) may have been Seithenyn's son.

He appears as a character in Thomas Love Peacock's 1829 Arthurian novel The Misfortunes of Elphin.

Sir John Rhys posited a connection between Seithenyn and the Setantii, a Celtic tribe living in what is now the north west of England.

== Bibliography ==
- Bromwich, Rachel (15 June 2016). Trioedd Ynys Prydein: The Triads of the Island of Britain. University of Wales Press. ISBN 978-1-78316-305-2.
- Rhys, John (1901). Celtic folklore, Welsh and Manx. Oxford : Clarendon Press. p. 385.
- Peacock, Thomas Love (1829). The Misfortunes of Elphin. Thomas Hookham.
