= Caw of Strathclyde =

King of Strathclyde in Scotland (?-501)

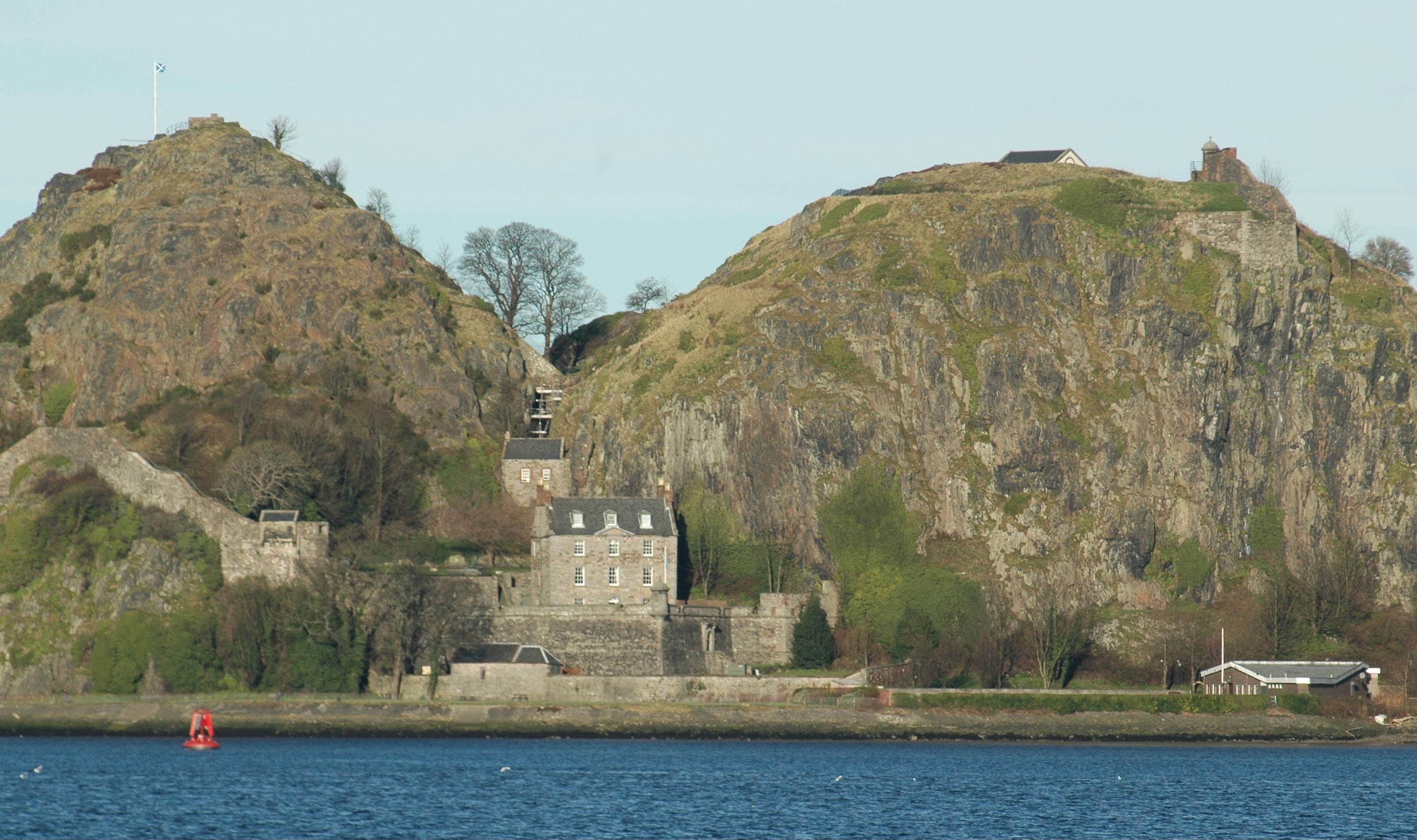
Looking north at Dumbarton Rock, chief fort of Strathclyde from the 6th century to 870. The fort of Alt Clut was on the right-hand summit.

King Caw or Cawn (fl. 495–501 AD) was a semi-legendary king of Strathclyde in Scotland.

Very little hard fact is known of him. He flourished in the Hen Ogledd Period of Sub-Roman Britain and ruled from a castle at Alt Clut. Legend holds he fought King Arthur. He came to power in 495 AD by deposing King Tutagual, but only managed to remain in power for six years before being removed from power himself. This was a very turbulent time and coincided with the Anglo-Saxon invasion of England. Following this he fled to Wales.

== Children ==
He was a father of many children, many of whom were saints. The most well-known was Gildas, which possibly accounts for the poor presentation of King Arthur (and also Constantine) in Gildas' writing. His children are reputed to include:

- Hywel
- Ane
- Aneurin
- Saint Caffo
- Ceidio
- Aeddan Foeddog
- Cwyllog
- Dirynig
- Saint Cain
- Saint Eigrad
- Saint Eigron
- Gwenafwy
- Gallo
- Saint Peirio
- Cewydd
- Maelog
- Meilig
- Gwrddelw
- Gwrhai
- Huail mab caw

== See also ==
- Romano-British
- early Dark Ages,
- Wales in the Early Middle Ages
