= Tathan =

Saint Tathan

Saint
- Born: Ireland
- Died: Wales
- Venerated in: Christian Church
- Patronage: St Athan

Saint Tathan (also known as Tatheus) is claimed to be a fifth or sixth century Celtic saint, who travelled from Ireland to Wales where he founded a Christian church. He is reckoned an early abbot of Caerwent and has dedications at Llanvaches, near Caerwent, also known as Llandathan, and at St Athan. He is said to have been a teacher of Cadoc and to have brought light to the heathens to undo the work of Satan.

== Origins ==
William Jenkins Rees, in his book Lives of the Cambro British Saints, describes Tathan as the only son of the Irish King Tathetus. Tathan received a good education and devoted himself to spiritual matters. In preference to succeeding his father as king, Tathan followed the advice of an angel and sailed from Ireland to Britain, taking eight disciples with him. His boat sailed up the River Severn and landed in the medieval Kingdom of Gwent. Tathan was feted by King Caradoc and founded a monastic school at Venta Silurum (Caerwent). Scholars came from all parts to be instructed there. King Gwynllyw of Gwynllwg sent his seven-year-old son, Cadoc to study under Tathan. With a donation from Caradoc's son, Ynyr, Tathan then founded a Christian church.
