= Dwygyfylchi =

Village in Conwy County Borough, Wales

Coordinates: 53.277°N 3.896°W

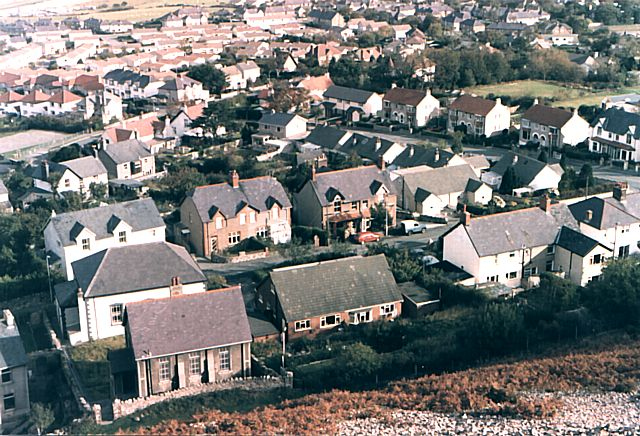
- Dwygyfylchi from above Capel Horeb

- Location within Conwy
- Population: 1,485
- OS grid reference: SH736773
- Community: Penmaenmawr
- Principal area: Conwy
- Country: Wales
- Sovereign state: United Kingdom
- Post town: PENMAENMAWR
- Postcode district: LL34
- Dialling code: 01492
- Police: North Wales
- Fire: North Wales
- Ambulance: Welsh
- UK Parliament: Bangor Aberconwy
- Senedd Cymru – Welsh Parliament: Aberconwy

Dwygyfylchi (Welsh: [dʊɨɡəˈvəlχi]) is a village in Conwy County Borough, Wales. It is part of the community of Penmaenmawr which has a population of 4,353. The electoral ward of Capelulo which includes Dwygyfylchi had a population of 1,485 in 2011. It forms part of the historic county of Caernarfonshire.

== Name ==
The name Dwygyfylchi is derived from the Welsh dwy, "two", and cyfylchi, a word used almost exclusively in placenames meaning a "circular fortress"; it was first recorded as "Dwykyvelchy" in 1287. There are several old fortifications on the surrounding hills. The origin of the name Capelulo, the original settlement, lies in its association with Saint Ulo.

== Geography ==
Approximately half of Dwygyfylchi forms the most northern tip of the Snowdonia National Park. Half a mile to the south-east of the main village lies Capelulo, which lies at the foot of the picturesque Sychnant Pass, which connects Dwygyfylchi to Conwy. The Pensychnant Conservation Centre and Nature Reserve is nearby. Two headlands separate Dwygyfylchi & Penmaenmawr from its neighbours. Towards the east Penmaenbach divides Dwygyfylchi from the neighbouring town of Conwy Morfa and the Conwy Valley leading up to Betws-y-Coed. To the west the larger headland of Penmaenmawr divides them from the town of Llanfairfechan and the wider coastal plain extending to Bangor. To the south an arc of hills and uplands extends east to west from the latter to Penmaen Mawr, beginning with Yr Allt Wen above Dwygyfylchi, Bwlch Sychnant (the old road crosses this pass to Conwy) and Pen-sychnant at Capelulo. The rounded hill of Foel Lys, Gwddw Glas (Green Gorge), Bryn Derwydd and the head of Cwm Graiglwyd and finally Penmaenmawr itself. The coastal plain itself is nearly divided by Trwyn-yr-Wylfa, which also marks the boundary between the "Hen Bentra" or "Old Village" of Dwygyfylchi and Capelulo in the east and Pant-yr-afon and Penmaenan in the west . Finally two small rivers flow through the area. The first and larger, Afon Gyrrach, runs for about 4 miles (6.4 km) from the northern slopes of Tal-y-Fan to the sea near Penmaenbach, passing through Nant Ddaear-y-llwynog ("Fairy Glen") and the old villages of Dwygyfylchi and Capelulo. The second, Afon Pabwyr, runs down from wooded Cwm Graiglwyd then under the town centre, Pant-yr-afon, to the beach.

== History ==
The surrounding landscape is dotted with palaeolithic, mesolithic, neolithic, Bronze Age and Iron Age structures, including cromlechs, standing stones, stone circles and hill forts. Notable Iron Age hill forts in the area are Caer Seion, at the summit of Conwy mountain, and nearby Braich-y-Dinas, one of the largest Iron Age hill-forts in Europe (and comparable with Tre'r Ceiri near Trefor on the Llŷn peninsula), at the summit of Penmaenmawr. Nothing remains of Braich-y-Dinas, however, as the last remnants were destroyed in the 1920s. The 1868 National Gazetteer of Great Britain and Ireland notes: "In this neighbourhood are a great number of antiquities, consisting of cromlechs and single upright stones, the remains of a British camp, with ditches and ramparts, &c."

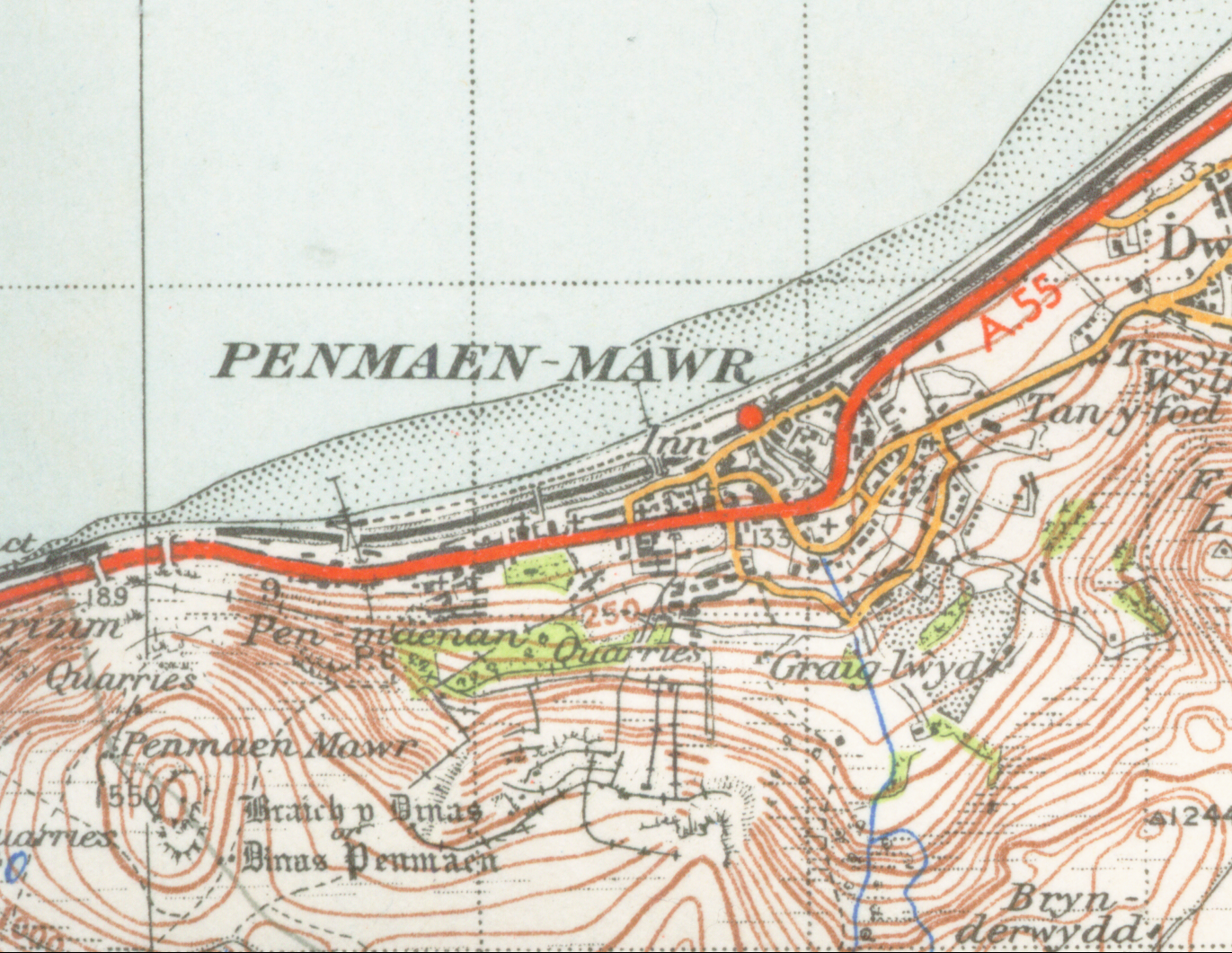
A map of Penmaenmawr from 1947

About a mile or so north of Dwygyfylchi & Penmaenmawr lies Llys Helig. This has been said to have been the palace of Prince Helig ap Glanawg or Glannog who lived in the 6th century Prince Helig ap Glanawg owned a large area of land between the Great Orme's Head near Llandudno and the Menai Strait off the north coast of Gwynedd. This area was inundated by the sea which has given rise to the legend of the drowned kingdom. The legend states the remains of Llys Helig, said to be his palace, can be seen at exceptionally low tides, this being near the Conwy channel, about a mile or so off the coast at Penmaenmawr. The earliest known use of the name Llys Helig regarding this rock formation is the Halliwell Manuscript which is believed to date to around the beginning of the 15th century, nine centuries later. The Llys Helig rock formation is a glacial moraine left behind by previous subsequent ice ages. There is a fish weir south of this which tradition dates to the beginning of the 6th century which was used up until the early 20th century. The sea level was low enough around 1600 AD to make the claims of Sir John Wynne of Gwydir feasible.

The Church in Wales parish church, dedicated to Saint Gwynin or Gwynan, was built between 1888 and 1889. The pews of the present church were made from the roof timbers of the earlier church building constructed in 1760, the foundation stone of which was preserved and mounted on the vestry wall of the present church, where it can still be seen. St Gwynin's gwyl mabsant (Patronal Festival) is 31 December. Dwygyfylchi is also associated with Saint Ulo, Capelulo at the foot of Sychnant reputedly having been the site of an early medieval church. In 1851, in addition to the parish church, with a congregation of 80 and 20 scholars, the village had also a Wesleyan Methodist chapel at Penmaenmawr (erected 1841), a Welsh Calvinistic Methodist one at Pen y cae Chappel (erected 1818, rebuilt 1840), and a Horeb Nonconformist (Independent) chapel (erected 1813).

== Administrative history ==
Dwygyfylchi was an ancient parish within the historic county of Caernarfonshire. In 1866 the parish was made a local government district, administered by an elected local board. In 1890, the district's name was changed from Dwygyfylchi to Penmaenmawr, in recognition that Penmaenmawr had become the largest settlement in the district.

Such local government districts were reconstituted as urban districts under the Local Government Act 1894. The name of the civil parish remained Dwygyfylchi until 1974, when civil parishes were abolished in Wales. As an urban parish, Dwygyfylchi had no separate parish council, with Penmaenmawr Urban District Council being the local authority. Penmaenmawr Urban District was abolished in 1974, with its area becoming a community called Penmaenmawr.

== Amenities, clubs and societies ==
Penmaenmawr Golf Club has a 9-hole course located between Dwygyfylchi and Capelulo. Near to this is Dwygyfylchi Bowling Club. Penmaenmawr Phoenix F.C. plays in the Clwyd Premier League and is located between Dwygyfylchi and Penmaenmawr. This as one of only two roundabouts on the A55

At the top of the Sychnant Pass is Pen Sychnant Nature Reserve, a conservation area of 12 acres (5 ha) with mature shrubs and woodland.

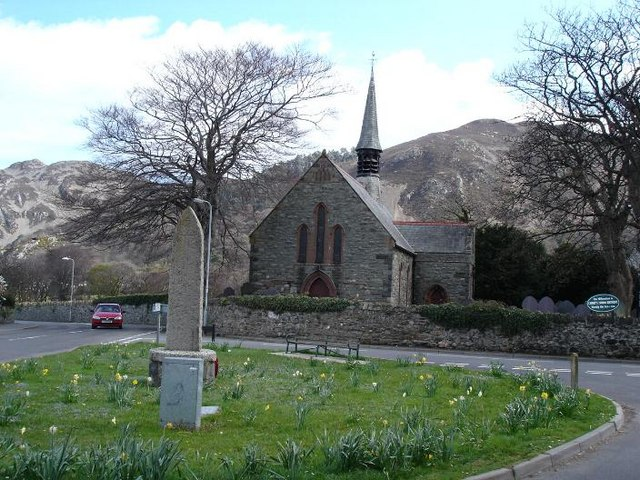
The parish church of St Gwynin, at the centre of the village

== Transport ==
=== Bus ===
Arriva Buses Wales operates services 5 and X5 every 15 minutes between Caernarfon and Llandudno; eastbound, service X5 serves Deganwy and Maesdu and service 5 serves St Gwynan's (for Dwygyfylchi) and Craig-y-don; westbound, both services serve Bangor and Y Felinheli (Port Dinorwic).

Padarn Bus operate a Saturday service (service X2) that runs direct from Penmaenmawr, eastbound to Llandudno and westbound to Llanberis (via Bangor).

Llew Jones runs the Conwy Clipa service 75 between Llanfairfechan and Llandudno.

=== Road ===
Dwygyfylchi lies on the route of the A55 Expressway providing access at Junction 16 and at 16A to Penmaenmawr to and from the rest of the north coast. Junction 16 is one of just two roundabouts on the A55 between Chester and Holyhead and is due to be replaced by a grade separated interchange. A mountain route through Capelulo links the towns to Conwy via Sychnant.
