= Rhychwyn =

6th-century Welsh saint

Rhychwyn was a 6th century saint of North Wales and the patron saint of Llanrhychwyn.

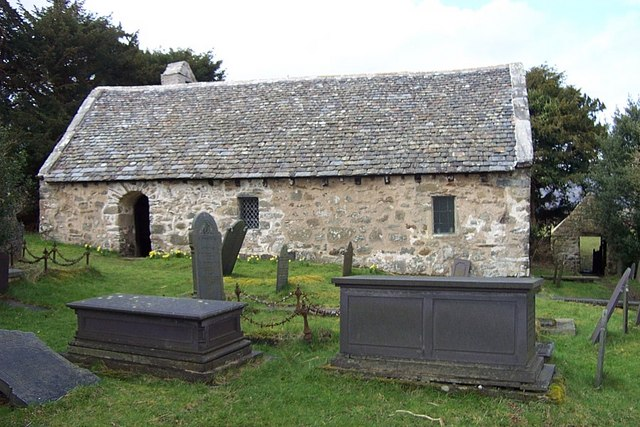
St Rhychwyn's Church, Llanrhychwyn

Rhychwyn (sometimes recorded as Rhochwyn), was a son of Helig ap Glannog, the prince who lived at Llys Helig before it was inundated by the sea, and now the subject of myth and legend. Rhychwyn had several brothers who established churches and became saints, including Saint Celynin, who established the old church at Llangelynnin, near Henryd, further down the valley. Rhychwyn church is possibly the oldest church building in Wales.
