= Llanrhychwyn =

Hamlet in Conwy County Borough, Wales

Coordinates: 53.140°N 3.829°W

- Hamlet
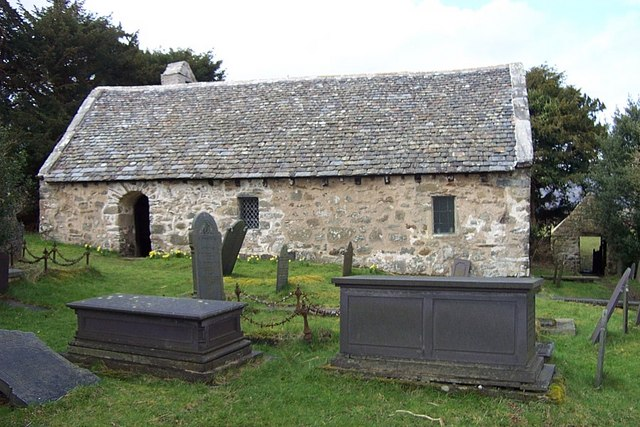
- Llanrhychwyn church

- Location within Conwy
- OS grid reference: SH776619
- Community: Trefriw
- Principal area: Conwy
- Country: Wales
- Sovereign state: United Kingdom
- Post town: TREFRIW
- Postcode district: LL27
- Dialling code: 01492
- Police: North Wales
- Fire: North Wales
- Ambulance: Welsh
- UK Parliament: Bangor Aberconwy
- Senedd Cymru – Welsh Parliament: Aberconwy

Llanrhychwyn is a hamlet in Conwy county borough, Wales. It lies in the Conwy valley, less than a mile south of Trefriw, and a mile north-west of Llanrwst. Today neighbouring Trefriw is a village with a population of around 600, but in the time of Llywelyn Fawr (Llywelyn the Great), and up to the early 19th century, Llanrhychwyn was larger than Trefriw, which consisted simply of "a few houses here and there" (quote from Hanes Trefriw, by Morris Jones). Indeed, even today both Trefriw and Llanrhychwyn lie within the parish of Llanrhychwyn. The area around Llanrhychwyn had a population of only 178 in 2011.

The adjacent Gwydir Forest would have provided work for many of the inhabitants. A number of small slate quarries and metal mines were located in the forest, and the heyday of metal mining here was between 1850 and 1919. The forest also provided wood, and timber, slate and metal ores were transported from the forest to the quay at neighbouring Trefriw, from where it was shipped downstream to the coast.

Llanrhychwyn takes its name from Saint Rhychwyn (sometimes recorded as Rhochwyn), son of Helig ap Glannog, the prince who lived at Llys Helig before it was inundated by the sea, and now the subject of myth and legend. Rhychwyn had several brothers who established churches and became saints, including Celynin, who established the old church at Llangelynnin, near Henryd, further down the valley.

== St Rhychwyn's Church ==
Llanrhychwyn's main claim to fame is its parish church, which many claim is the oldest in Wales, marking the site where Rhychwyn originally established his church in the 6th century. The church is known locally as Llewelyn's Church, and the oldest part dates from the late 11th century.

Llywelyn Fawr, Prince of Gwynedd and de facto Prince of Wales, had a hunting lodge in Trefriw, close to Llanrhychwyn, known in documents as 'Y Ty Du'. Llywelyn married Siwan or Joan a daughter of King John of England in 1205. In about 1230 Llywelyn endowed another church for the local community living on the valley bottom in the commotal centre, on the site where St Mary's, Trefriw now stands. Llywelyn and Siwan are portrayed in a remarkable stained glass window in the church, as are Rhychwyn and David in a window dating from 1533. An inscription in Latin asks for prayers for the donors. Morris Jones also records in Welsh that this church was "built by Llywelyn for [his wife's] use, and for the use of the inhabitants, for their kindness towards him, and that he donated a number of farms from the parish of Llanrhychwyn, naming them as the parish of Tref Rhiw Las. It got this name from the slope on which it stood".

Set within an ancient churchyard, the church is a good example of early architecture. The east aisle was added in the 13th century, and the north aisle dates from the 16th century. It has a very old square font, as old as the church itself, and an early example of stained glass in the east window. The roof beams, some 800 years old, are the earliest example in Wales. The ancient oak door has wooden hinges, and the bell, which dates from the 13th century, possibly came from Maenan Abbey. The altar rails date from 1616, and the pulpit from 1691. The chalice is dated 1614 and is of an ornate design. The registers date from 1594.

Services are only held in Llanrhychwyn church during the summer months, and on special occasions. If locked, the key is available from Tu hwnt i'r Gors Farm, nearby. St Rhychwyn's Church is a Grade I listed building.

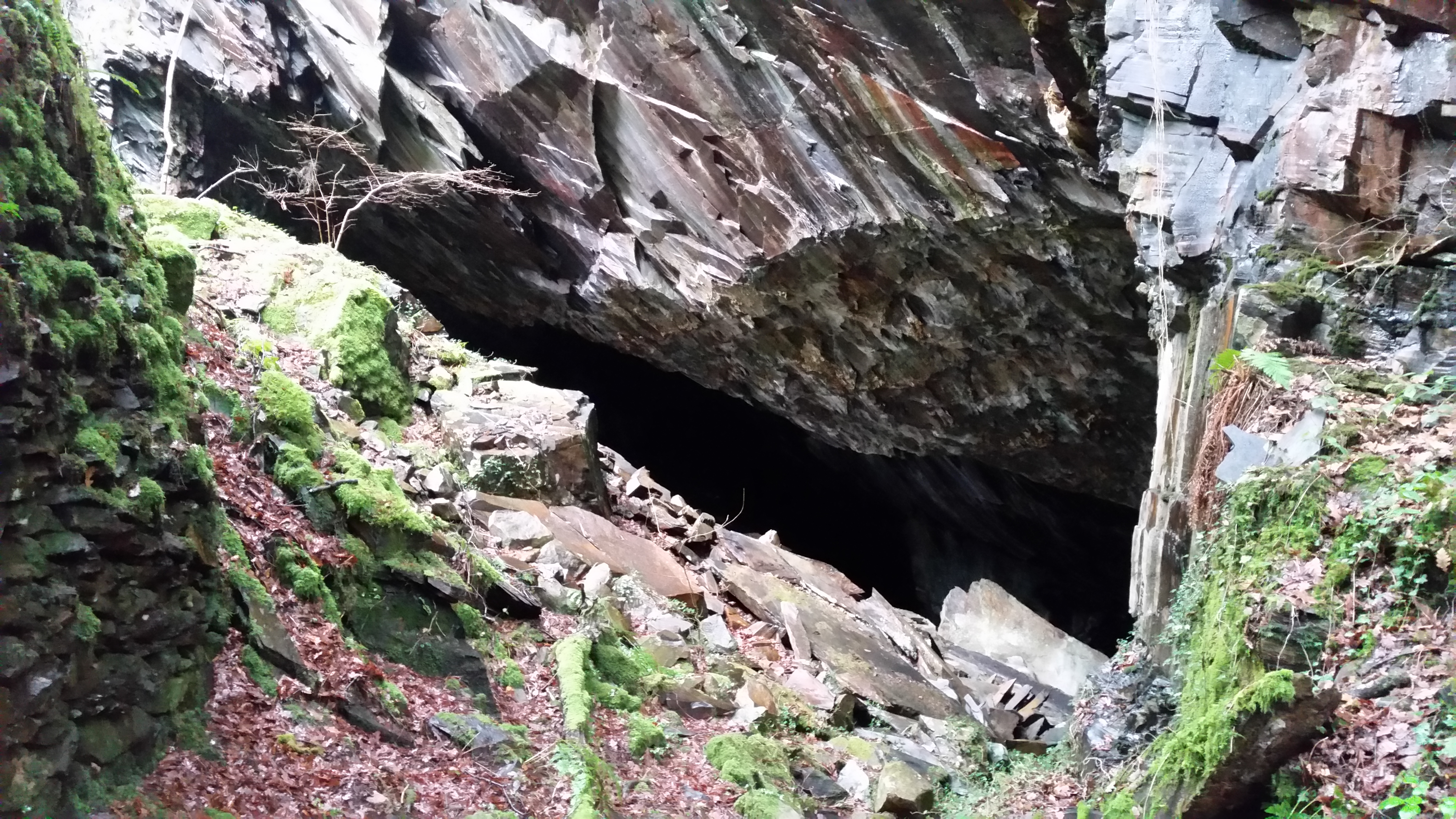
Old slate quarry cavern at Llanrhychwyn

== Famous inhabitants ==
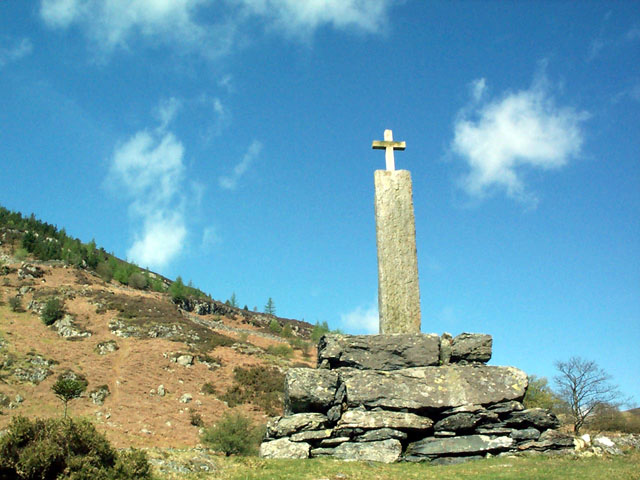
The Taliesin monument, overlooking Llyn Geirionydd

A popular belief, based on a misinterpretation of a line of poetry in the Red Book of Hergest by 18th- and early 19th-century antiquarian scholars, is that Taliesin (c. 534–c.599), the 6th-century Welsh bard and the earliest poet of the Welsh language whose work has survived, was an inhabitant of the area, living on the shores of Llyn Geirionydd and buried there. It has even been claimed that he was also born in this area, but it is far more likely that he was born in Powys, as demonstrated by his poems to Cynan Garwyn, King of Powys.

Robert Williams (Trebor Mai) (1830–77) was born near the parish church and grew up in the village. He later moved to Llanrwst and became one of the most famous poets of his day, being particularly admired for his mastery of the englyn.

John Roberts (1828–1904) was a native of neighbouring Trefriw, and he used that name in his job as a printer and bookseller. In Eisteddfodau he would assume the bardic name of Gwilym Cowlyd, and frequently levelled criticism at the Gorsedd for being too Anglicised. In 1865, he founded a separate festival to rival the big National Eisteddfod, and called it Arwest Glan Geirionydd (‘Music Festival on the Banks of the River Geirionydd’), and the meeting point was the Taliesin Memorial by Llyn Geirionydd.

Richard Owen Roberts, the father of Gwilym Roberts the storyteller, was born in Llanrhychwyn.

== A popular walking area ==
Today many walkers pass through Llanrhychwyn on their way to or from the Gwydir Forest, a popular area of lakes and forest walks. The lane through Llanrhychwyn continues from Trefriw or Llanrwst (via several gates) to Llyn Geirionydd, one of the most popular lakes in the area. Over the hill (Mynydd Deulyn) from Llyn Geirionydd is Llyn Crafnant, reached only by car from Trefriw, and regarded by many as one of the most beautiful spots in Wales. Most of the tourist traffic passing through Llanrhychwyn is totally unaware of the historical significance of the hamlet, and indeed the road itself does not actually pass the old church.

One of the "Trefriw Trail" walks passes Llanrhychwyn Church.
