= Helig ap Glanawg =

Welsh prince

Helig ap Glanawg (standard modern Welsh orthography: Helig ap Glannog) is a legendary figure described in various accounts dating to at least as early as the 13th century as a 6th-century prince who lived in North Wales.

Post-medieval tradition says that the river Conwy once reached the sea by the Great Orme, Llandudno, and to the west lay the great cantref of Gwaelod which stretched all the way to Puffin Island, off Anglesey. Helig ap Glanawg was said to have lived here when his land was inundated by the sea, which formed the Lavan Sands which lie between the Great Orme's Head and the Menai Strait off the north coast of Gwynedd. The legend states the remains of Llys Helig, said to be his palace but in fact the remnants of a glacial moraine, can be seen at exceptionally low tides, this being near the Conwy channel, about a mile or so off the coast at Penmaenmawr. The earliest known use of the name Llys Helig for this rock formation is the Halliwell Manuscript, published in 1859, which is believed to date to around the beginning of the 17th century, eleven centuries later.

== Sons ==
After the disaster both Helig and his numerous sons are said to have embraced a religious life. These sons, according to various sources, were:

- Celynnin, who has a church dedicated to him at Llangelynnin in the Conwy valley, and there is another at Llangelynnin near Llwyngwril, a few miles south of Llanaber
- Rhychwyn, the saint associated with St Rhychwyn's Church, Llanrhychwyn
- Bodfan, to whom the church at Llanaber, in Gwynedd, is dedicated
- Brothen, who founded St Brothen's Church, Llanfrothen
- Peris, who founded the churches at Llanberis and Nant Peris
- Boda and Gwynin, who founded the church at Dwygyfylchi, near Penmaenmawr

== Legend possibly of the same origin as that of Cantre'r Gwaelod ==
Rachel Bromwich discusses what she refers to as the folk-tale of Cantre'r Gwaelod, another alleged sunken kingdom but in Cardiganshire. As with Llys Helig, there are tales of remains being seen of the sunken kingdom. Bromwich believes that the two stories influenced each other, and that "The widespread parallels to this inundation theme would suggest that the two stories are in fact one in origin, and were localized separately in Cardiganshire and in the Conway estuary, around two traditional figures of the sixth century. She also notes that the Halliwell Manuscript gives Helig the title "Lord of Cantre'r Gwaelod". In the book New Directions In Celtic Studies Antone Minard wrote that "The Welsh legends of Cantre'r Gwaelod and Llys Helig (Helig's Court) contain the same details of audible bells beneath the waves and ruins which are visible at the equinoctial tides, which are the anchors of credulity in the story".
