= Llangelynnin =

Llangelynnin may refer to:

- Llangelynnin, Conwy, a former parish in Conwy County Borough, Wales
- Llangelynnin, Gwynedd, a village and community in Gwynedd, Wales
