= Cantre'r Gwaelod =

Legendary sunken kingdom west of Wales

Coordinates: 52.5°N 4.5°W

- Welsh mythology location
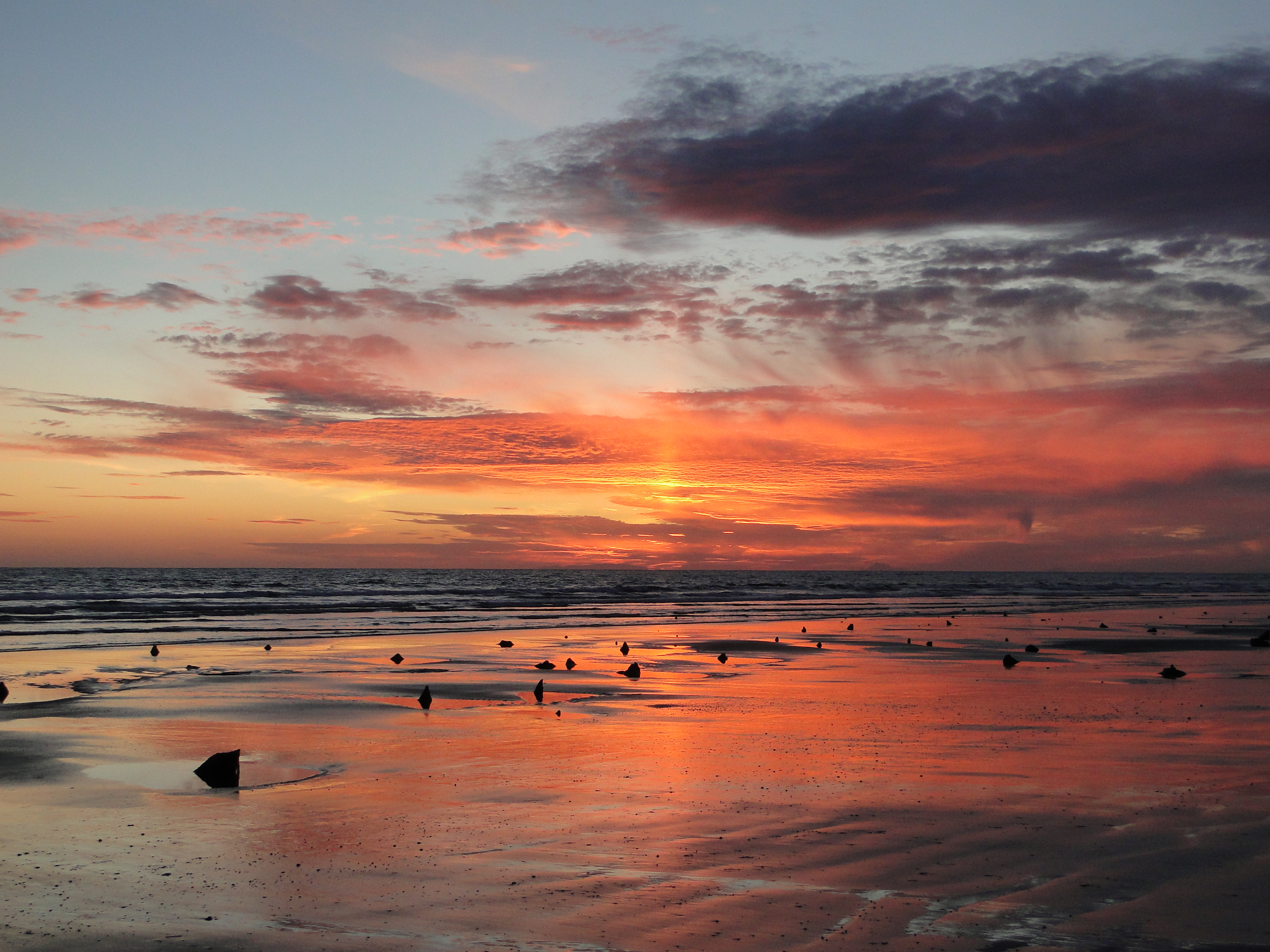
- Part of an ancient submerged forest at Ynyslas thought to be associated with Cantre'r Gwaelod
- Genre: Legend

In-universe information
- Type: Sunken kingdom
- Locations: Caer Wyddno
- Characters: Gwyddno Garanhir; Seithenyn; Elffin ap Gwyddno

Cantre'r Gwaelod, also known as Cantref y Gwaelod, is a legendary ancient sunken kingdom said to have occupied a tract of fertile land lying between Ramsey Island and Bardsey Island in what is now Cardigan Bay to the west of Wales. It has been described as a "Welsh Atlantis" and has featured in Welsh Mythology, folklore, literature, and folk music for centuries.

== Toponymy ==
Cantre'r Gwaelod and Cantref-y-Gwaelod are Welsh terms, meaning 'The Lowland Hundred' or 'Lowland Cantref'. Gwaelod means 'low lying', and Cantre(f) is usually translated as 'Hundred' (the medieval division of land) or kept untranslated as Cantref.

== The legend ==
Cantre'r Gwaelod, according to legend, was located in an area west of present-day Wales which is now under the waters of Cardigan Bay. Accounts variously suggest the tract of land extended from Bardsey Island to Cardigan or as far south as Ramsey Island. Legends of the land suggest that it may have extended 20 miles west of the present coast.

There are several versions of the myth. The earliest known form of the legend is usually said to appear in the Black Book of Carmarthen, in which the land is referred to as Maes Gwyddno (Welsh for 'the Plain of Gwyddno'). In this version, the land was lost to floods when a well-maiden named Mererid neglected her duties and allowed the well to overflow.

The popular version known today is thought to have been formed from the 17th century onwards. Cantre'r Gwaelod is described as a low-lying land fortified against the sea by a dyke, Sarn Badrig ("Saint Patrick's road"), with a series of sluice gates that were opened at low tide to drain the land.

Cantre'r Gwaelod's capital was Caer Wyddno, seat of the ruler Gwyddno Garanhir. Two princes of the realm held charge over the dyke. One of these princes, called Seithenyn, is described in one version as a notorious drunkard and carouser, and it was through his negligence that the sea swept through the open floodgates, ruining the land.

The church bells of Cantre'r Gwaelod are said to ring out in times of danger.

=== Relationship to myth of Llys Helig ===
Rachel Bromwich raises questions over the location, stating: "There is no certainty, however, that in twelfth century tradition Maes Gwyddneu did represent the submerged land in Cardigan Bay." She also links Gwyddno Garanhir with the Old North, not Wales. She further discusses a similar tale, that of the submergence of the kingdom of Helig ap Glanawg in the Conwy estuary. As with Cantre'r Gwaelod, there are tales of remains being seen of the sunken kingdom (Llys Helig). Bromwich believes that the two stories influenced each other, and that "The widespread parallels to this inundation theme would suggest that the two stories are in fact one in origin, and were localized separately in Cardiganshire and in the Conway estuary, around two traditional figures of the sixth century. She also notes that J.O Halliwell in his 1859 text An Ancient Survey of Pen Maen Mawr gives Helig the title "Lord of Cantre'r Gwaelod". In the book New Directions In Celtic Studies Antone Minard wrote that "The Welsh legends of Cantre'r Gwaelod and Llys Helig (Helig's Court) contain the same details of audible bells beneath the waves and ruins which are visible at the equinoctial tides, which are the anchors of credulity in the story".

=== Relationship to myth of Teithi Hen ===
In the tale of Culhwch and Olwen, one of the Welsh Triads, one of the men at Arthur's court is named as Teithi Hen ap Gwynnan, whose land was inundated, and only he escaped. He is also mentioned in Cronica de Wallia, part of the Annales Cambriae, and the lost land is called Ynys Teithi Hen. This legend has similarities to Cantre'r Gwaelod but there is no direct connection with Seithennin. The location is placed west of Dyfed, or between Anglesey and Ireland.

== Physical evidence ==
Cardigan Bay, supposed location of Cantre'r Gwaelod

There is no reliable physical evidence of the substantial community that according to legend lies under the sea, although there are several reports of remains being sighted.

In 1770, Welsh antiquarian scholar William Owen Pughe reported seeing sunken human habitations about four miles (6 km) off the Ceredigion coast, between the rivers Ystwyth and Teifi.

In the 1846 edition of The Topographical Dictionary of Wales, Samuel Lewis described a feature of stone walls and causeways beneath the shallow waters of Cardigan Bay:

In the sea, about seven miles west of Aberystwyth in Cardiganshire, is a collection of loose stones, termed Caer Wyddno, "the fort or palace of Gwyddno;" and adjoining it are vestiges of one of the more southern causeways or embankments of Catrev Gwaelod. The depth of water over the whole extent of the bay of Cardigan is not great; and on the recess of the tide, stones bearing Latin inscriptions, and Roman coins of various emperors, have been found below high-water mark: in different places in the water, also, are observed prostrate trees."

— Samuel Lewis, The Topographical Dictionary of Wales.

Lewis takes the view that maps by the cartographer Ptolemy marked the coastline of Cardigan Bay in the same location as it appears in modern times, suggesting that the flood occurred before the second century AD.

The "causeways" described by Lewis can be seen today at beaches around Cardigan Bay. Known as sarnau, these ridges stretch several miles into the sea at right angles to the coast, and are located between each of the four river mouths in the north of Cardigan Bay. Modern geologists surmise that these formations of clay, gravel and rocks are moraines formed by the action of melting glaciers at the end of the last ice age. In a 2006 episode of the BBC television documentary Coast, visited Sarn Gynfelyn. The programme also showed the remains of the submerged forest at Ynyslas, near Borth which is associated with the lost land of Cantre'r Gwaelod. The vista of dead oak, pine, birch, willow and hazel tree stumps preserved by the acid anaerobic conditions in the soil is revealed at low tide; storms in 2010 and 2014, and particularly Storm Hannah in 2019, have eroded the sea-bed offshore and revealed more stumps. The forest is estimated to have been submerged between 4,000 and 5,000 years ago.

Evidence of human habitation includes a timber walkway made of coppiced branches and upright posts, human footprints preserved in hardened peat, and burnt stones thought to be from hearths.

In 2022, geographer Simon Haslett and linguist David Willis published research suggesting that the medieval Gough Map provides evidence for two offshore islands within Cardigan Bay. These were suggested as "likely to be the remnants of a low-lying landscape underlain by soft glacial deposits laid down during the last ice age which has since been dissected by rivers and truncated by the sea".

=== Images ===
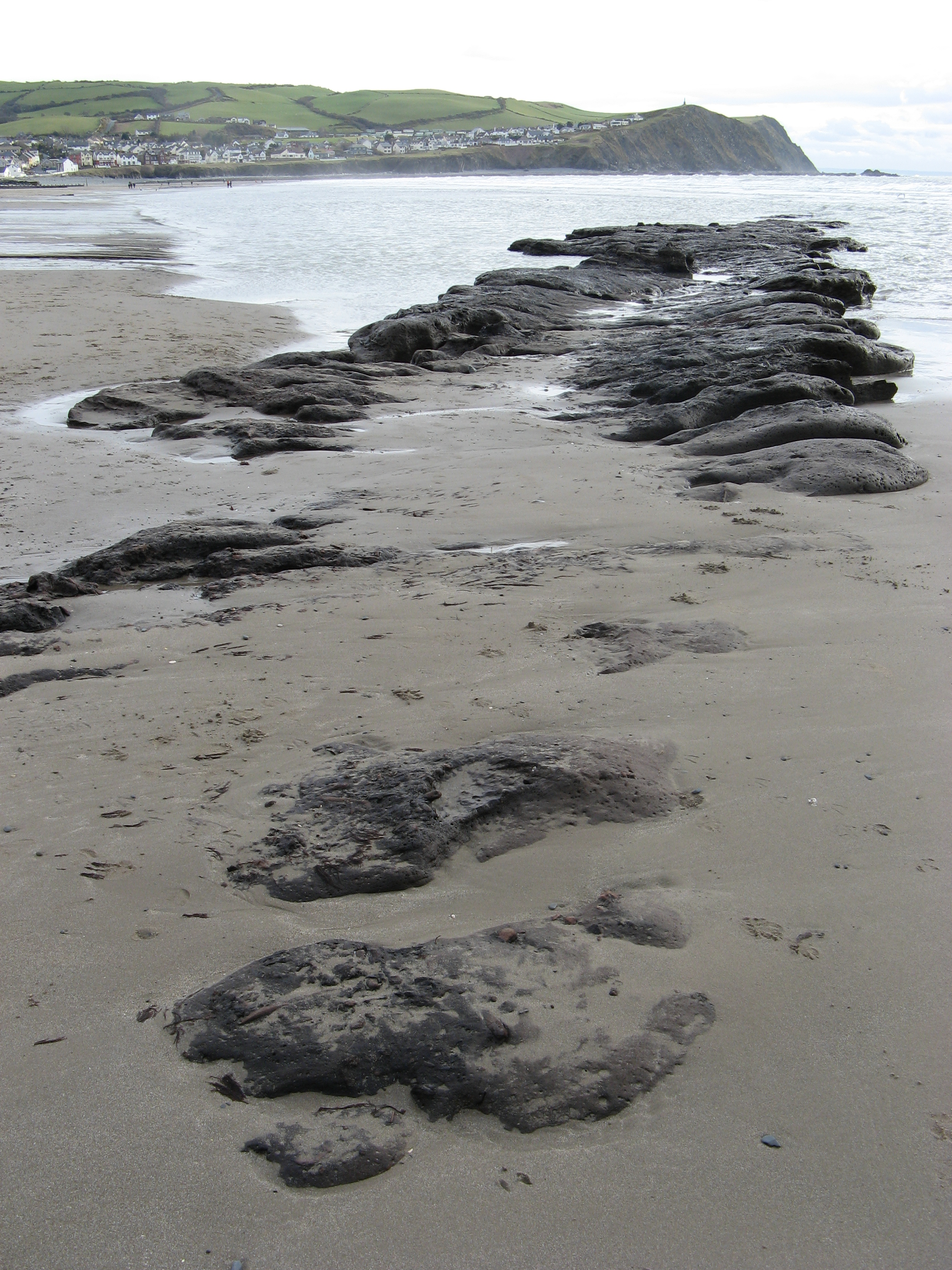
Submerged forest remains, March 2008

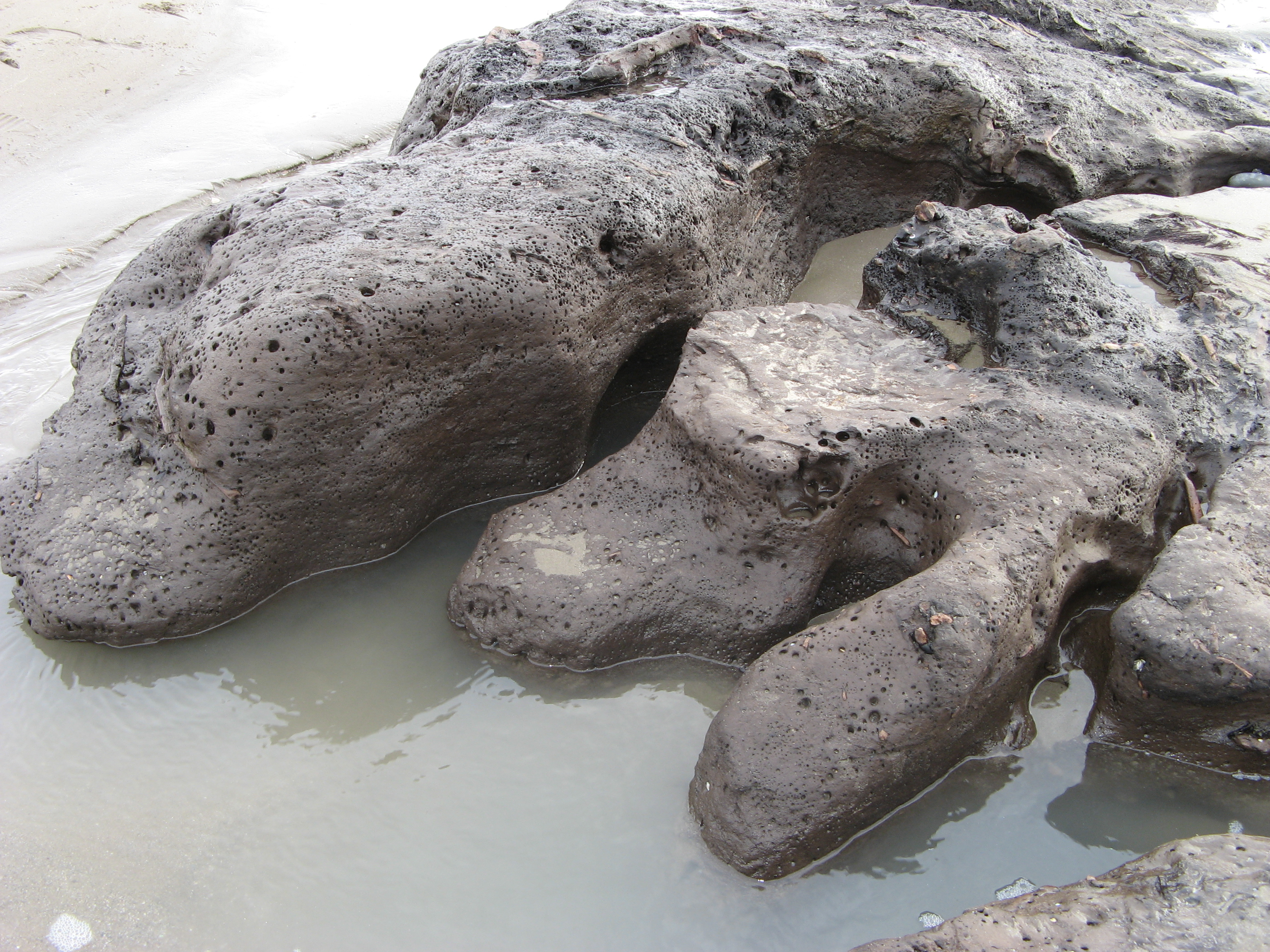
Submerged forest remains, details, March 2008

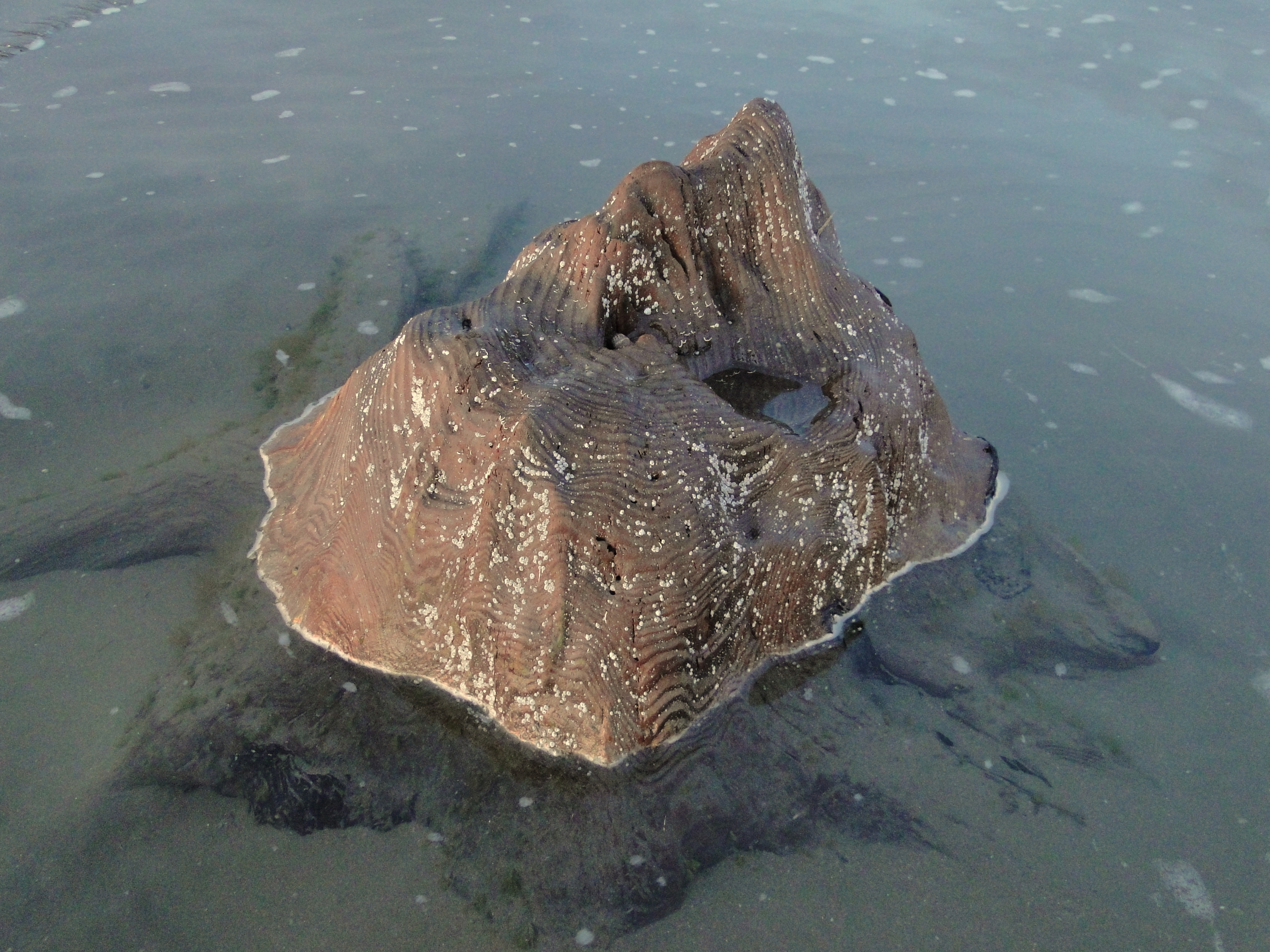
Preserved tree stump on Borth sands near Ynyslas

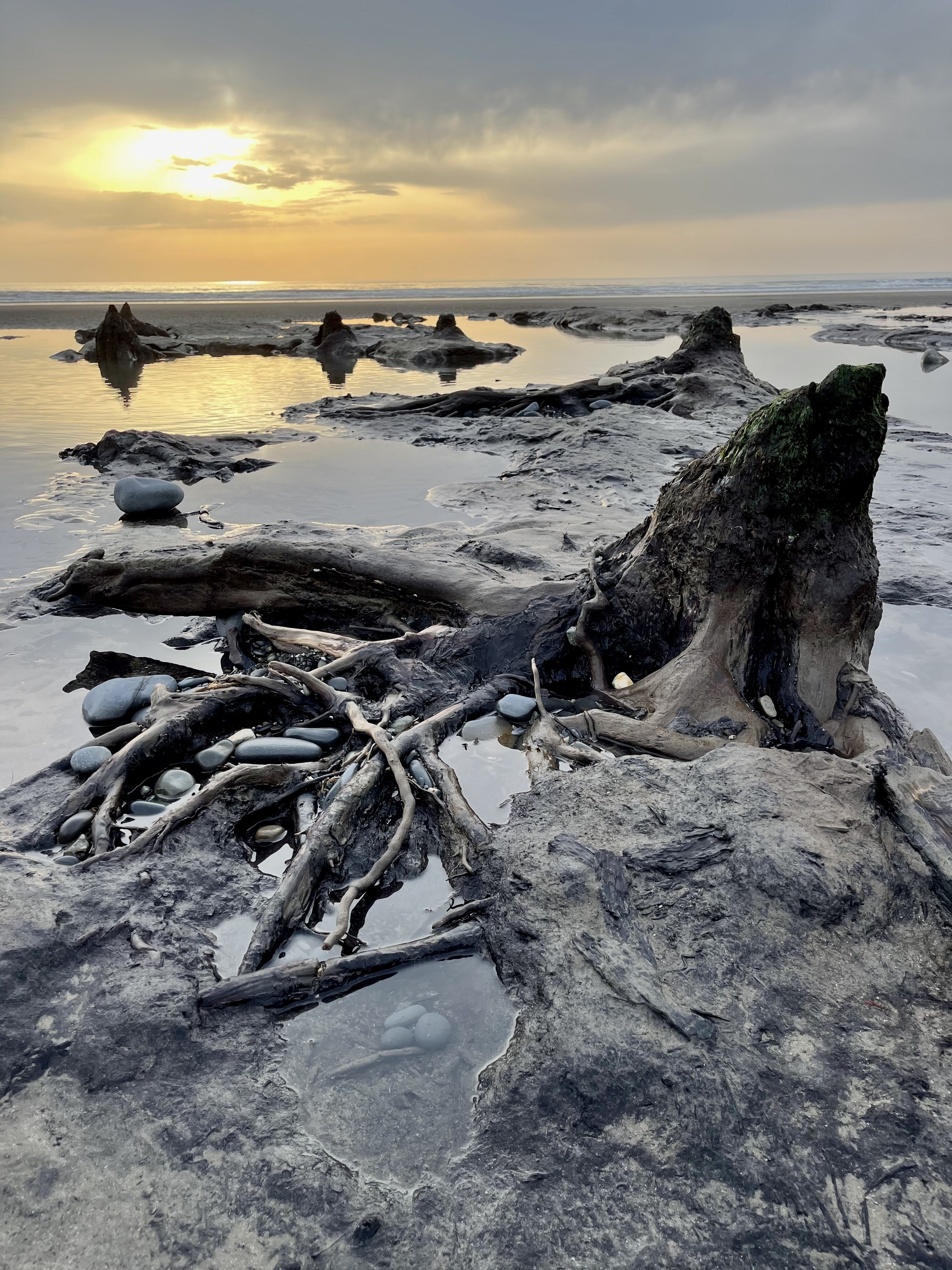
Remnants of the ancient forest seen on Borth Beach at low tide

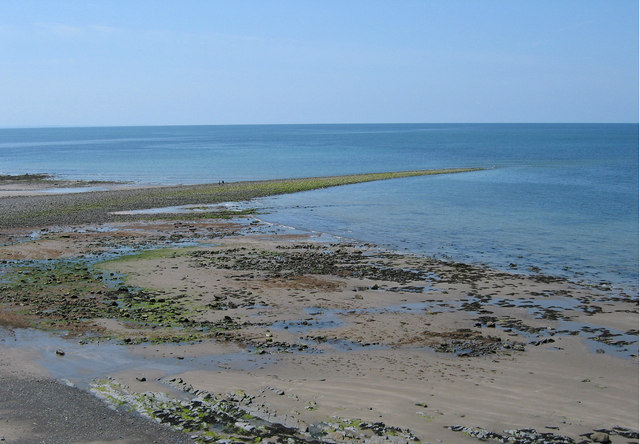
Sarn Gynfelyn revealed by low tide

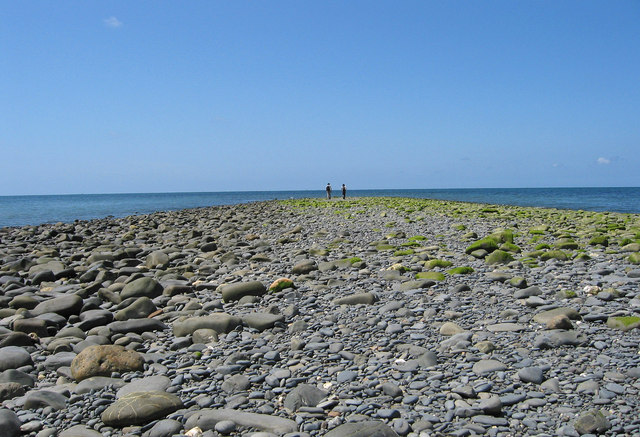
The end of Sarn Gynfelyn

== Origins of the myth ==
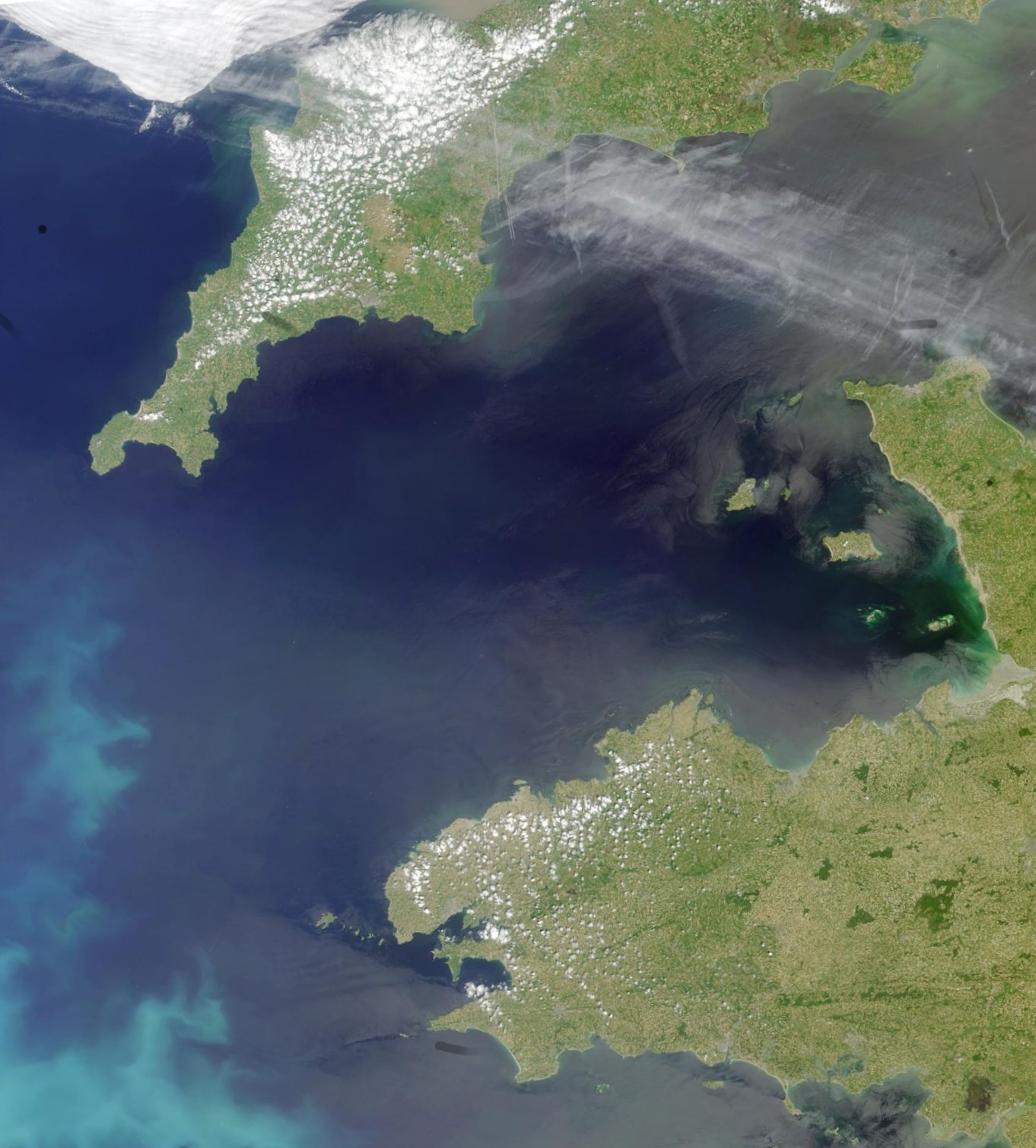
Comparable Celtic myths describe a submerged kingdom near Brittany or Cornwall

The myth, like so many others, may be a folk memory of gradually rising sea levels at the end of the ice age. The physical remains of the preserved sunken forest at Borth, and of Sarn Badrig nearby, could have suggested that some great tragedy had overcome a community there long ago and so the myth may have grown from that.

=== Analogies in other legends ===
The legend of Cantre'r Gwaelod is comparable to the deluge myth found in nearly every ancient culture and it has been likened to the story of Atlantis.

Several similar legends exist in Celtic mythology which refer to a lost land beneath the waves. Both the Breton legend of Ker-Ys and the Arthurian tale of Lyonesse refer to a kingdom submerged somewhere in the Celtic Sea, off the coast of Brittany or Cornwall respectively. In December 2025 a large stone wall, dating from 5000BC, 120m long and 3,300 tonnes was found submerged off the Brittany coast to support the Brittany legends.

== Cultural references ==
=== Literature ===
The legend has inspired many poems and songs throughout the ages. The earliest mention of Cantre'r Gwaelod is thought to be in the thirteenth-century Black Book of Carmarthen in a poem called Boddi Maes Gwyddno (English: The Drowning of the Land of Gwyddno) which relates the tale of Mererid and the well.

The story inspired a Victorian era-novel, The Misfortunes of Elphin (1829), by Thomas Love Peacock. At the 1925 National Eisteddfod of Wales, held in Pwllheli, Dewi Morgan ('Dewi Teifi') won the Bardic Chair with his Awdl recounting the legend, adopting Thomas Love Peacock's version as the basis for his poetic rendition.

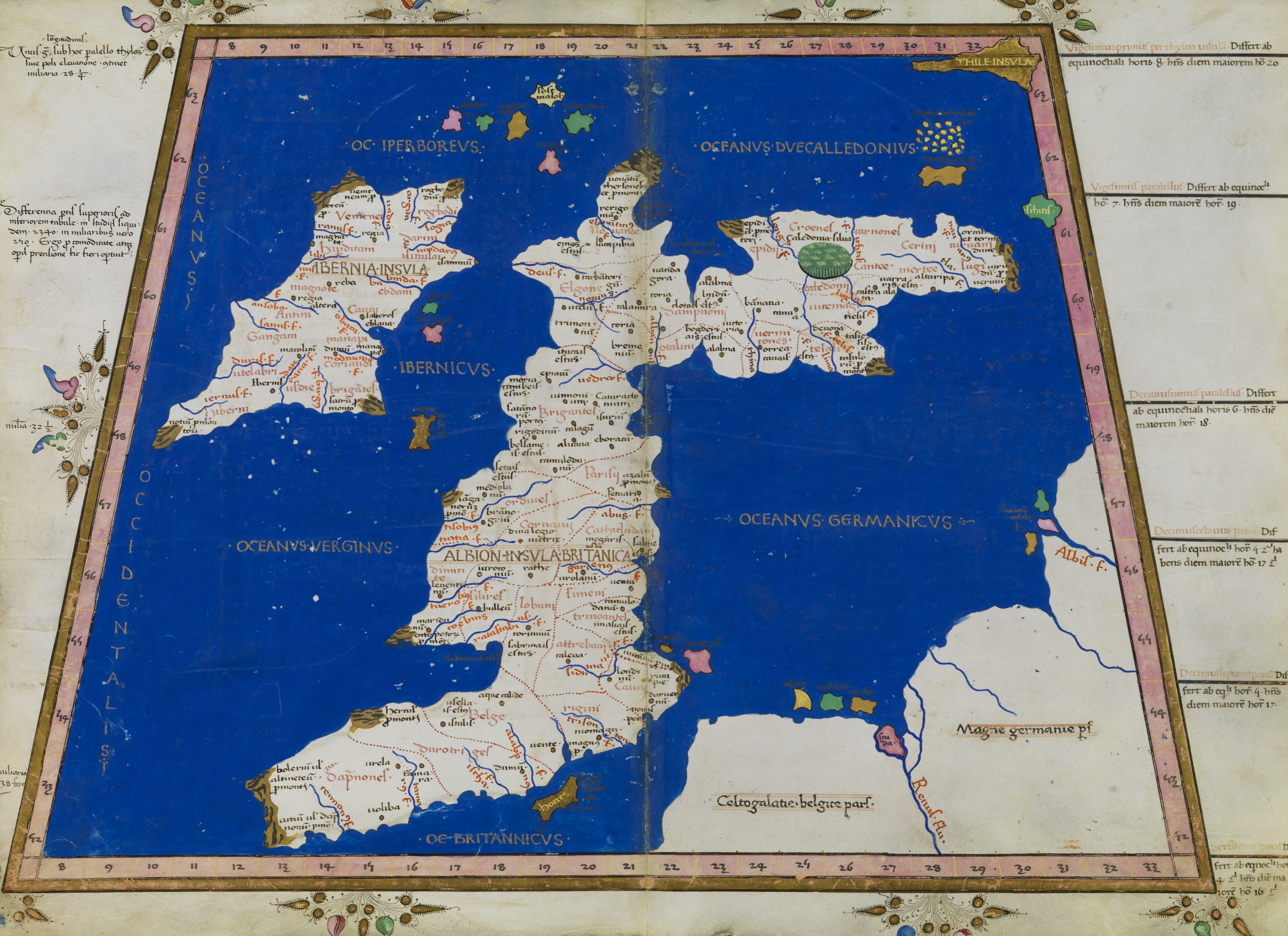
Ptolemy's map of Great Britain and Ireland (1467 copy)

Geologist William Ashton's 1920 book, The Evolution of a Coast-Line, Barrow to Aberystwyth and the Isle of Man, with Notes on Lost Towns, Submarine Discoveries, &C, discusses the legend and takes Ptolemy's map as evidence of the existence of an area of lost land in Cardigan Bay. Ashton also includes a conjectural map of Cantre'r Gwaelod within the bay.

Cantre'r Gwaelod is also featured in modern children's literature. Cantre'r Gwaelod is central to the setting of the 1977 Newbery Honor Book A String in the Harp by Nancy Bond. The kingdom also plays a major role in Silver on the Tree, the last book of The Dark Is Rising by Susan Cooper, parts of which are set in Aberdyfi. Siân Lewis and Jackie Morris's book Cities in the Sea (2002) retells the legend for children, and Welsh musician Cerys Matthews's first children's book Tales from the Deep (2011) features a story, The Ghost Bells of the Lowlands, which was adapted from the legend of Cantre'r Gwaelod.

Ava Reid's book A Study in Drowning features themes from this legend, the chiming of the bells under the water, the Welsh folklore and the there is even a place called the lowland hundred featured in the book.

=== Music and art ===
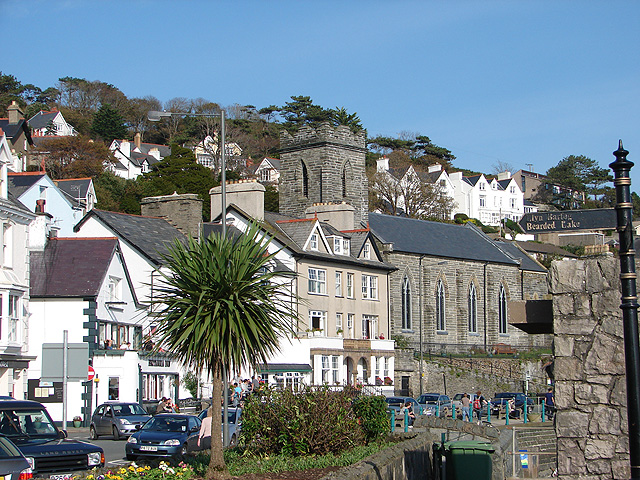
The bells of St Peter's, Aberdyfi can play Clychau Aberdyfi

The folk song Clychau Aberdyfi ("The Bells of Aberdovey"), popularised in the 18th century, relates to the part of the legend about the bells being heard ringing beneath the waves in the town of Aberdyfi. This song inspired cultural projects in the town involving bells; a new chime of bells was installed in September 1936 in the tower St Peter's Church, Aberdyfi, specifically designed to allow the playing of The Bells of Aberdovey. An art installation by the sculptor Marcus Vergette, a bronze "Time and Tide Bell", was mounted beneath the jetty in Aberdyfi Harbour in July 2011 as a homage to the folk song. The bell is rung by the action of water at high tide.

The story of Cantre'r Gwaelod was the theme of the song entitled "Y Bobl" that competed in the final of Cân i Gymru 2021, which was written by Daniel Williams and performed by Lily Beau.

=== Television ===
An episode of the BBC CBeebies programme Telly Tales, first broadcast in 2009, featured a children's re-enactment of the legend of Cantre'r Gwaelod through a mixture of animation and live action.

Cantre'r Gwaelod featured in the BBC documentary series Coast. Presenter Neil Oliver visited the sands of Aberdyfi and Ynyslas, near Borth, and examined the remains of the submerged forest and Sarn Badrig which are revealed at low tide, assisted by local historians and dendrochronologists.

== See also ==
- Llys Helig
- Lake-burst (Ireland)
