= Braich-y-Dinas =

Hillfort in Penmaenmawr, Conwy, Wales

- Penmaenmawr, North Wales
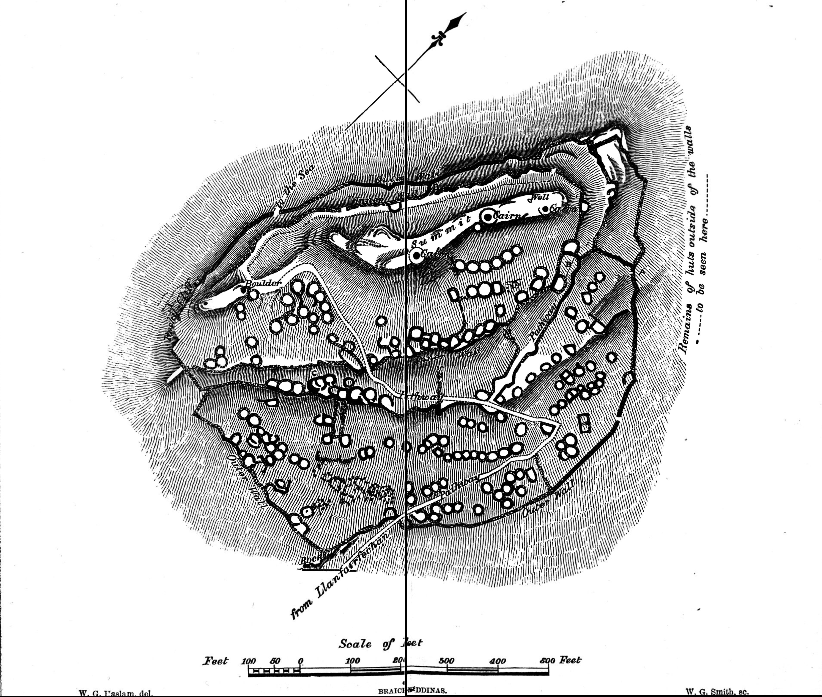
- Braich-y-Dinas

Site information
- Type: Hillfort
- Condition: Destroyed

Location
- The former site of Braich-y-Dinas shown within Conwy
- Location within Conwy
- Coordinates: 53.260721°N 3.9488339°W
- Grid reference: grid reference SH701755

Site history
- Materials: Stone

Airfield information
- Elevation: 351 m (1,152 ft) AMSL

Braich-y-Dinas was an extensive hillfort at the summit of Penmaenmawr, one of the northernmost peaks of the Carneddau mountain range on North coast of Wales. It was once considered the best preserved and most complete hillfort in North-West Wales, but completely disappeared in the first half of the 20th century due to a massive quarrying effort by the Darbishire family, which overwhelmed and eventually destroyed all traces of it, despite efforts by the Royal Commission to save the site.

== Eyewitness description of the hillfort ==
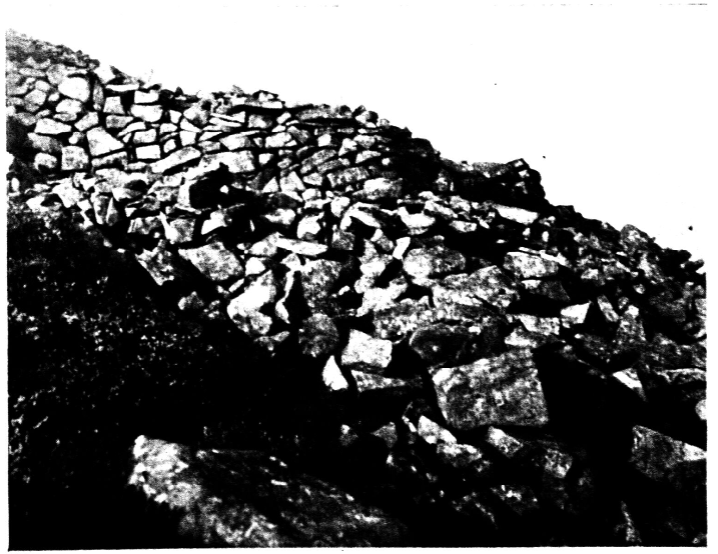
1909 photo of wall at Braich-y-Dinas, by H. Picton and W. Bezant Lowe

One of the earliest written accounts of the fort comes from Thomas Pennant, who visited the site as part of his 'A Tour in Wales' series (1778–1783). He gives the original height of the mountain as 1545 feet and noted its excellent preservation. The hilltop was defended by massive ramparts of roughly coursed rubble masonry, with no orthostats. By the mid 19th Century these still stood in places to a height of 9 ft., and varied from 8 to 15 ft. in thickness. The number and character of the entrances were uncertain. The interior contained 90 or more huts of various shapes but mostly oval with a usual diameter of 10–20 ft. Their walls were of similar construction to the rampart, about 5 or 6 ft. thick, and stood in places to a height of 4 ft. Summit top cairns were noted by another 18th Century antiquarian – Governor Thomas Pownall – (writing in 1771), and indeed three are included on the detailed 1877 plan (see image in infobox). These are speculated to have been early Bronze Age, which would date organised human activity on the site to at least c. 2000-2500 BC. The wider area is well known for its Neolithic activity, and indeed the Neolithic Axe factory of Graig Lwyd – one of the largest in Wales – can be found nestled at the Southeast corner.

All datable objects were originally assigned to the period AD 100–400, and no evidence was found to indicate more than one period of construction, but T. Driver of the RCAHMW speculates that this conclusion is almost certainly incorrect; noting that the surviving plans of the fort suggest several periods of construction. The evidence of the relics suggests that the most prosperous inhabitants of the fort were those living between the outer and middle ramparts, as all the Samian pottery, and four of the six coins found, came from this part of the fort. The site produced saddle querns, but none of the rotary type'.

An eyewitness account of the site from Archaeologia Cambrensis correspondent H. Longueville Jones; details the hillfort as seen in 1845, as follows:

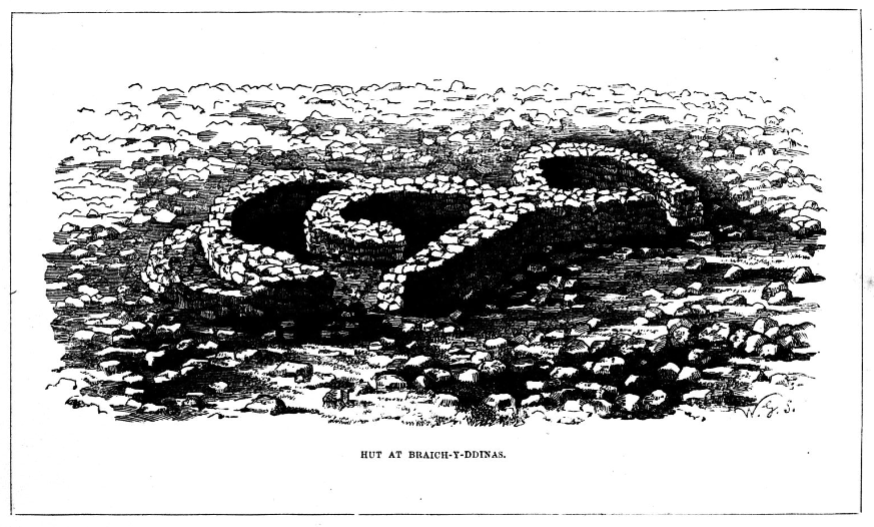
1877 Illustration of a hut, at Braich-y-Dinas

"Upon reaching the fortified British post of Braich y Dinas, on the summit of Penmaen Mawr, we found the circuits of stone walls still perfect in some parts, but greatly dilapidated in others. They are about 12 to 15 feet height, and about 12 feet thick; of loose stones, not fitting into each other with any attempt at masonry, but merely the shattered debris of that rough mountain piled together by human art. There is no appearance of mortar, nor of vitrification. Between the walls, and inside the central inclosure, but especially on the north eastern side of the summit, are a vast number of small circular cells, or cyttiau, which no doubt served for the habitations of the persons occupying this fortified post, and similar to those so common on the Caernarvonshire hills. Some of them were singularly perfect, and one, near the present north western entrance to the fortress, is still covered with its roof, but we could not penetrate within, and we did not feel ourselves justified in attempting to remove the stones."

== Finds from the site ==
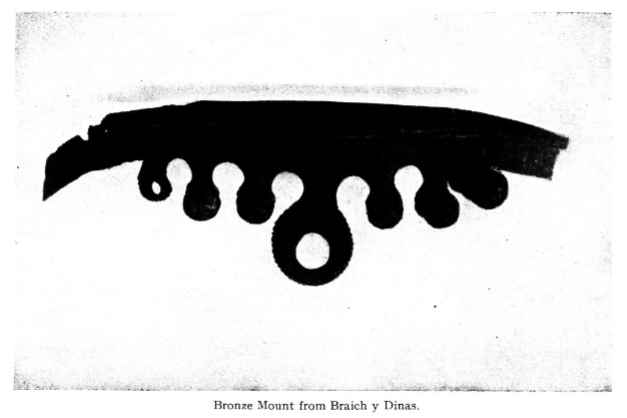
Photograph of the bronze mount found at Braich-y-Dinas.

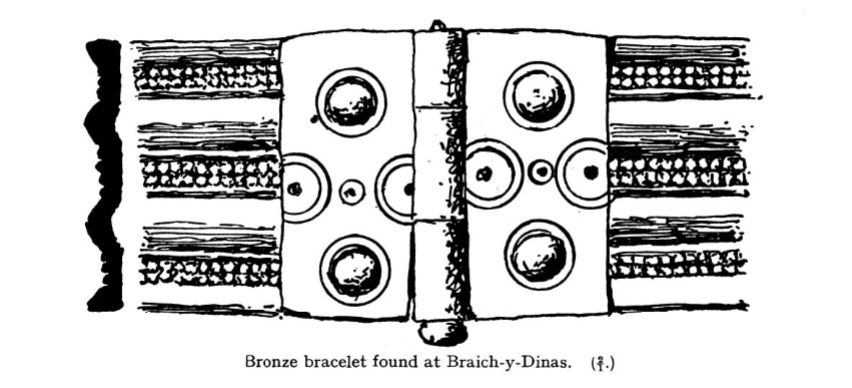
Bronze bracelet found at Braich-y-Dinas.

Notable finds from the site include a bronze mount (pictured), which Harold Hughes, writing for Archaeologia Cambrensis, speculated belonged to a handled tankard; based on other, similar pieces from the wider area. Hughes also describes two matching bronze bracelets, ornamented with concentric circles, a design, he conjectured, would have been derived from Celtic, rather than Roman inspiration. Datable finds from the fort include a Middle Bronze Age looped spearhead, Roman coins featuring the Emperors Nerva (reigned 96 AD – 98 AD), Trajan (reigned 98 AD – 117 AD) and Hadrian (reigned 117 AD – 138 AD); as well as numerous pottery fragments, most from late 1st and early 2nd Century AD, with some fewer appearing from as late as the 3rd and 4th Centuries AD. Also found at the site was a large saddle quern, and a sandstone spindle whorl.

== Efforts to save the site ==
On 10 August 1908, a Royal Commission was authorised and appointed by King Edward VII to 'make an inventory of the Ancient and Historical Monuments and Constructions connected with or illustrative of the contemporary culture, civilisation and conditions of life of the people in Wales and Monmouthshire from the earliest times, and to specify those which seem most worthy of preservation'. From 1909, the newly-founded commission made efforts to rescue the already partly-destroyed site from further harm caused by the extensive quarrying being undertaken by the Darbishire family. Several local newspaper articles from June 1909 attest to this, reporting that MP for Carmarthen District Llewelyn Williams raised the issue of Braich-y-Dinas (named as 'Pendinas') with the Prime Minister, only to be told that the 600 jobs sustained by the quarry took precedence over the prehistoric remains. Having failed in Parliament, attention was turned 'to the creation of a strong public opinion to bring pressure to bear upon the quarrying company concerned with a view of the preservation of the summit of a mountain at Penmaenmawr.' In 1910, an article about the destruction of Braich-y-Dinas appeared in British newspaper The Sphere, which was also picked up and reported across the Atlantic in The New York Times . Ultimately unsuccessful and faced with the imminent destruction of the site, members of the commission made several visits to the Braich-y-Dinas hillfort in order to preserve some written record of the remaining structures; and an extensive survey was undertaken by Harold Hughes for the Cambrian Archaeological Association.

== Destruction of Braich-y-Dinas ==
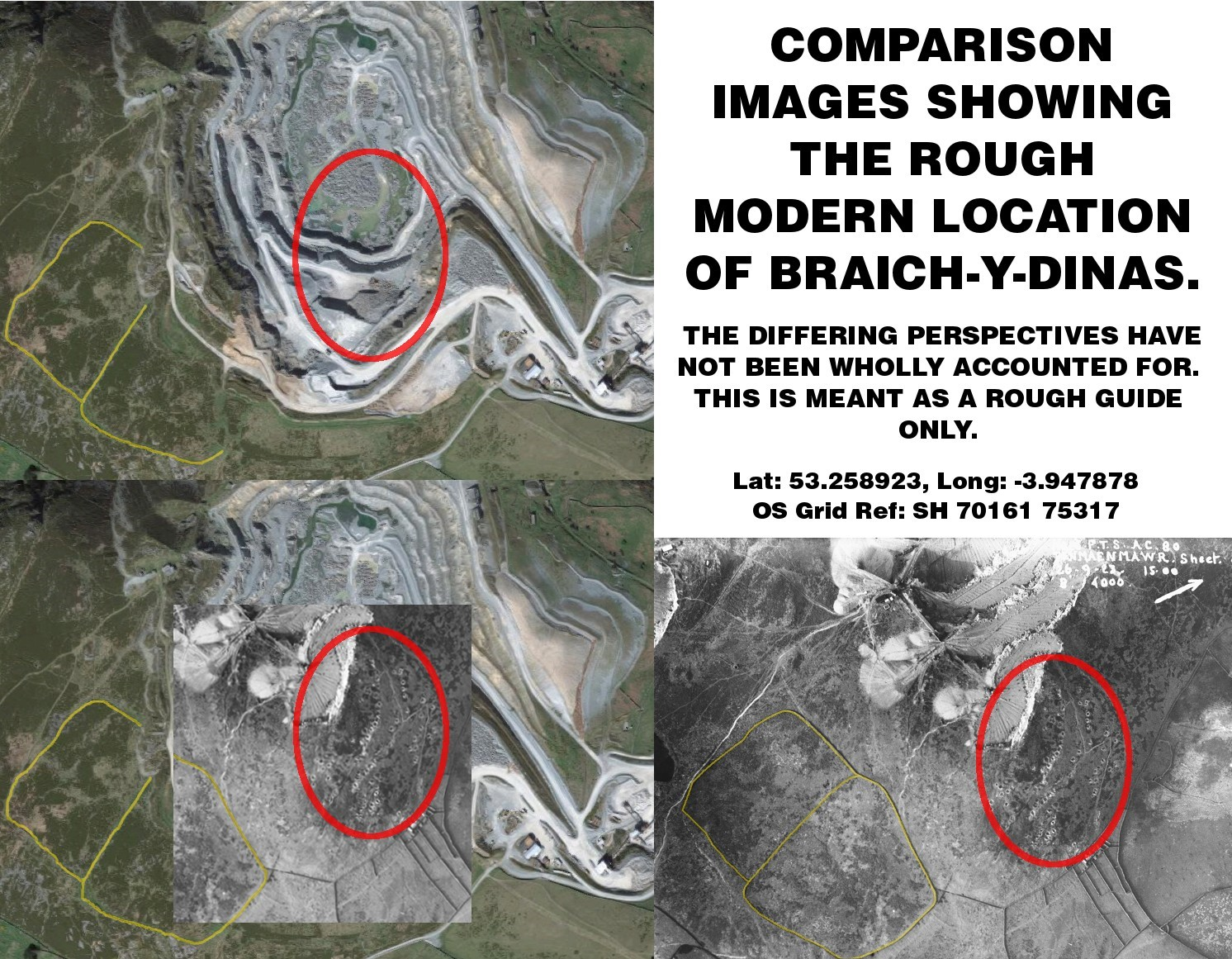
Comparison between 1923 aerial photograph of site, and modern day satellite imagery.

Evidence given before the Royal Commission on the Ancient and Historical Monuments of Wales in February 1912, confirmed that blasting work was currently under way on the crest of Penmaenmawr. Upon examination by the Commission, the Crown Receiver of His Majesty's Woods and Forests Department for Wales and Monmouthshire, Mr William Henry More confirmed that there was no provision in the lease – held and managed by Colonel C. H. Darbishire – for the preservation of the camp. He also argued that extending the quarry in any other direction than towards the camp would be 'impractical and impossible'; speaking from the financial point of view of the owner of the lease. The land in question was described as residing partly on 'Crown wasteland' and partly on 'land sold many years ago to Mr Darbishire, reserving minerals'. It emerged during questioning that surveys of the area from 1840 conducted by one Mr John Jones, failed to show any antiquarian remains at the site. There was some confusion as to the current extent of the damage to the site – indeed Mr More initially described the incursion of the quarry as "small"—but it was conceded upon further examination that because of recent expansion of operations at the blasting site, much of the remaining area must necessarily have already been destroyed. Mr More later admitted to having misled the commission by claiming that only "a small part" of the site was contained within the current lease; when in fact the lease was actually provisioned for an area containing the "whole of the camp." When asked whether it was within the remit of the Department of Woods and Forests to collect information 'respecting the history' of the properties in its charge; Mr More answered that the department had always been run 'to the advantage of the public revenue.' Somewhat contradicting this confused testimony, an RAF aerial photograph taken eleven years later in 1923 appears to show much of the camp still intact; with the shapes of over 50 huts still visible on the mountainside (see comparison image); and indeed finds were still being recorded from the site up until 1934, at the earliest.

== Modern day ==
Nothing at all remains of the hillfort at Braich-y-Dinas.

== See also ==
- Royal Commission on the Ancient and Historical Monuments of Wales
