= Llys Helig =

Natural rock formation in north Wales

Llys Helig is a natural rock formation off the coast at Penmaenmawr, north Wales. There may be a fish weir to the south which tradition dates to the beginning of the 6th century. The sea level was low enough around 1600 AD to make the claims of Sir John Wynne of Gwydir feasible. The earliest known use of the name Llys Helig for this rock formation is the Halliwell Manuscript which is believed to date to around the beginning of the 17th century, eleven centuries later. Legends developed about it suggesting that it was the palace of Prince Helig ap Glanawg (also spelled Glannog) who lived in the 6th century, and whose sons established a number of churches in the area. He owned a large area of land between the Great Orme's Head near Llandudno and the Menai Strait off the north coast of Gwynedd.

This area was inundated by the sea, which gave rise to the legend of the drowned kingdom.

Llys Helig is mentioned in a number of old documents, some of which were published after expeditions to find the Palace. These include -

An Ancient Survey of Pen Maen Mawr, 1625 - 1649, by John Gwynn
The Map of Wales, 1788, by W.Owen
Tours of Wales, 1804, by Fenton
Cambria Depicta, 1812, by Pugh
Baner ac Amserau Cymru, 1864, Richard Parry & Charlton Halls, a Paper to the Liverpool Geological Society

This last expedition reported finds of the remains of seaweed-covered walls, these walls indicating buildings some 100 yards long, and they concluded that this was indeed the palace.

== Llys Helig and the tale of Cantre'r Gwaelod ==
Rachel Bromwich discusses what she refers to as the folk-tale of Cantre'r Gwaelod, another alleged sunken kingdom but in Cardiganshire. As with Llys Helig, there are tales of remains being seen of the sunken kingdom. Bromwich believes that the two stories influenced each other, and that "The widespread parallels to this inundation theme would suggest that the two stories are in fact one in origin, and were localized separately in Cardiganshire and in the Conwy estuary, around two traditional figures of the sixth century. She also notes that the Halliwell Manuscript gives Helig the title "Lord of Cantre'r Gwaelod". In the book New Directions In Celtic Studies Antone Minard wrote that "The Welsh legends of Cantre'r Gwaelod and Llys Helig (Helig's Court) contain the same details of audible bells beneath the waves and ruins which are visible at the equinoctial tides, which are the anchors of credulity in the story".
