= Penmaenmawr =

Town and community in Conwy, Wales

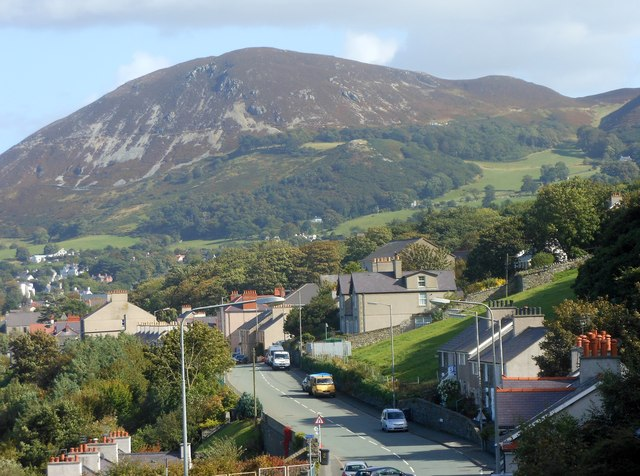
- Foel Lûs towers above Penmaenmawr

- Location within Conwy
- Population: 4,353 (2011)
- OS grid reference: SH714765
- Community: Penmaenmawr
- Principal area: Conwy
- Preserved county: Clwyd
- Country: Wales
- Sovereign state: United Kingdom
- Post town: PENMAENMAWR
- Postcode district: LL34
- Dialling code: 01492
- Police: North Wales
- Fire: North Wales
- Ambulance: Welsh
- UK Parliament: Bangor Aberconwy
- Senedd Cymru – Welsh Parliament: Bangor Conwy Môn
- List of places UK Wales Conwy 53.270°N 3.928°W Map of the community

Penmaenmawr (/ˈpɛnmaɪnˌmaʊər/, Welsh: [ˈpɛnmaːɨnmaur]) is a town and community in Conwy County Borough, Wales, which was formerly in the parish of Dwygyfylchi and the traditional county of Caernarfonshire. It is on the North Wales coast between Conwy and Llanfairfechan and was an important quarrying town, though quarrying is no longer a major employer. The population of the community was 4,353 in 2011, including Dwygyfylchi and Capelulo. The town itself having a population of 2,868 (2011).

It was named after Penmaenmawr mountain, which stands above the sea immediately west of the town. Much of its formerly rounded top (with an old hill-fort) has been quarried away, leaving the present-day lower flat top.

The town was bypassed by the A55 Expressway in the 1980s, losing its old Edwardian period promenade in the process, which was largely replaced by a modern one. Penmaenmawr is noted for its spectacular mountain and coastal walks. Nearby are the popular attractions of Sychnant Pass and Conwy Mountain, and the town also lies partly within Snowdonia National Park (Eryri).

== Etymology ==
The name Penmaenmawr is the Welsh for "Head of the Great Stone", or "Great Headland of Stone" contrasting with Penmaenbach; Pen meaning "head", maen meaning "stone" and mawr meaning "large".

== Geography ==
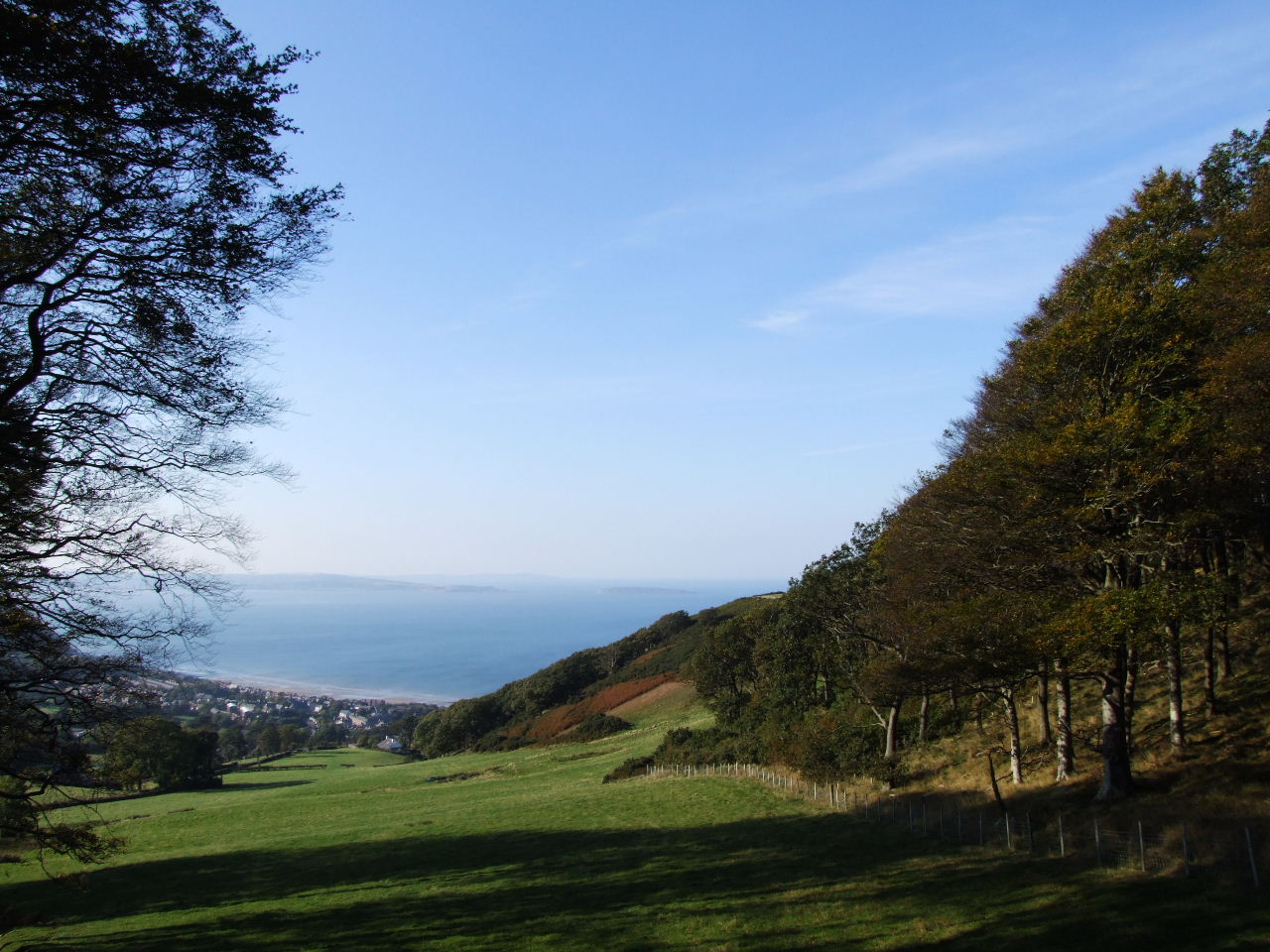
View of western half of Penmaenmawr from Gwddw Glas ("green gorge")

The villages that make up Penmaenmawr are Penmaenan and Pant Yr Afon on the west and Dwygyfylchi and Capelulo on the east. They are on a small coastal plain about 2 miles (3.2 km) long and half a mile deep facing Conwy Bay and the Irish Sea to the north. The bay is sheltered by the south-east tip of Anglesey and Puffin Island to the north-west and the limestone headland of Pen-y-Gogarth (the Great Orme) to the north-east. The sea is shallow here between Traeth Lafan and the Conwy estuary. The beach is extensive, consisting of smooth pebbles and a wide expanse of sand; it was awarded a Blue Flag for five years running.

Two headlands separate Penmaenmawr from its neighbours. In the west, the bulk of Penmaen Mawr lies between the town neighbouring Llanfairfechan and the wider coastal plain extending to Bangor. To the east, the smaller but no less rugged headland of Penmaen Bach divides Dwygyfylchi from Conwy Morfa.

Penmaenbach is the most northerly tip of the Snowdonia National Park, which covers a large part of Dwygyfylchi and Capelulo. To the south an arc of hills and uplands extends east to west from Capelulo to Penmaen Mawr, beginning with Yr Allt Wen above Dwygyfylchi, Sychnant Pass (the old road crosses this pass to Conwy) and Pen-sychnant at Capelulo. The rounded hill of Foel Lys, Gwddw Glas (Green Gorge), Bryn Derwydd and the head of Cwm Graiglwyd and finally Penmaenmawr. Foel Lus rises to 362 metres (1,188 ft).

The coastal plain is nearly divided by Trwyn-yr-Wylfa, which also marks the boundary between Pant-yr-afon and Penmaenan in the west and the Hen Bentra or "Old Village" of Dwygyfylchi and Capelulo in the east. Two small rivers flow through the area. The first, Afon Pabwyr, runs down from wooded Cwm Graiglwyd then under the town centre, Pant-yr-afon, to the beach; the second and larger, Afon Gyrrach, runs for about 4 miles (6.4 km) from the northern slopes of Tal-y-Fan to the sea near Penmaenbach, passing through Nant Ddaear-y-llwynog (The Fairy Glen) and the old villages of Dwygyfylchi and Capelulo.

== History ==
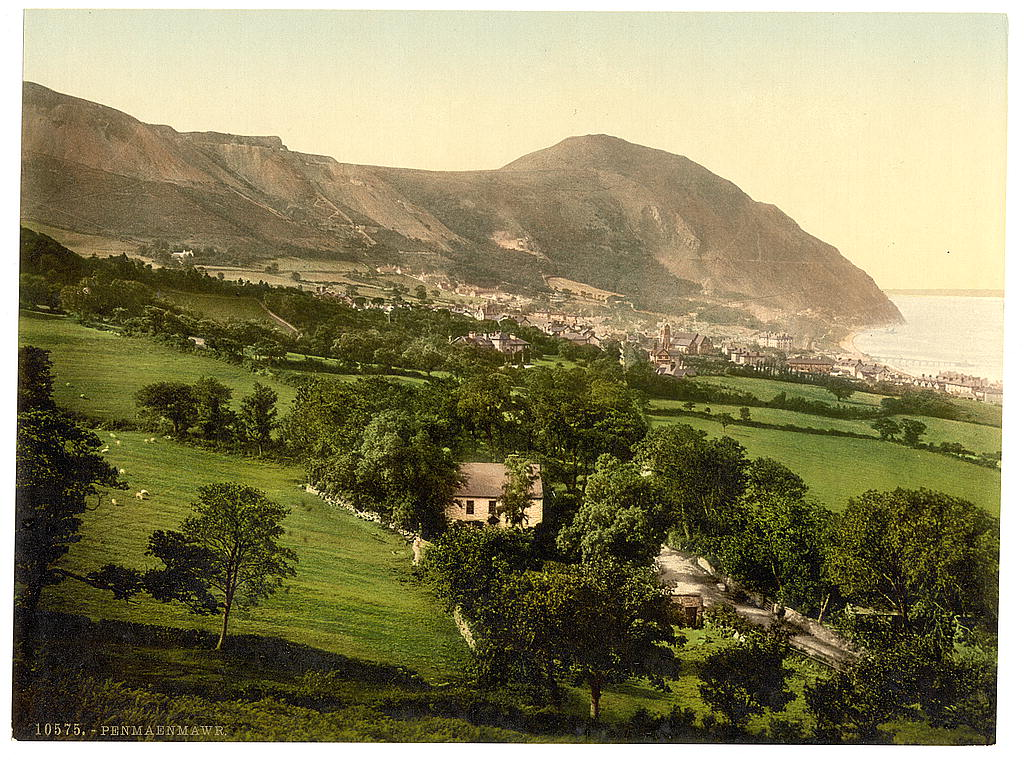
Penmaenmawr, ca. 1890–1900

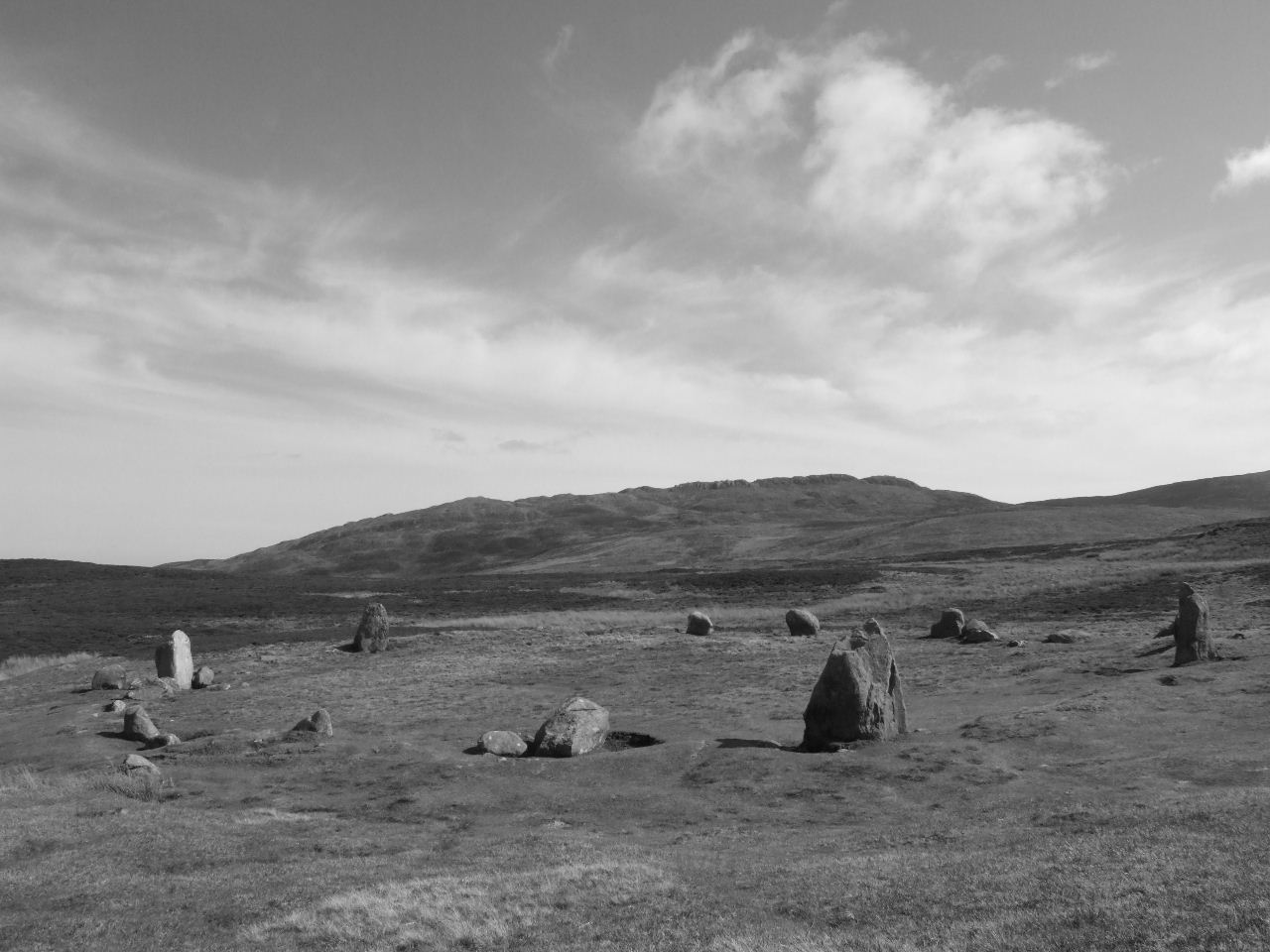
The Meini Hirion or Druid's Circle, with Tal-y-Fan in the background

=== Prehistory ===
The uplands above the town have many prehistoric remains, including the site of prehistoric polished stone axe factories on the west slopes of Cwm Graiglwyd near the top of Penmaen-mawr. This was once one of the most important stone axe manufacturing sites in Europe, together with the Langdale axe industry in the Lake District, Tievebulliagh in County Antrim and other sites across Britain.

There is evidence that axes from Graiglwyd were exported widely 5,000 years ago, examples having been found as far afield as Cornwall and south-east England. The nearby Meini Hirion, known in English as Druid's Circle, is a prehistoric stone circle. Archaeological excavations have discovered the cremated remains of children at the site. A prehistoric trackway from Bwlch-y-ddeufaen to Conwy runs by the circle. The summit of Penmaen-mawr, from which the town takes its name, was 1,500 feet (460 m) above sea level until reduced by modern quarrying. The summit area was crowned by Braich-y-Dinas, one of the largest Iron Age hillforts in Europe, comparable with Tre'r Ceiri near Trefor on the Llŷn peninsula. However, nothing remains today; the last remnants were obliterated by quarrying in the 1920s.

=== Medieval and early modern periods ===
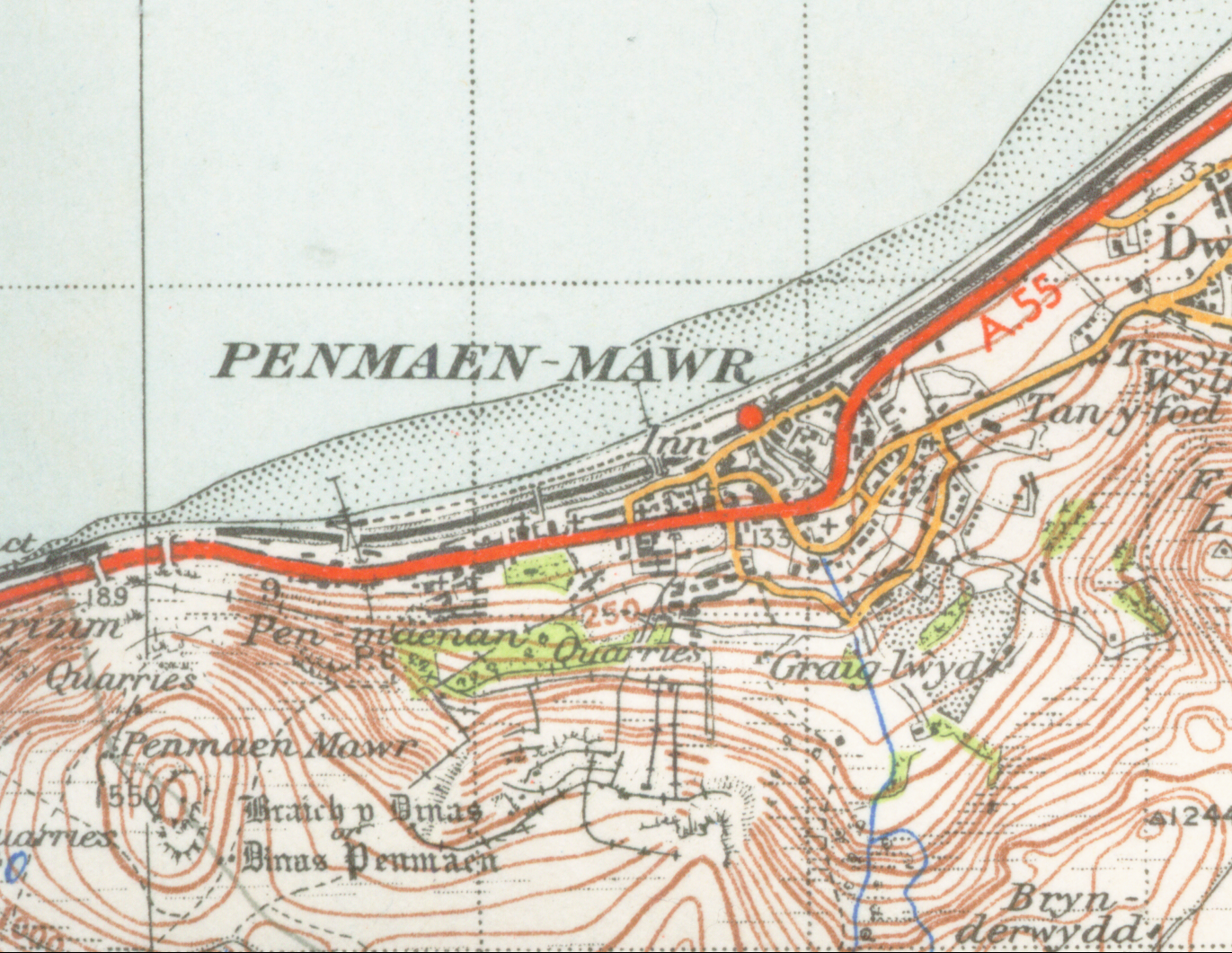
A map of Penmaenmawr from 1947

According to tradition, the 5th or 6th century saint Seiriol, after whom Ynys Seiriol, the Welsh name for Puffin Island or Priestholme, is named, had a hermit's cell in Cwm Graiglwyd. A declivity, Clipyn Seiriol, above the modern road tunnel through Penmaenmawr, also bears his name, as does the modern church of St Seiriol's near the town centre. The older church of St Gwynin's in Dwygyfylchi is the parish church today. Penmaenmawr is also associated with Saint Ulo, Capelulo being at the foot of Sychnant and reputedly the site of an early medieval chapel.

From the early Middle Ages onwards the parish has been part of Arllechwedd Uchaf, and this ancient Welsh cwmwd (English: commote), which together with neighbouring Arllechwedd Isaf makes up the cantref (hundred) of Arllechwedd, is still used by the church as an administrative unit today.

=== Quarrying town and seaside resort ===
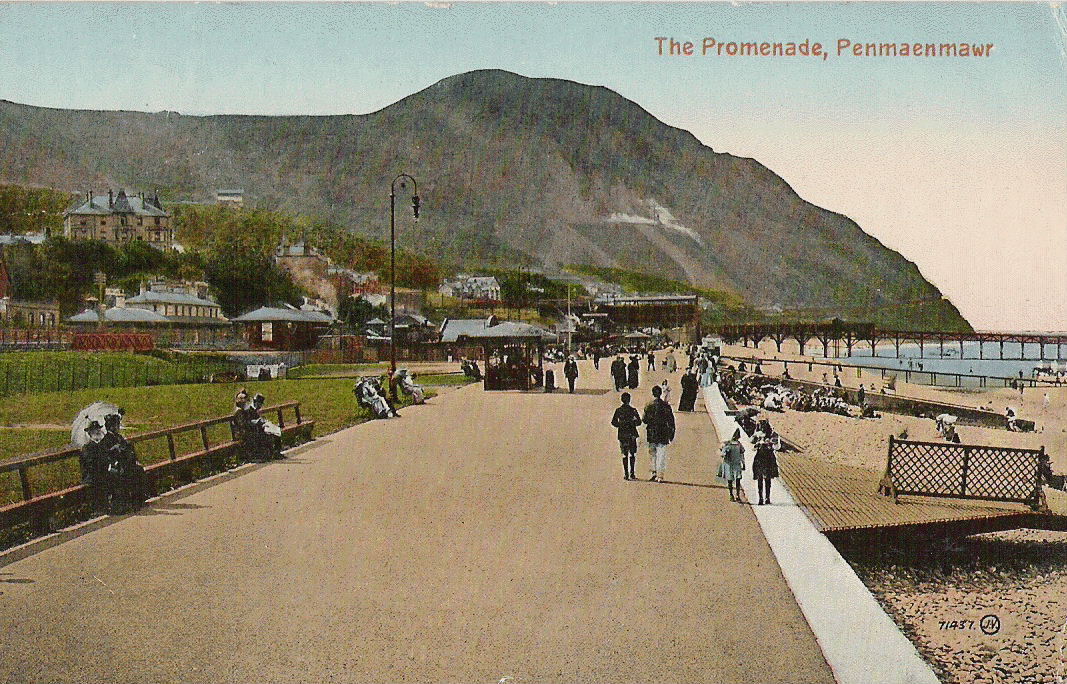
Penmaenmawr Promenade with the quarry jetties and Penmaen-mawr mountain, c. 1910, from an old postcard

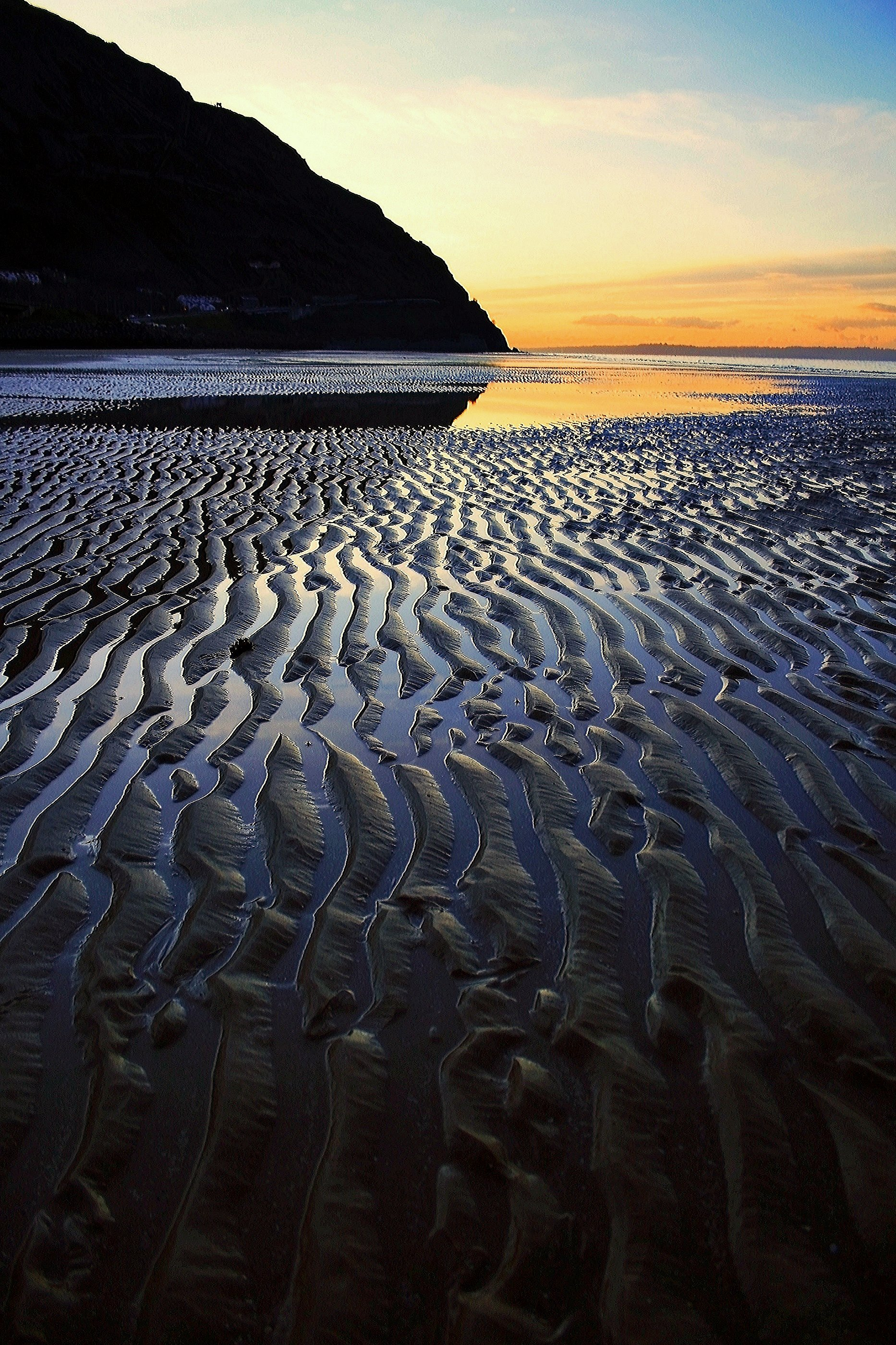
Penmaenmawr beach

The industrial quarrying of igneous rock (diorite) at Penmaenan began in 1830 with the opening of the Penmaen Quarry and the subsequent, competing Graiglwyd and "Old" quarries which were amalgamated by 1888 under Colonel Darbishire. Most of the production in these early years was of setts and paving, but from 1881 the advantage of crushed rock for railway ballast was demonstrated and new crushing mills were built to provide for that market. In 1911 Darbishire merged these operations with the quarries of Trefor to form the Penmaenmawr & Welsh Granite Co. As the industry grew, workers and their families flocked to Penmaenmawr from all over north-west Wales and beyond. The link was especially strong with Trefor, the home of Trefor granite quarry on the slopes of Yr Eifl. The community which sprang up in the present-day wards of Penmaenan and Pant-yr-afon was close-knit and almost entirely Welsh-speaking. By the early years of the 20th century about 1,000 men worked in the quarry and its associated workshops. Neighbouring Llanfairfechan was an integral part of this process.

The quarried stone was lowered by self-acting inclines to the 3-foot (910 mm) gauge tramway which ran to jetties from where the setts were loaded into ships. After 1848 the majority of the quarry output was sent by main-line rail, although the quarry and its internal narrow gauge railway continued to operate through the 19th century.

Life was not easy for the quarrymen, especially those who worked on the higher slopes. They were expected to walk up to the summit area in all weathers and faced losing pay if unable to reach the top. A strong spirit of camaraderie developed and was reflected in the town's chapels, pubs and cultural societies. Products were exported by rail to ports such as Liverpool and the cities of England and by sea from the two quarrying jetties to Liverpool and also to a number of European ports such as Hamburg. Ships continued to load cargoes from the Darbishire jetty until 1976, although sea trade had been sparse since the famous stranding of the Rethi Muller in 1967. Railway ballast continued to move in quantity from the sidings near the station, but all the original infrastructure was swept away by the building of the new A55 Expressway in the late 1980s. A new rail-loading facility was constructed and the original sidings space used for the new road. In 2008 the contract for the supply of railway ballast to Network Rail was lost, and since that time there have only been limited movements by rail – such as for construction of the Manchester Metrolink extensions. This quarrying over time removed the whole top of Penmaenmawr mountain, which was once much higher with a rounded top, with an old hill-fort.

The town grew in popularity as a seaside resort for the well-to-do in the second half of the 19th century, in part due to the enthusiasm shown by statesman and Prime Minister William Ewart Gladstone who holidayed eleven times in Penmaenmawr between 1855 and 1896. Since then the A55 has separated the seaside from the town and the population and tourism have declined.

== Governance ==
There are two tiers of local government covering Penmaenmawr, at community (town) level and principal area (county borough) level: Penmaenmawr Town Council (Cyngor Tref Penmaenmawr) and Conwy County Borough Council. The town council is based at the Community Centre on Conwy Road.

=== Administrative history ===
Penmaenmawr formed part of the ancient parish of Dwygyfylchi within the historic county of Caernarfonshire. In 1866 the parish was made a local government district, administered by an elected local board. In 1890, the district's name was changed from Dwygyfylchi to Penmaenmawr.

Such local government districts were reconstituted as urban districts under the Local Government Act 1894. Penmaenmawr Urban District was abolished in 1974, with its area becoming a community in the Aberconwy borough of the new county of Gwynedd. Further reforms in 1996 abolished the boroughs and counties created in 1974, and Penmaenmawr was placed in the new Conwy County Borough. For the ceremonial purposes of lieutenancy and shrievalty, Penmaenmawr remained in the preserved county of Gwynedd until 2003, when the whole of Conwy County Borough was placed in the preserved county of Clwyd.

== Education ==
Ysgol Pencae provides Welsh-medium primary education to the village and the surrounding area. As of 2025, there were 155 pupils enrolled at the school. A third of pupils speak Welsh at home.

== Notable events ==
In August 1923 Rudolf Steiner presented the first International Summer School on Anthroposophy at Penmaenmawr. Steiner made several excursions to the Druid’s Circle (Meini Hirion) during his fortnight of lectures at Penmaenmawr. The day after the Summer School he travelled to London where the Anthroposophical Society in Great Britain was founded (on 2 September 1923).

On 27 August 1950 the 1:45 am up-express passenger train from Holyhead to Euston, the Irish Mail, was approaching Penmaenmawr station at 60–70 mph after passing a distant signal set to "clear". As the train approached the home signal it was suddenly set to "danger". The driver shut off steam and applied the brake but was not able to prevent a collision at 45–50 mph with a light engine on the up line. Four passengers and a sleeping car attendant were killed outright and a fifth passenger died in hospital.

On 24 September 1976, Penmaenmawr was the scene of a mass murder, as former submarine commander Neil Rutherford killed four people at the Red Gables hotel, then set the hotel on fire and shot himself.

== Amenities, clubs and societies ==
- Amgueddfa (Penmaenmawr Museum) – an independent museum based at the Old Post Office, Pant yr Afon
- Clwb Golff (Penmaenmawr Golf Club) – a 9-hole course on Hen Ffordd Conwy in Dwygyfylchi, one of the most scenic in north Wales
- Eden Hall – small historic gardens near the town centre
- Clwb Snwcer (Penmaenmawr Snooker Club) – within the Community Centre on Ffordd Conwy
- Penmaenmawr Sailing Club – on Penmaenmawr Promenade
- Penmaenmawr Bowling Club – opposite the promenade entrance near the railway station
- Penmaenmawr Phoenix F.C. – the town's football team, composed mainly of local players
- Pen Sychnant Nature Reserve – a conservation area of 12 acres (49,000 m^{2}) with mature shrubs and woodland, at the top of the Sychnant Pass, Dwygyfylchi.

== Transport ==
=== Bus ===
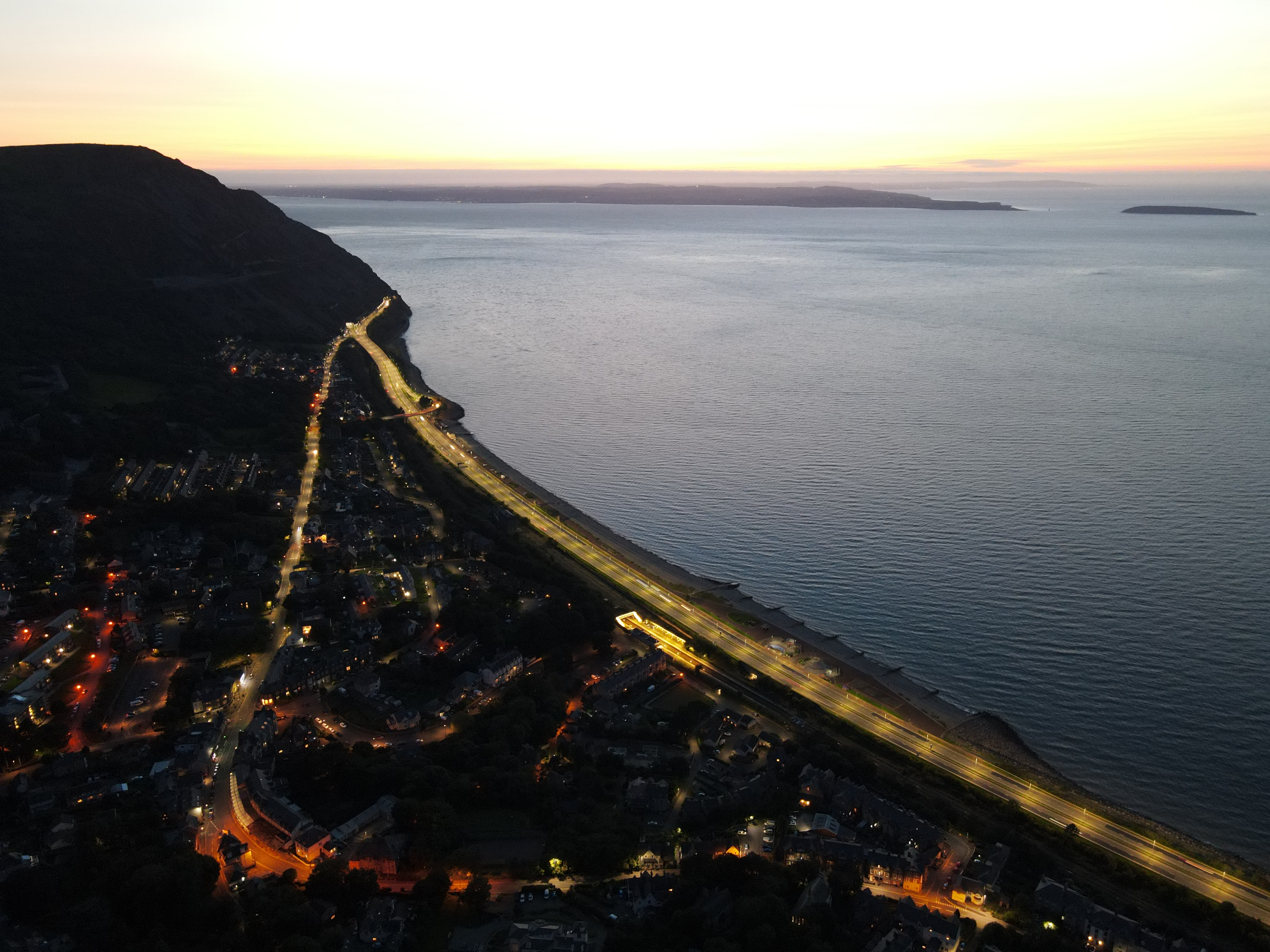
This view at sunset shows how the modern A55 Expressway bypasses the older road through the town centre before resuming the original route around the headland.

Arriva Buses Wales routes 5 and 5D run every 15 minutes between Caernarfon and Llandudno, route 5D serving Deganwy and Maesdu and route 5 serving St Gwynan's (For Dwygyfylchi) and Craig-y-don eastbound and both services serve Bangor and Y Felinheli westbound. A Saturday service X2 has been introduced by Padarn Bus that runs direct between Penmaenmawr and Llandudno eastbound, and to Llanberis via Bangor westbound. Llew Jones runs the Conwy Clipa service 75 between Llanfairfechan and Llandudno.

=== Road ===
Penmaenmawr lies on the route of the A55 Expressway providing access at Junction 16 and at 16A to Dwygyfylchi to and from the rest of the north coast. A mountain route through Capelulo links the towns to Conwy via Sychnant.

=== Train ===
There is an hourly Transport for Wales service from Penmaenmawr railway station to Holyhead westbound and Manchester Airport via Chester eastbound, on the North Wales Coast Line on Mondays to Saturdays. There is also an irregular Sunday service to Holyhead, Chester and Crewe.

== Notable people ==
- William Gladstone Prime Minister, regular visitor in 19th century
- Innes Lloyd, television producer and actor
