= Borlase =

Borlase is a surname and masculine given name.

A branch of the family De Taillefer, of Périgord, who were descended from the Count of Angoulême, came to England before the reign of Henry III (1207–1272). A king granted lands in the parish of St Wenn in Cornwall to Frank (French) Borlas Taillefer. Following the ancient Cornish tradition, the family adopted the name of their place of residence, Borlas, as their surname. Originally Borlase was a manor, but the name now exists as three farms: Borlase-Vath, Borlase Burgess and Borlase farm near Rosenannon.

A common saying in west Cornwall was ″Borlases were in Cornwall before the birth of Christ″.

== People with the surname ==
- Charles Borlase (1820–1875), New Zealand politician, Mayor of Wellington
- Darryl Borlase (born 1958), Australian footballer
- Deirdre Borlase (1925–2018), English painter and printmaker
- Edmund Borlase (1620–1682), Irish Protestant historian
- George Borlase (1743–1809), Knightbridge Professor of Philosophy at Cambridge
- Henry Borlase (c. 1590 – c. 1624), English politician and Member of Parliament
- Isobel Borlase (born 2004), Australian basketball player
- James Borlase (born 2002), Australian footballer
- Jenny Borlase (born 1968), Australian netball player
- John Borlase (disambiguation)
- Nancy Borlase (1914–2006), New Zealand-born Australian painter and critic
- Peter Borlase (born 1985), New Zealand rugby player and coach
- William Borlase (disambiguation)

== People with the given name ==
- Borlase Wyndham Childs (1876–1946), British Army major-general and Assistant Commissioner of Police of the Metropolis (London)
- Borlase Warren (1677–1747), English Member of Parliament
- Borlase Richmond Webb (c. 1696 – 1738), British landowner and Tory politician
