= List of Cornish saints =

Flag of St Piran, used as a flag of Cornwall

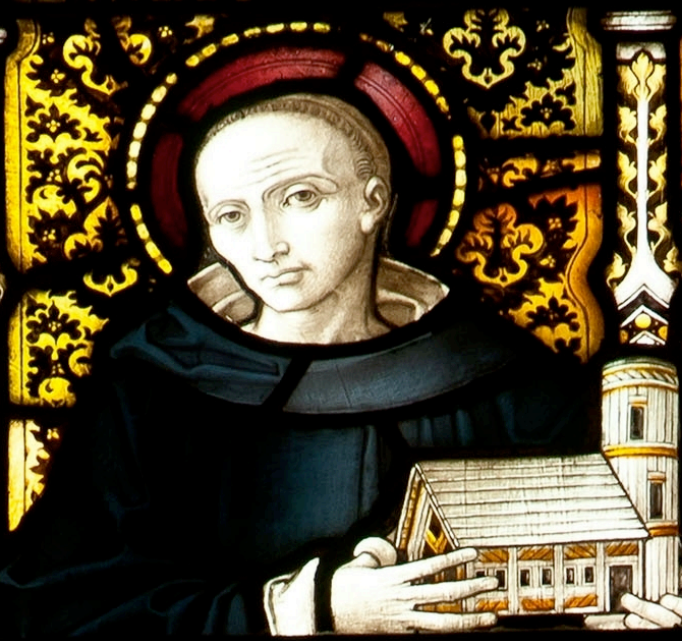
St Piran portrayed in a stained glass window in Truro Cathedral

This is a list of Cornish saints, including saints more loosely associated with Cornwall: many of them will have links to sites elsewhere in regions with significant ancient British history, such as Wales, Brittany or Devon.

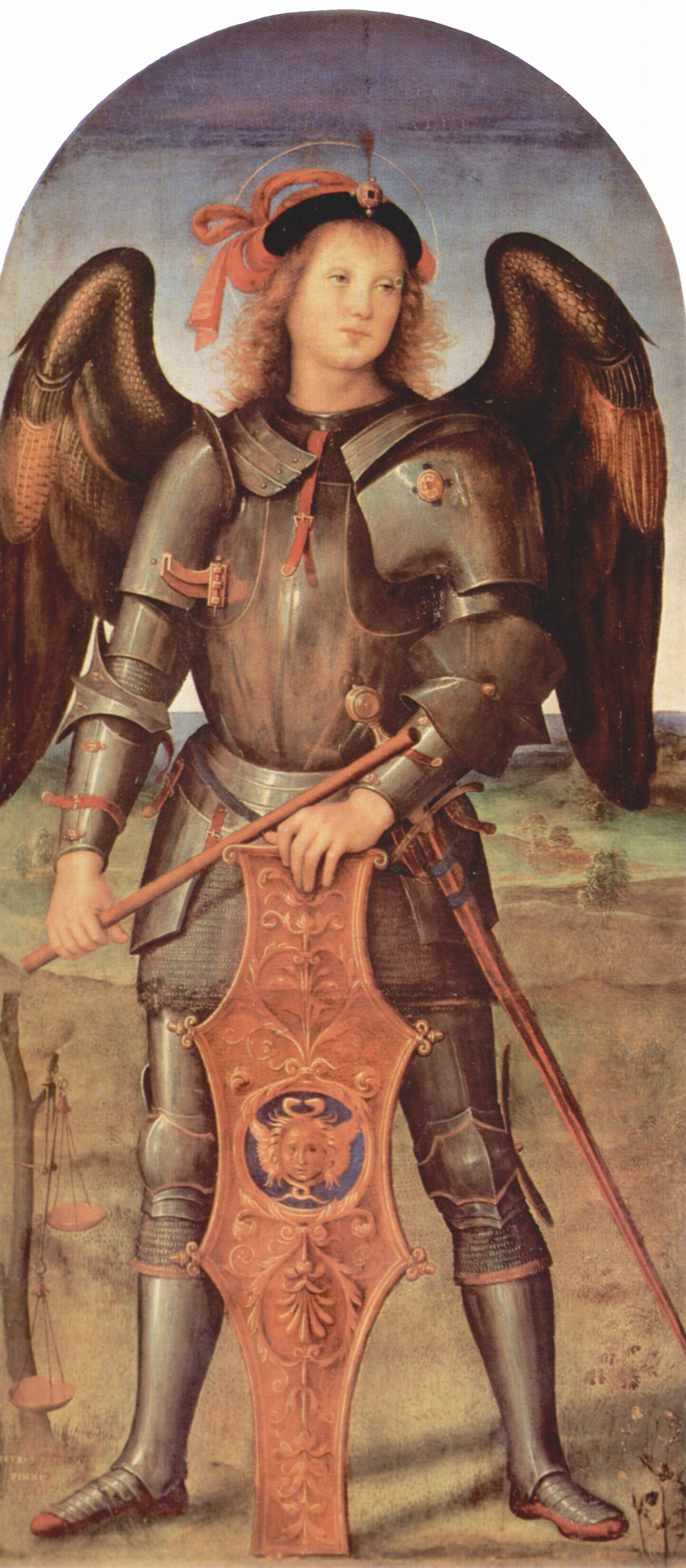
The Archangel Michael from Perugino's triptych in the Certosa of Pavia *The Archangel Michael was recognized as the patron saint of Cornwall in medieval times; his cult however was introduced to the land by the Normans. In the calendar of the Church of England diocese of Truro, 8 May is the feast of St. Michael, Protector of Cornwall. The archangel Michael is one of the three patron saints of Cornwall.

== Patron saints of Cornwall ==
The modern patron saint of Cornwall is considered to be Saint Piran, who is the namesake of the villages of Perranzabuloe and Perranuthnoe. Saint Piran also serves as the patron saint of tin miners, with tin and copper mining historically serving as major industries in Cornwall.

The Archangel Michael and Saint Petroc have also been listed as patron saints of Cornwall. Saint Michael is still recognised by the Anglican Church as the "Protector of Cornwall", and Saint Petroc was patron of the Cornish diocese and founded the monastery of Bodmin.

== Cornish saints ==
- Saint Austell
- Saint Breaca
- Saint Bryvyth (Brevita)
- Saint Buriana
- Saint Carantoc
- Saint Cuby
- Saint Endelienta
- Saint Erth
- Saint Euny
- Saint Felec
- Saint Gerren
- Saint Gudwal or Gurval
- Saint Gwinear
- Saint Gwinnodock
- Saint Ia (Ives)
- Saint Ivo of Ramsey
- Saint Kea
- Saint Keyne
- Saint Levan
- Saint Lide
- Saint Mabyn
- Saint Madern of Madron
- Saint Materiana (Madryn of Gwent)
- Saint Mawes
- Saint Melor
- Saint Menefrida
- Saint Meriasek
- Saint Morwenna
- Saint Nectan
- Saint Neot
- Saint Nonna
- Saint Padarn
- Saint Petroc, "the captain of Cornish saints" according to Thomas Fuller
- Saint Piran, the patron saint of tin miners and of Cornwall
- Saint Rumonus
- Saint Samson of Dol
- Saint Senara
- Saint Senanus (or Senana) of Sennen
- Saint Sulien
- Saint Tallanus
- Saint Tetha
- Saint Tudy
- Saint Veep
- Saint Wenna
- Saint Wyllow

== Other saints associated with Cornwall ==
- Saint Blaise, a saint from historical Lesser Armenia who lends his name to the Cornish town of St Blazey and the civil parish of St Blaise
- Saint Budoc, a Breton saint with associations to Devon. The Cornish village of Budock Water and its church of St. Budock are named after the saint.
- Saint Clarus, an 8th-century English saint founded a parish church in St. Cleer, Cornwall before he fled to hermitage in Saint-Clair-sur-Epte, France.
- Saint Constantine, one or many British or Pictish saints revered in Devon and Cornwall, lending his name to the Cornish villages of Constantine and Constantine Bay.
- Saint Day (patron of St Day)
- Saint Dominica, namesake of the Cornish village of St. Dominic
- Saint Gluvias (patron of St Gluvias)
- Saint Gwithian (patron of Gwithian)
- Saint Hydrock (patron of Lanhydrock)
- Saint Indract
- Saint Julitta (patron of Lanteglos by Camelford and St Juliot)
- Saint Justus, fourth archbishop of Canterbury; patron of St Just in Penwith and St Just in Roseland
- Saint Sidwell, an 8th-century saint from Exeter with a dedicated church and holy well in the Cornish village of Laneast
- Saint Ursula, a 4th-century Romano-British saint thought to have been the daughter of Dionotus, ruler of Cornwall. However, this attribution to her ancestry has been identified as a potential misreading of the Latin words Deo notus by Geoffrey of Monmouth, the 12th-century British cleric and writer.
- Saint Winwaloe, a Breton saint born to Cornish parents. St. Wynwallow's Church in Landewednack, Cornwall, is dedicated to him and is the most southerly parish in mainland Britain.

== Honorary canons of Truro ==
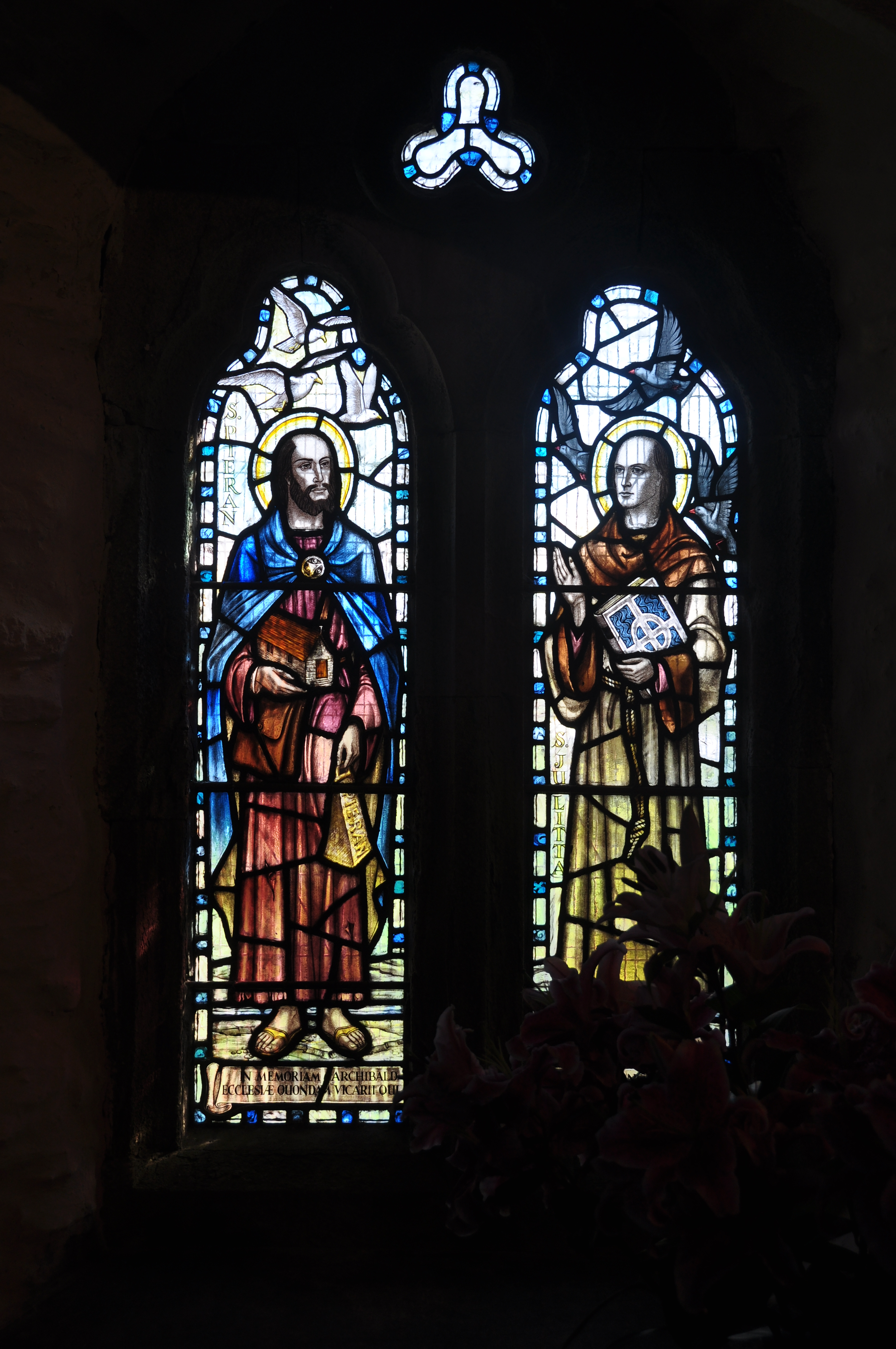
A stained glass window in the chancel of Tintagel church which depicts St Piran (left) and St Julitta

The 24 honorary canons of Truro Cathedral occupy stalls named after 24 saints (almost all of them Cornish): Carantoc; Buriana; Germoe; Conan; Winwalloe; Nectan; Petroc; Adwenna; Piran; Constantine; Cybi; Paul; Breaca; Neot; Rumon; Sampson; German; Meriadoc; Euni; Ia; Endelienta; Columb; Corentin; Aldhelm.

== Modern Cornish saints ==
More recent Cornishmen recognized for sanctity include the Irish-Cornish martyr Blessed John Cornelius.

Some of the bishops of Truro are commemorated in the calendar: Edward White Benson, John Gott and Walter Frere.

== See also ==
- Llan place name element
- List of Welsh saints
- List of saints of the Canary Islands
