= Morwenna =

Eponymous patron saint of Morwenstow, Cornwall, UK

Saint Morwenna
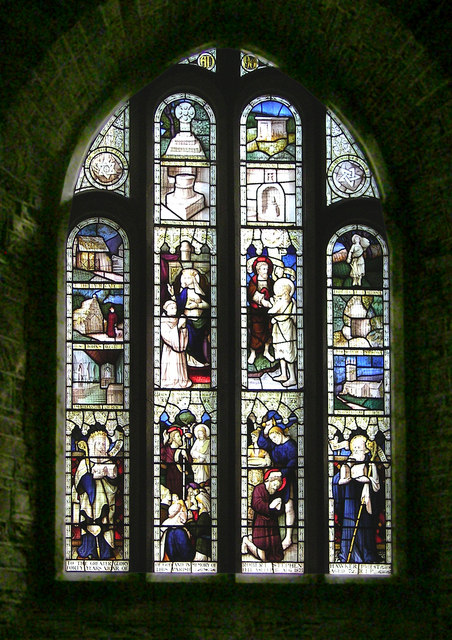
- A stained glass window at the Church of St Morwenna (with her depicted in the bottom-left)
- Died: 6th century
- Honored in: Anglican Church, Roman Catholic Church, Eastern Orthodox Church
- Canonized: Pre-Congregation
- Feast: 8 July
- Patronage: Morwenstow, Cornwall, England

Morwenna is the eponymous patron saint of Morwenstow, a civil parish and village in north Cornwall, UK. Her name is thought to be cognate with Welsh morwyn "maiden", although the first name is also used in Wales and Brittany and said to be composed of "Mor" and "Gwenn", meaning "White sea" in both Welsh and Breton.

== Life ==
Morwenna first appears in a 12th-century life of Saint Nectan that lists her alongside Endelient, Mabyn and Menfre (among many others) as a daughter of the Welsh king Brychan.

She was trained in Ireland before crossing over to Cornwall. Morwenna made her home in a little hermitage at Hennacliff (the Raven's Crag), afterwards called Morwenstow (meaning "Morwenna's holy-place"). It stands near the top of a high cliff overlooking the Atlantic Ocean, where the sea is almost constantly stormy, and from where, in certain atmospheric conditions, the coast of Wales can be seen. She built a church there, for the local people, with her own hands. It is said that she carried the stone on her head from beneath the cliff and where she once stopped for a rest, a spring gushed forth to the west of the church.

Early in the sixth century, while she lay dying, her brother, St. Nectan, came to see her, and she asked him to raise her up so that she might look once more on her native shore. She was buried at the church in Morwenstow.

A painting was later found on the north wall of the Morwenstow church, thought to represent St. Morwenna. It shows a gaunt female clasping a scroll to her breast with her left hand; the right arm is raised in blessing over a kneeling monk.

A local saint, she is depicted in a stained glass window of the parish church, St Morwenna and St John the Baptist's (Saint John was added as a dedication c. 1275 when the church was given to St John the Baptist's hospital in Bridgwater).

Morwenna of Morwenstow is commonly misidentified with "Marwenne" of Marhamchurch and the patron of Lamorran, a saint "Moren".

== Morwenna's Well ==
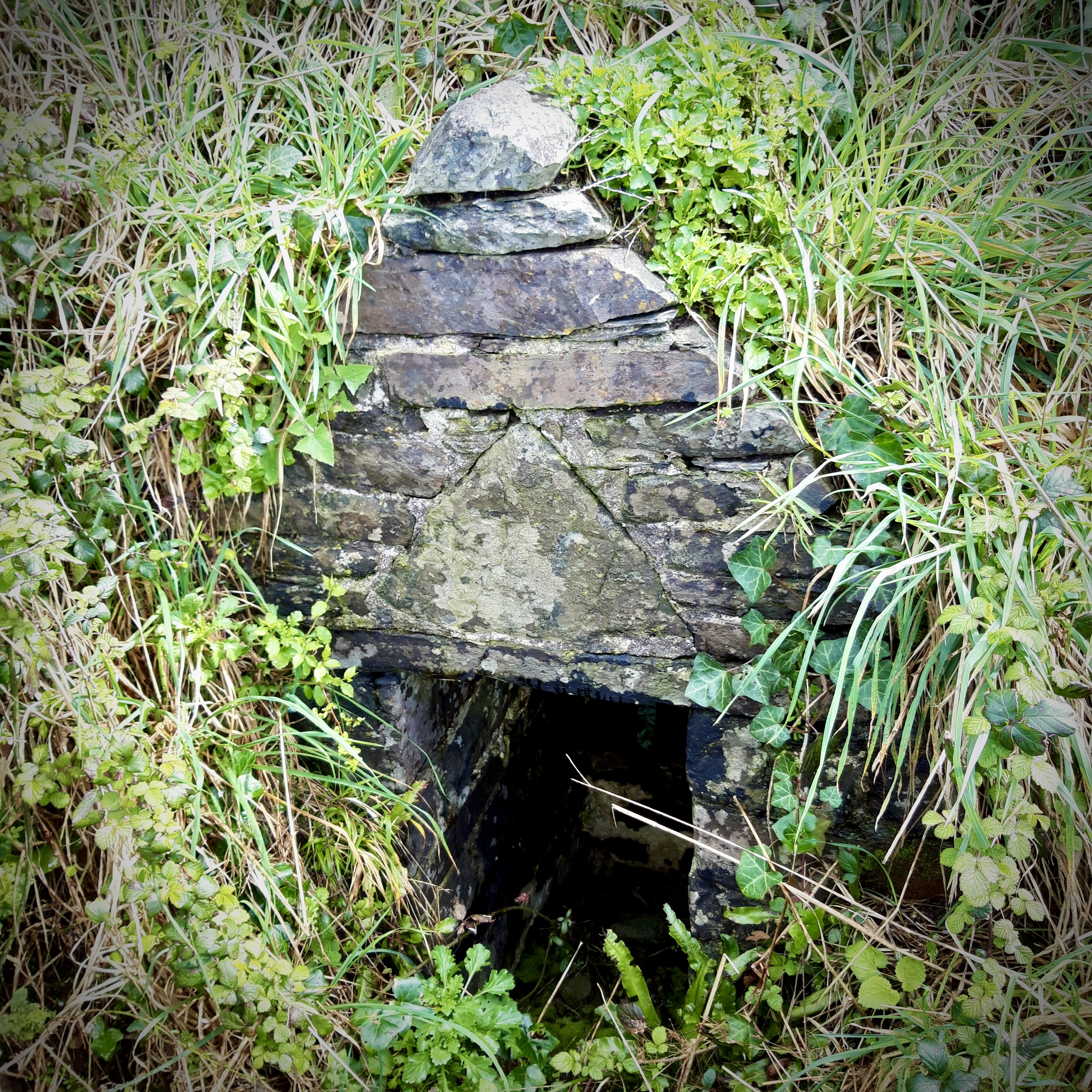
The well house of the holy well of St Morwenna

According to Nicholas Orme, a holy well in the parish (at SS 198 153) is nowadays associated with her; it is located just over 500 metres to the west of the church, 'halfway down a precipice' and is now dry. The well house is a grade II listed building. In legend this is the spot where Morwenna once stopped to rest whilst carrying stones from the beach below up to the church she was building on the cliff top.

== See also ==
- Christianity in Cornwall
