= Saint Wenna =

Cornish and Welsh saint

Wenna
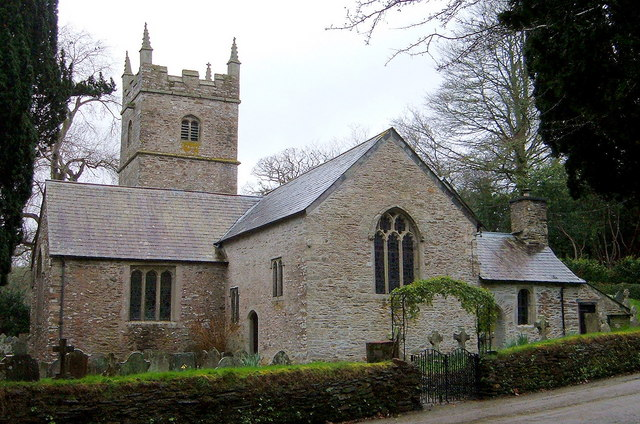
- St Wenna's Church, Morval, Cornwall
- Died: c. 492 AD; Talgarth
- Feast: 18 October
- Patronage: St Wenna's Church, Morval, Cornwall; St Wenn

Wenna (Welsh: Gwen) was a medieval princess and Christian martyr who flourished in Wales and Cornwall. Later venerated as a saint, she is honoured at multiple churches in Cornwall and Devon.

== Life ==
According to the 12th-century Life of Nectan, Wenna was one of the twelve daughters of Brychan, a legendary king of Brycheiniog (modern-day Wales). Her siblings included Nectan, Mabyn, Ninnoc, and numerous other Brythonic saints. According to tradition, she was martyred by Saxons at Talgarth in 492.

== Veneration ==
Two churches and two chapels have been dedicated to a saint by the name of Wenna: a 12th-century chapel at Cheristow in Hartland parish in Devon, the 13th-century parish church of St Wenn, a 14th-century chapel at St Kew, and the 15th-century parish church of Morval, Cornwall. The dedication of the parish church of Morval, however, is sometimes attributed to another Saint Wenna, a 5th-century queen of Cornwall and sister of Saint Non. Wenna may have also had a holy well dedicated to her at St Wenn, but no specific records corroborate this.

Her feast day is 18 October, which is shared with the other Saint Wenna.
