= St Mabyn Parish Church =

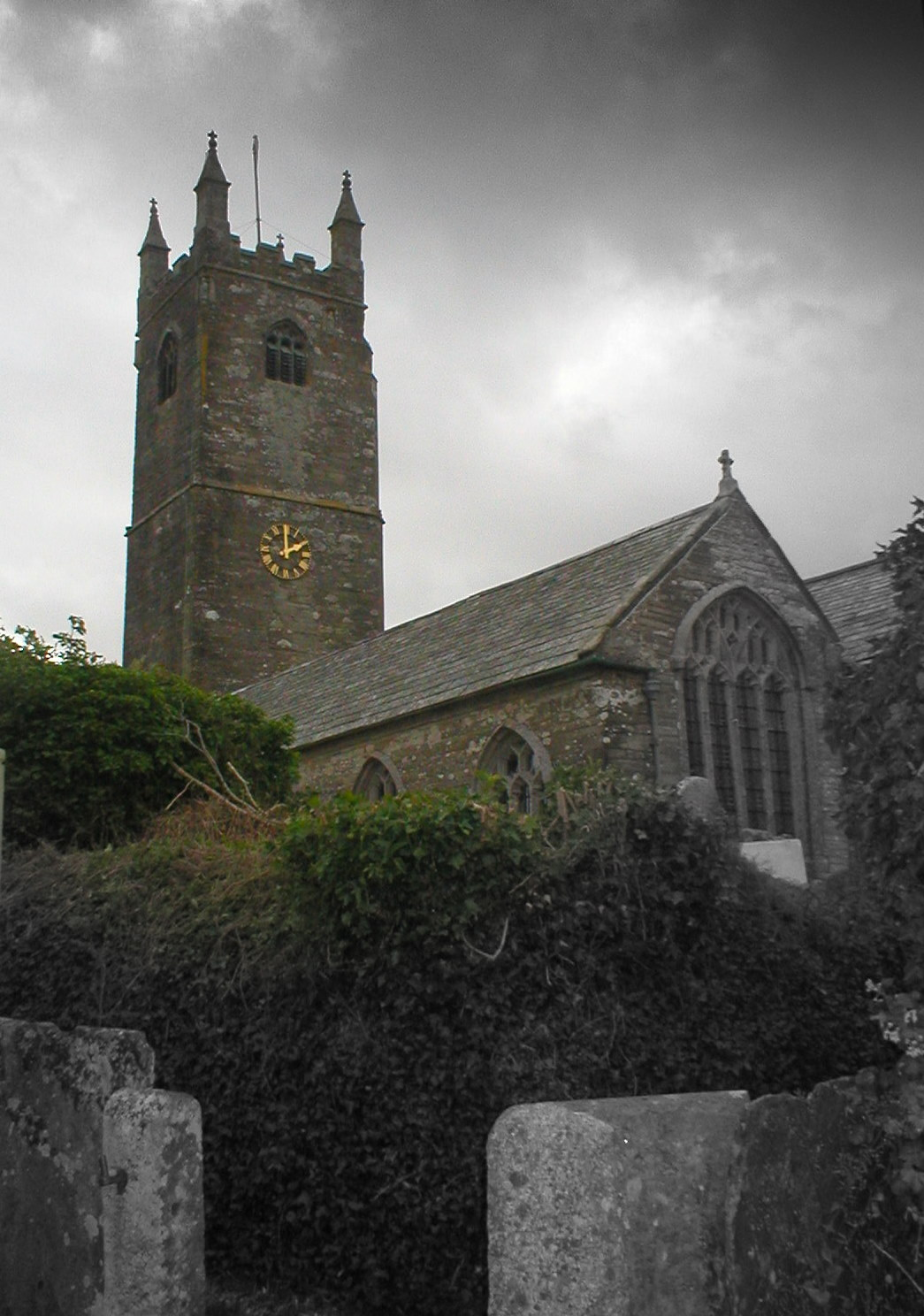
- St. Mabyn Parish Church, St.Mabyn
- St Mabyn Parish Church
- 50°31′32″N 4°45′50″W
- OS grid reference: SX 042 732
- Denomination: Church of England
- Website: St Mabyn Church website

History
- Dedication: Mabyn

Administration
- Province: Canterbury
- Diocese: Truro
- Archdeaconry: Bodmin
- Deanery: Trigg Minor
- Parish: St Mabyn, Cornwall
- Location within Cornwall

Listed Building – Grade I
- Official name: Church of St Mabena
- Designated: 4 November 1988
- Reference no.: 1161735

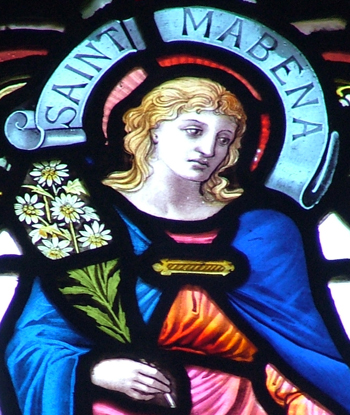
Saint Mabena (detail of stained glass window)

St Mabyn Church is a Grade I listed late 15th-century Church of England parish church in St Mabyn, Cornwall, United Kingdom. The church is dedicated to Saint Mabyn or Mabena, who was regarded in local tradition as one of the many children of Brychan, a Welsh saint and King of Brycheiniog in the 5th century.

== History and description ==
The current church replaced an earlier one also dedicated to Mabyn. Mabyn is listed alongside several other local saints with churches dedicated to them in the 12th-century Life of Saint Nectan, suggesting that the earlier church had already been established at that time.

A dendrochronology report gives construction dates of 1513–35 for the north aisle, 1485–1514 for the nave, and 1487–1523 for the porch. A song to the patron saint was sung at the dedication. Built in the Perpendicular style, with possible Norman origins, it consists of a chancel, nave and north and south aisles. Several monuments were removed by Rev. Granville Leveson-Gower in 1818 and some restoration occurred in 1884; it was re-seated and repaved in 1889. The building is of ashlar slate stone on a moulded plinth and wall plate, rag slate roofs with gable ends. The arcades each have seven four-centred arches of granite, supported by monolith granite pillars with sculpted capitals of St Stephens porcelain stone.

The tower of three stages is 85 feet in height, with a battlemented parapet and crocketted finials, the top stage is decorated with four carved figures, possibly the Four Evangelists. There is a piscina (used to cleanse sacred vessels after mass at the high altar) on the north side and the remains of rood loft stairs, now built up. In the south aisle is a second piscina and a priest's doorway. The font is one of Norman table-top type: it has a circular basin, hollowed in a square block decorated with blind arcade set on a round ornamented shaft.

The earliest recorded Priest in charge was Roger de Worlegan in 1267. Charles Peters, rector 1726–75, was recognized as the finest Hebrew scholar in Europe; his Dissertation on the Book of Job was published in 1751.

The register dates from the year 1562.

A credence table which survives in the church may originally have been the panel of a tomb raised in Mabena's honour. It is possible that all her sisters had tombs erected for them.

One of the stained glass windows is a memorial to Francis John Hext, of Tredethy, who died in January, 1803, and Margaret (Lang), his wife who died in March, 1794.

There were five bells in 1787 and later six, bell casting took place in a nearby garden called "bell garden". A church clock was installed in 1950. The belfry has a ring of eight bells that allows 5,030 changes to be rung.

The graveyard contains 12 Grade II listed headstones.

In 2008 extensive refurbishment of the roof was undertaken, including replacement of lead valleys, renewal of granite copings, replacement of cast iron gutters and ceiling repairs, the work cost £115,000 and was partly funded by English Heritage.

In March 2014 thieves broke into the church and stole a 19th-century painting of Christ's preparation for entombment (a copy of a work by Italian artist Jacopo Bassano) and also a policeman's truncheon dated 1807.

The Priest in charge is David Seymour and the minister is David Pollard.

== Gallery ==
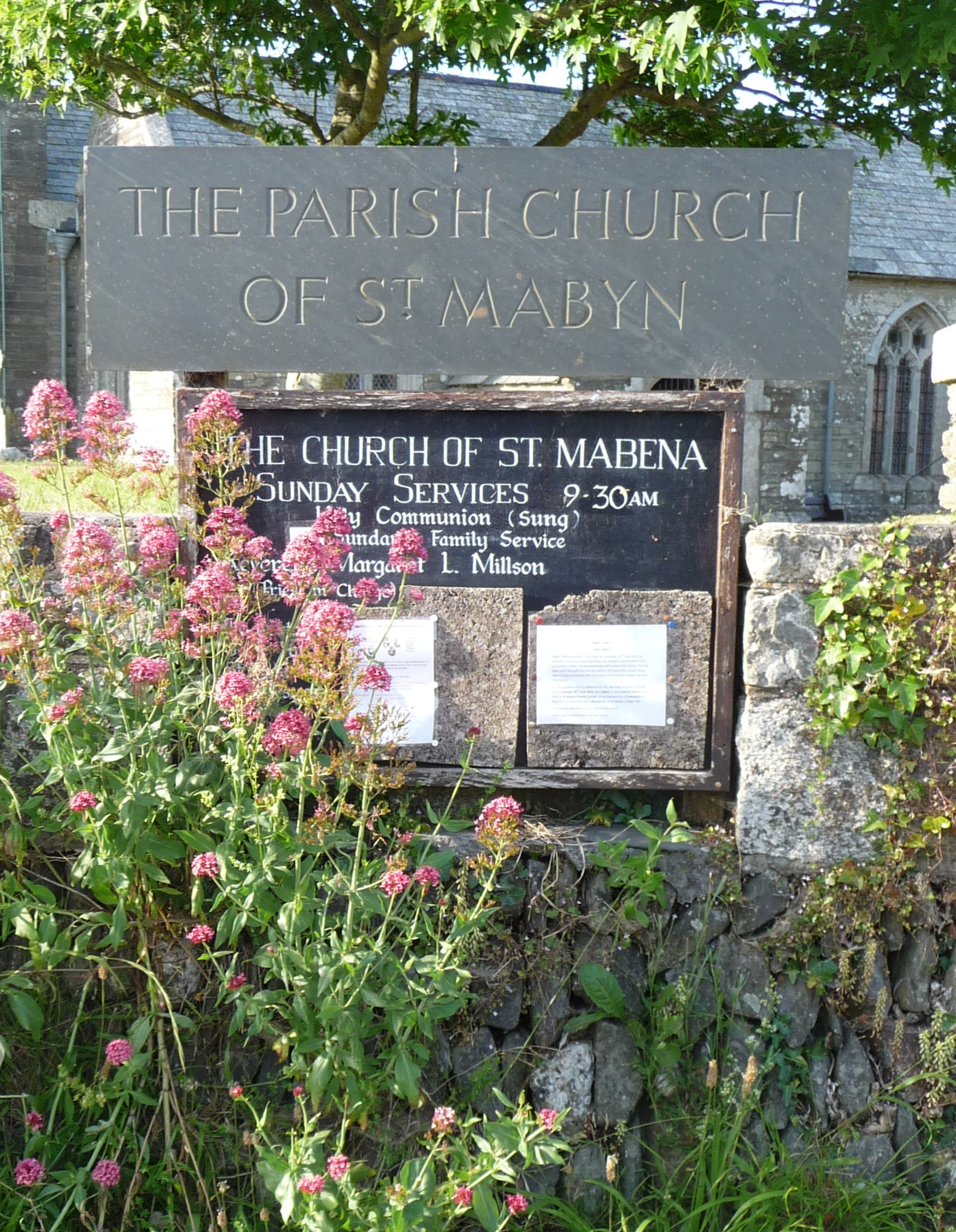
St Mabena church sign

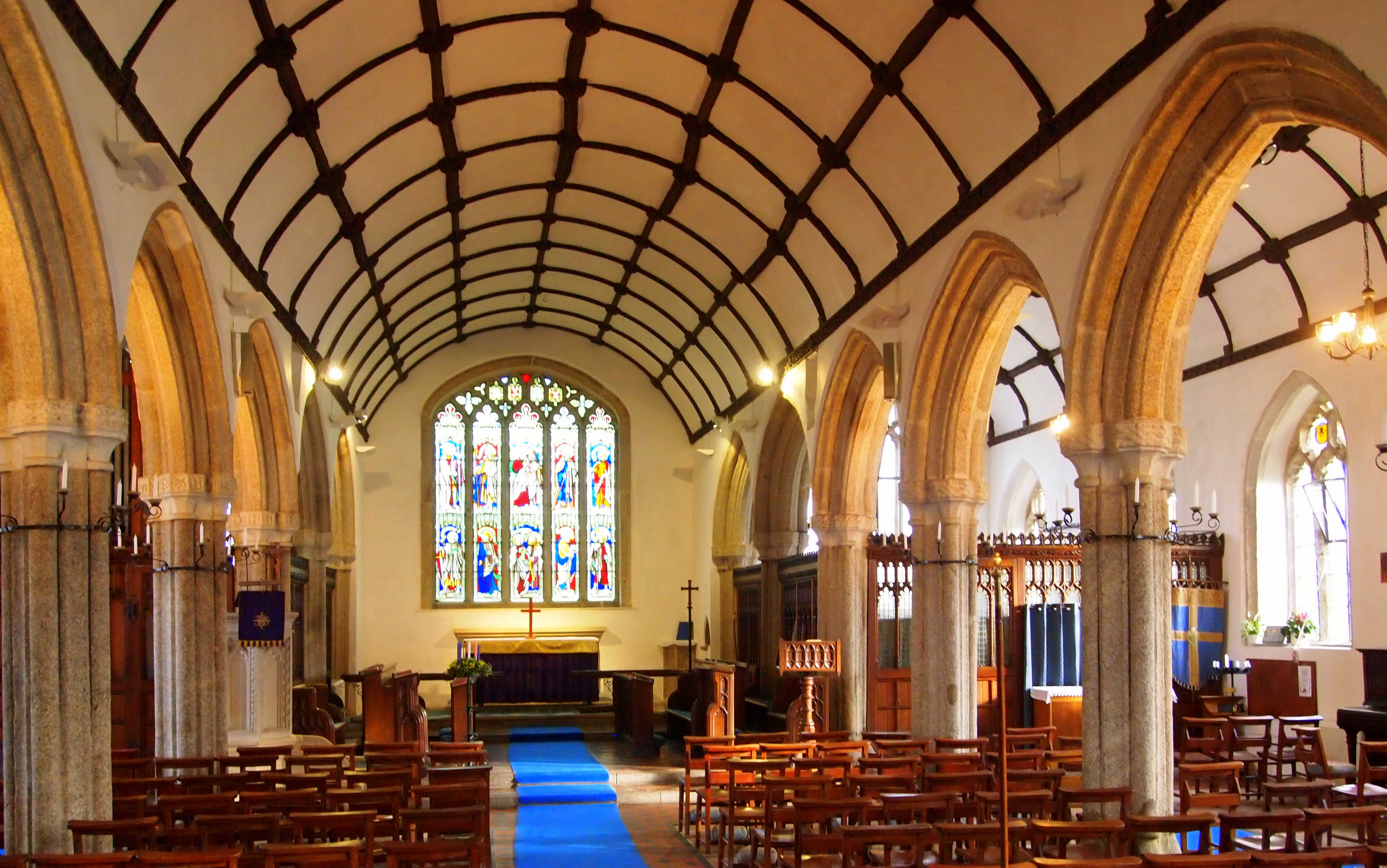
St Mabyn Church nave

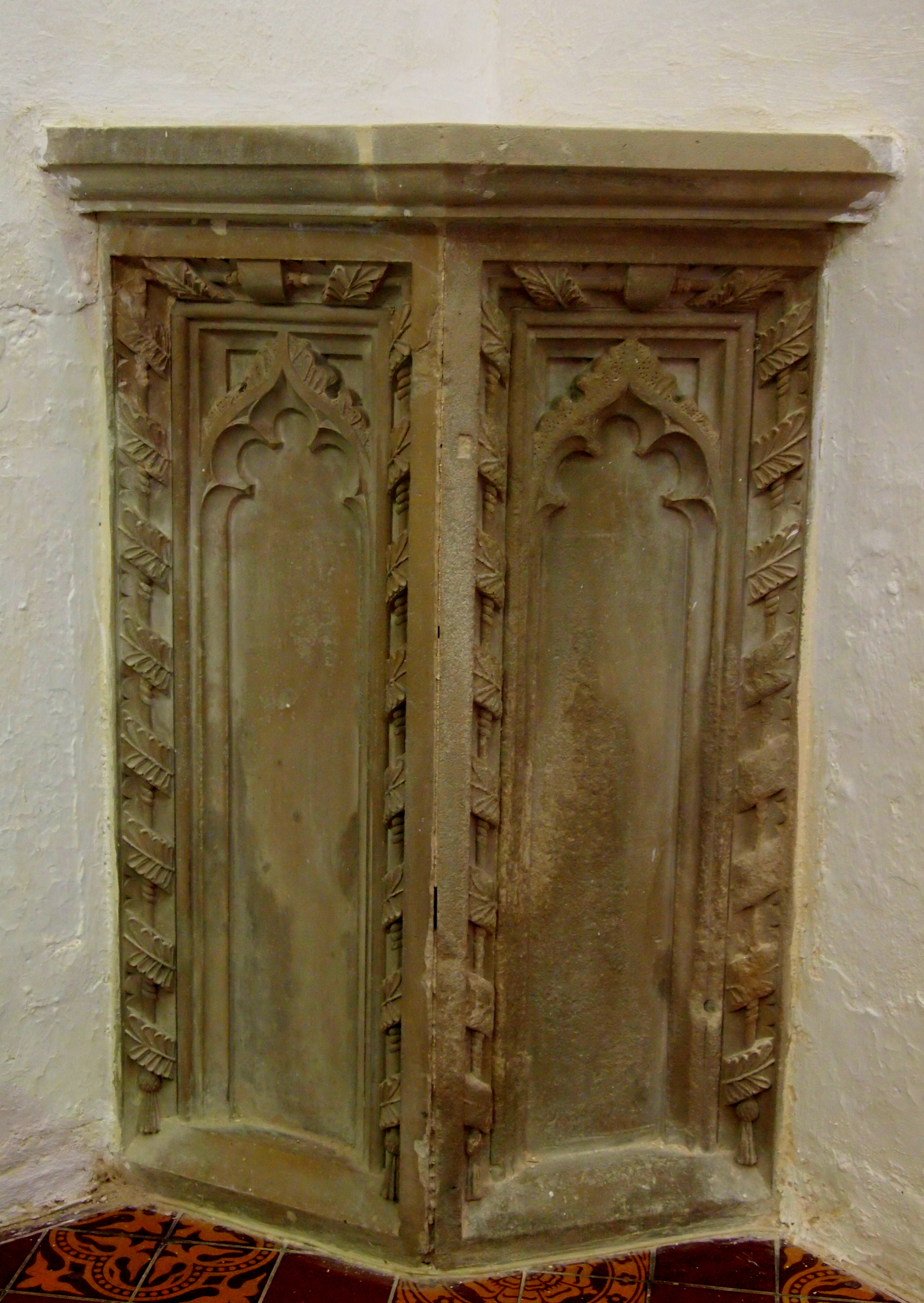
Credence table in St Mabyn Church

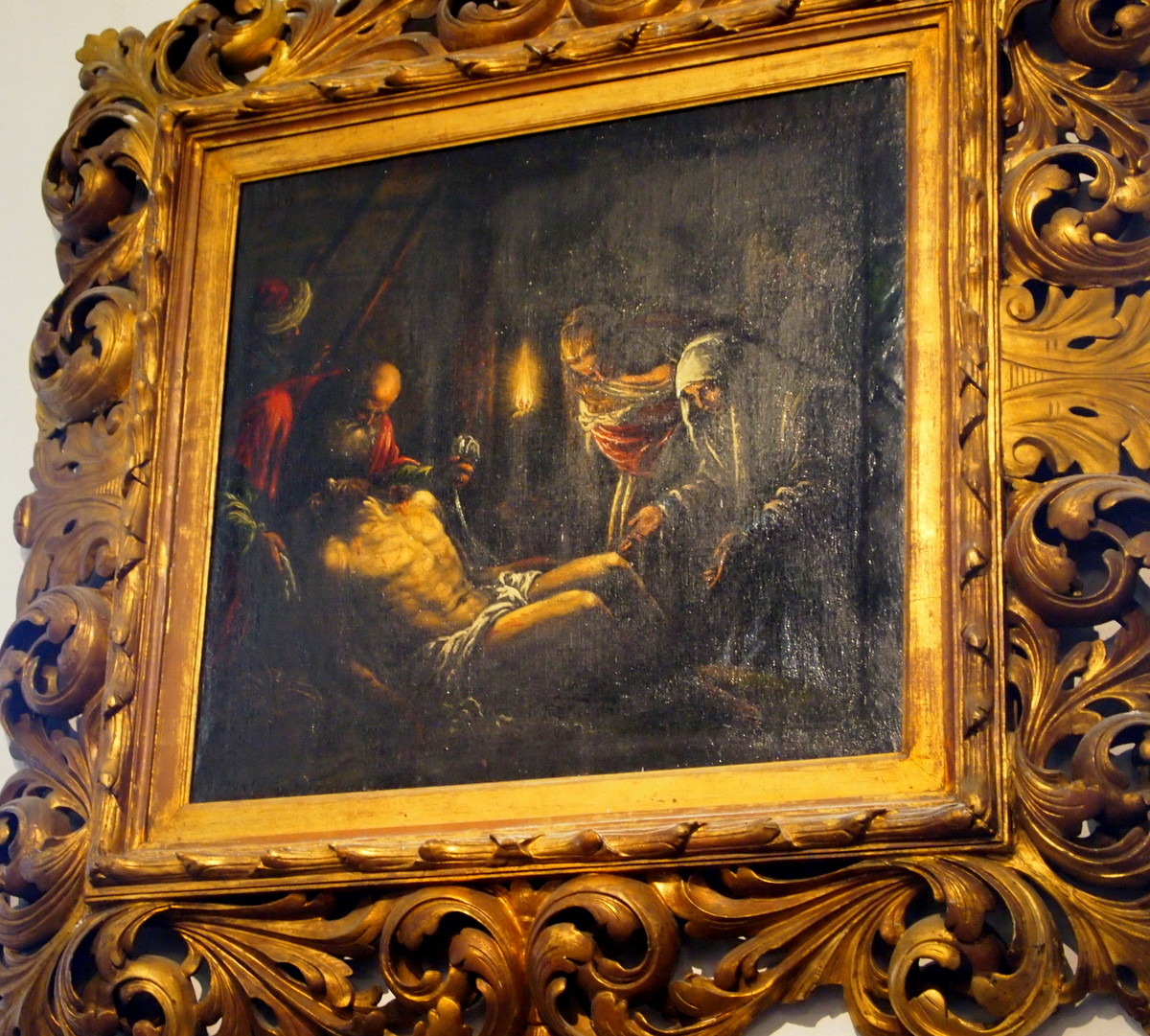
19th-century painting of Christ's preparation for entombment stolen from St Mabyn Church

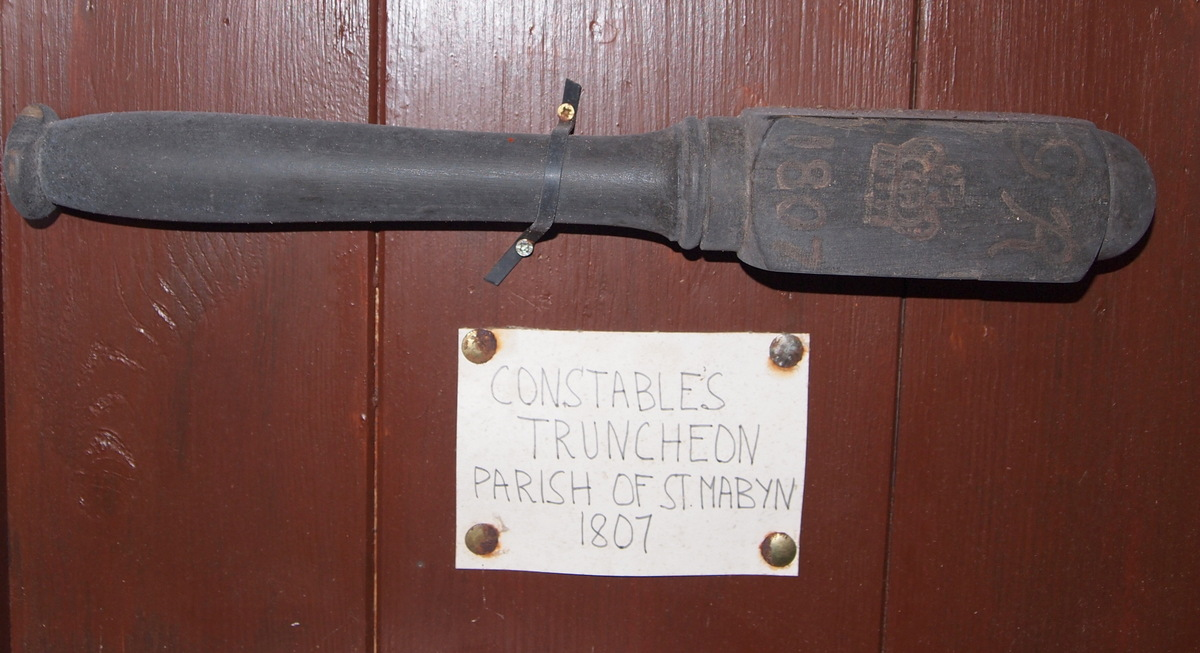
Police constable's Truncheon displayed in St Mabyn Parish Church dated 1807 stolen in March 2014
