= Rosenannon Downs =

Nature reserve in mid Cornwall, England

Rosenannon Bog and Downs
- Site of Special Scientific Interest
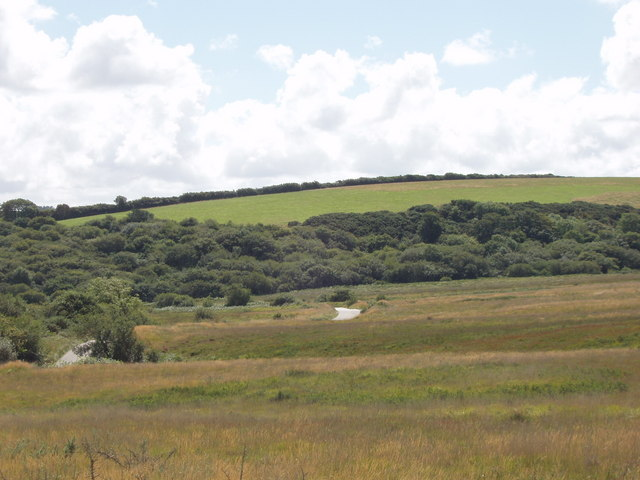
- Heathland of Rosenannon Downs

- Location within Cornwall Location within England
- Location of Rosenannon Bog and Downs.
- Area of search: Cornwall
- Grid reference: SW955675
- Coordinates: 50.4713°N 4.8834°W
- Interest: Biological
- Area: 135.5 hectares (1.355 km^{2}; 0.5232 sq mi)
- Notification date: 1951

Rosenannon Downs is a nature reserve in mid Cornwall, England, UK, being designated Rosenannon Bog and Downs Site of Special Scientific Interest (SSSI), noted for its biological characteristics. The site supports a wide variety of flora and fauna and includes Bronze Age barrows. Conservation work is carried out on the site by the owners, the Cornwall Wildlife Trust.

== Geography ==
The 135.5-hectare (335-acre) SSSI, notified in 1979, is located north of the hamlet of Rosenannon within the civil parish of St Wenn, 6 kilometres (3.7 mi) south-west of the town of Wadebridge. The streams rising on this site feed into the River Camel Valley and Tributaries SSSI.

The nature reserve is owned and managed by the Cornwall Wildlife Trust. The Downs have been leased by the Trust from 1999 and were bequeathed to them in 2009 by Theresa Knowles.

== History ==
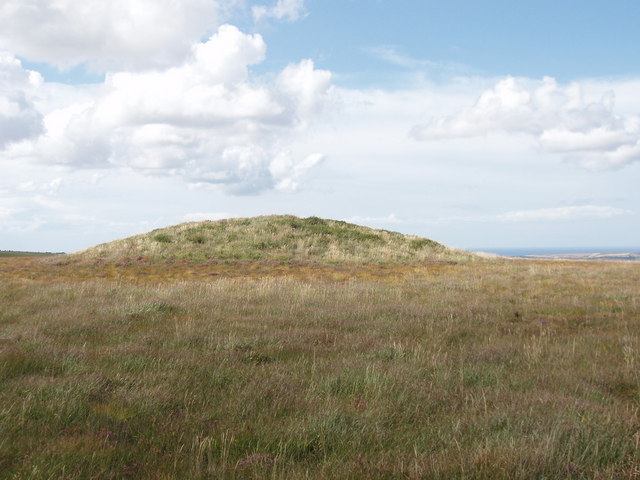
A Bronze Age barrow within the nature reserve

To the north of the site are three Bronze Age barrows, dated to around 2500 BC.

The SSSI was previously named Rosenannon Bog, but was renamed after the site was expanded to its current limits. The Downs have not been grazed since the 1960s, although a proposal to reintroduce this is going ahead.

== Wildlife and ecology ==
=== Flora ===
The two main types of habitat on the site are heathland and bogland, which support a wide variety of species.

The dry heath comprises five main species of plant, of which the common heather (Calluna vulgaris) is the most prolific with bell heather (Erica cinerea) and western gorse (Ulex gallii) also dominant; bristle bent (Agrostis curtisii) and purple moor-grass (Molinia caerulea) to a lesser extent. Other species found in this habitat are heath milkwort (Polygala serpyllifolia), lousewort (Pedicularis sylvatica), saw-wort (Serratula tinctoria), deer grass (Trichophorum cespitosum) and the heath spotted-orchid (Dactylorhiza maculata).

The wet heath areas also contain purple moor-grass along with bog myrtle (Myrica gale) and cross-leaved heath (Erica tetralix) as the three most prolific species. Black bogrush (Schoenus nigricans) are prominent in the wetter, more base-rich parts, whereas bog mosses (Sphagnum spp.) and the insectivorous round-leaved sundew (Drosera rotundifolia) can be found in the wet hollows.

Along with cross-leaved heath and purple moor-grass the valley bog habitat supports bog asphodel (Narthecium ossifragum), bog pimpernel (Lysimachia tenella, syn. Anagallis tenella), common cottongrass (Eriophorum angustifolium), lesser skullcap (Scutellaria minor), pale butterwort (Pinguicula lusitanica) and white beak-sedge (Rhynchospora alba). Royal fern (Osmunda regalis) and wavy St. John's-wort (Hypericum undulatum), species which are not common within Britain, can also be found in the bogland. A broad-leaved woodland surrounds the valley bog which mainly contains sessile oak (Quercus petraea), and willows (Salix spp.).

An area of scrub is present on the southern edge of the Downs, which supports Cornish bladderseed (Physospermum cornubiense).

=== Fauna ===
Heathland birds which feed, nest and breed on the site include the common snipe (Gallinago gallinago), curlew (Numenius arquata), and the meadow pipit (Anthus pratensis), as well as the European stonechat (Saxicola rubicola), which is in national decline. Other birds recorded on the reserve include the hen harrier (Circus cyaneus), Montagu's harrier (Circus pygargus) and the skylark (Alauda arvensis).

=== Conservation ===
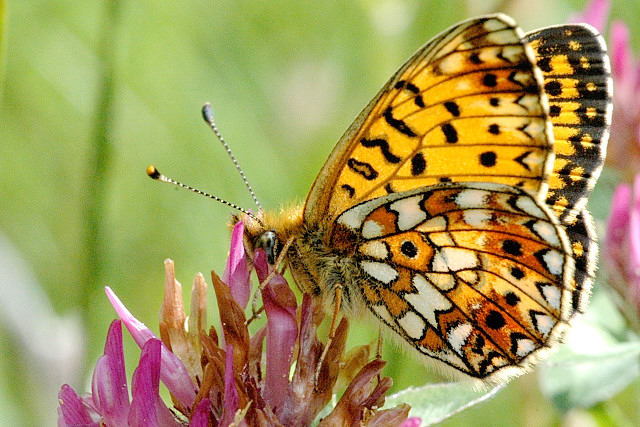
The small pearl-bordered fritillary butterfly

The Cornwall Wildlife Trust has been given permission by the Secretary of State for Environment to allow the site to be fenced in order to re-introduce cattle grazing on the site for management purposes. This is to be carried out in order to reduce the chance of uncontrolled fires and to benefit the small pearl-bordered fritillary butterfly (Boloria selene), whose larva feed mainly on marsh violet (Viola palustris) on the mid–Cornwall moors; a low–growing plant which is out competed by the more vigorous purple moor-grass. Fencing to enable cattle grazing was started in December 2011. For the third year in the last four there has been an uncontrolled fire on the reserve which is thought to be arson; the latest in March 2012 burnt 52 hectares (130 acres).
