= Enodoc =

Cornish saint

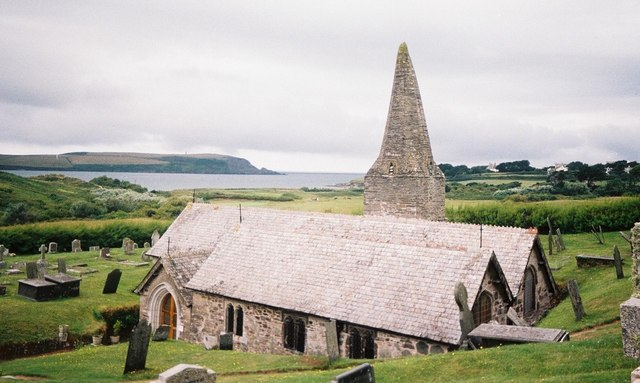
St Enodoc church, Trebetherick

Saint Enodoc, originally Wenedoc, was a sub-Roman Pre-congregational saint of Cornwall.

Enodoc was originally recorded as a man. Historian Nicholas Orme says that in the 16th century the name was apparently misunderstood as that of a woman.

Enodoc's feast day was observed at Bodmin Priory on 7 March. St Enodoc's Church, the parish church of Trebetherick in Cornwall is dedicated to this saint, and its churchyard is home to the grave of John Betjeman.

Enodoc should not be confused with Saint Enoder, who was probably a son of King Brychan Brycheiniog, originally called Wenheden.
