= Gerard Legh =

Gerard Legh or Leigh (died 1563) was an English lawyer, known as a writer on heraldry.

== Life ==
He was the son of Henry Legh, draper, of Fleet Street, London, by his first wife Isabel Cailis or Callis. He was educated by Robert Wroth of Durants in Enfield, Middlesex, and probably by Richard Goodrich. Though Anthony Wood places him in the Athenæ Oxonienses (i. 428), he was not a student at the University of Oxford.

He served an apprenticeship to his father and became a member of the Drapers' Company. Subsequently, he became a member of the Inner Temple. He travelled in France, and in 1562 was preparing for a journey to Venice. He died of the plague on 13 October 1563, and was buried on the 15th at St. Dunstan-in-the-West, where a monument was erected to his memory. He left a widow, Alice, and five daughters.

== The Accedens of Armory ==
Legh's only work, entitled The Accedens of Armory, London, 1562 (later editions, some published as The Accedence of Armorie, 1568, 1572, 1576, 1591, 1597, and 1612), is written in form of a colloquy between "Gerarde the Herehaught and Legh the Caligat Knight". Richard Argall of the Inner Temple supplied a prefatory address and probably part of the later passages of the book. In endeavouring to explain the art of heraldry, Legh is purposely obscure from fear of entrenching on the official privileges of the College of Arms. The work supplies what appears to be a portrait of Legh himself in the fictitious character of "Panther Herald".

J. P. Cooper described the book as "perhaps the most popular heraldic work of the later 16th-century". Its theories on gentility are based on those of the Boke of St Albans, with minor modifications; the consequence being that "highly restrictive definitions of gentility and right to bear arms without foundation in common law or long established usage were widely circulated." The work strongly influenced the Workes of Armorie (1572) of John Bossewell.
