= John Borlase =

John Borlase or Borlace may refer to:

- John Borlase (MP) (died 1593), High Sheriff of Buckinghamshire and MP for Knights of Buckinghamshire, 1586
- Sir John Borlase (1576–1648), Lord Justice of Ireland, 1641–43
- Sir John Borlase, 1st Baronet (1619–1672), English Member of Parliament for Chipping Wycombe, 1661–73
- John Borlase (died 1681), MP for Great Marlow 1679 and 1681
- Sir John Borlase, 2nd Baronet (1642–1689), English Member of Parliament for Chipping Wycombe, 1673–85, and Great Marlow, 1685–89
- John Borlase (1667–1754), English Member of Parliament for St Ives, 1705–10

== See also ==
- John Borlase Warren (1753–1822), English admiral, politician and diplomat
- Borlase (disambiguation)
