= Enoder =

5th-century Cornish saint

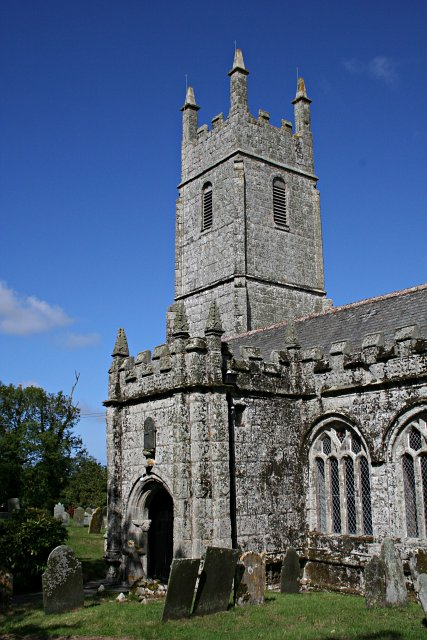
St. Enoder Church

Saint Enoder, (also known as Tenenan, Tinidor and Ternoc) was a 5th-century Cornish saint from Brecknockshire in South Wales. He is venerated in the Church of England and Catholic Church.

He is known to history mostly through the medieval lists of the children of King Brychan of Brycheiniog where he was originally called Wenheden and should not be confused with Saint Enodoc. Today, he is remembered in the name of St Enoder a parish in Cornwall. His Feast day is the last Thursday in April.
