= Demelza =

Hamlet in Cornwall, England

Coordinates: 50.438°N 4.852°W

Demelza: Cornish: Dinmelsa
- Hamlet
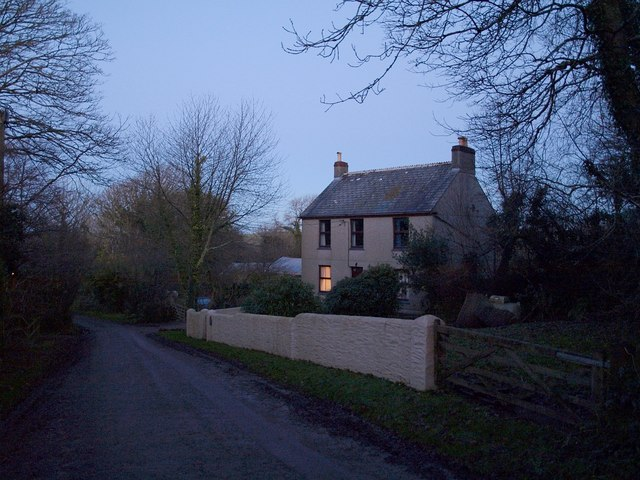
- A house in Demelza

- Location within Cornwall
- Unitary authority: Cornwall
- Region: South West
- Country: England
- Sovereign state: United Kingdom
- Police: Devon and Cornwall
- Fire: Cornwall
- Ambulance: South Western

Demelza (Cornish: Dinmelsa, meaning Melsa's hillfort) is a hamlet in the parish of St Wenn, Cornwall, England, UK, made up of approximately 10 properties. Demelza is situated 1 mile (1.6 km) south-east of St Wenn and is almost equidistant between the North and South coast. It lies at around 114 metres (374 ft) above sea level.

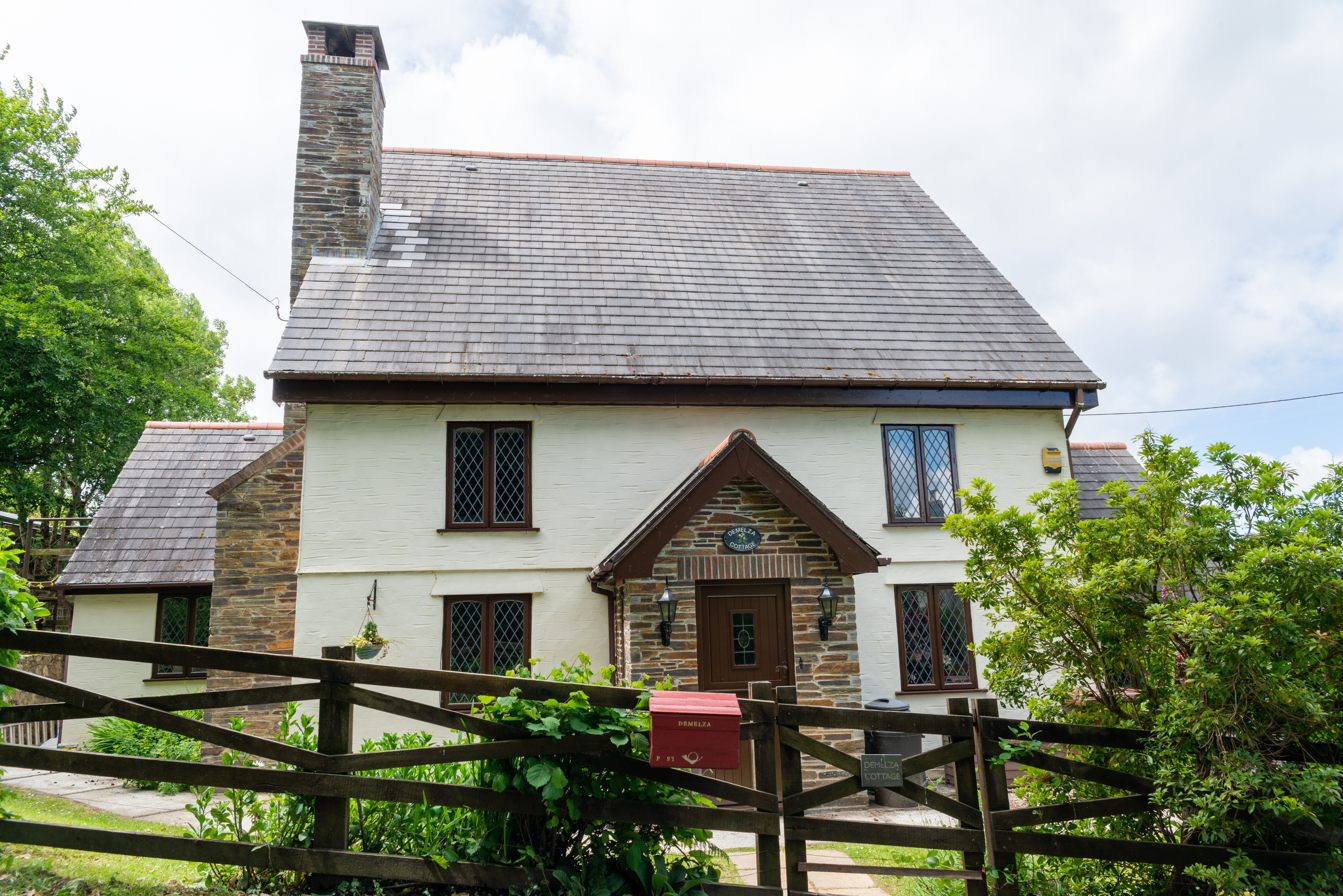
Demelza Cottage a house in Demelza, near St Wenn. Currently run as a Farmstay

The character of Demelza from Winston Graham's Poldark series is named after this hamlet.

The name Demelza is of Cornish origin and is derived from the Cornish "Dinmelsa," which means "fort of Melsa." There are ancient ground works in the area from a hill fort, which is most likely how it received its name.

The area has several small tributaries running to the Camel valley and is characterised by small bridges, woods and naturalised Cornish hedging which comes alive with wild flowers and ferns in spring. Some of the properties still feature water mills that were utilised from these fast flowing tributaries. They also represent boundaries between the parish of St Wenn and its neighbouring parish, Withiel.

Demelza is about one mile from The Saints Way path, which can be picked up at Retire. There is also a footpath which extends through woods and across farmland towards the neighbouring village of Lower Kernick. It is a favoured area for horse riding and cyclists due to its network of quiet lanes, moorland and trails.

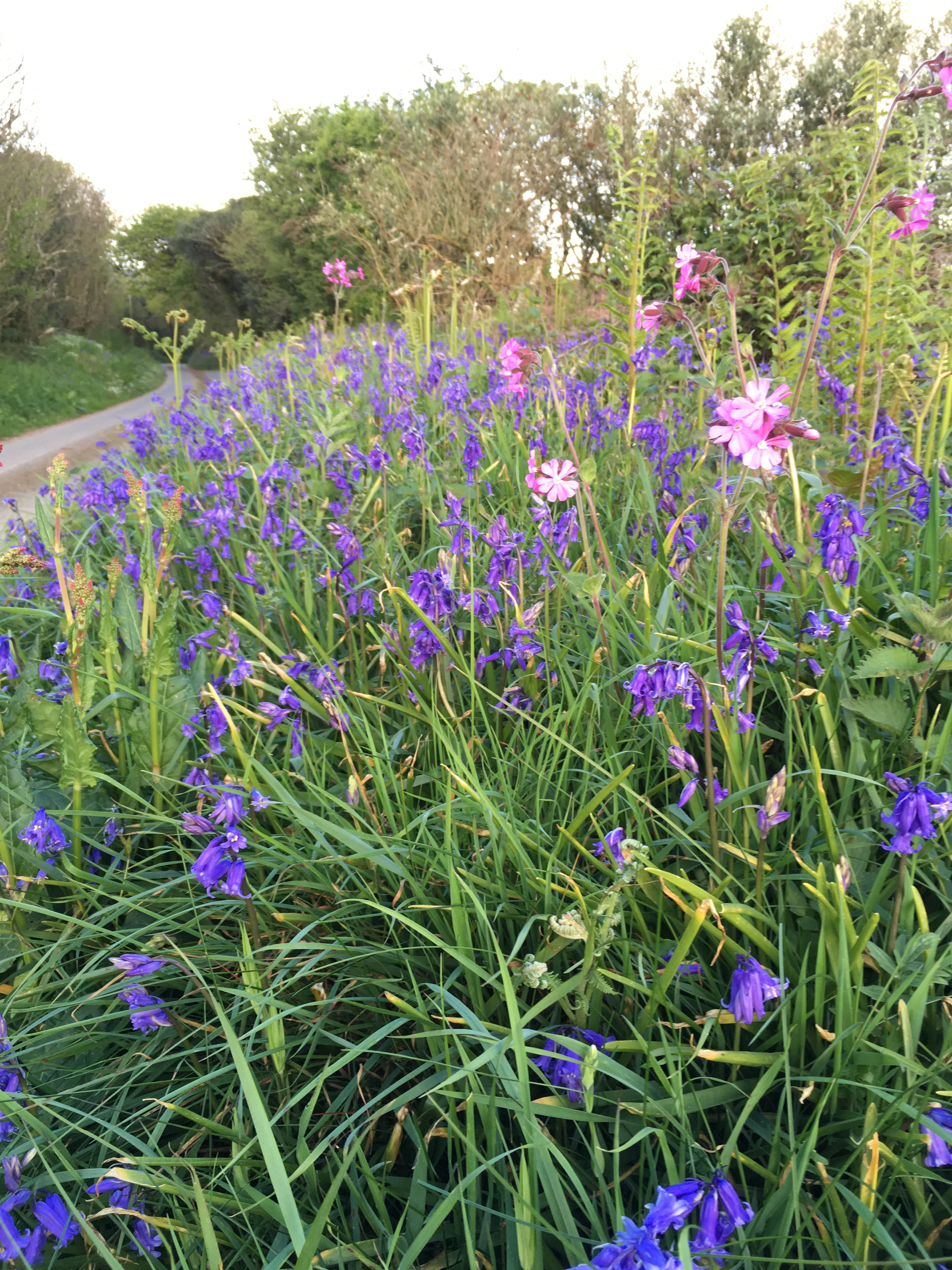
Primroses, violets, bluebells, red campion and ancient ferns adorn the Cornish hedges of Demelza in spring.

The property Henjapel is an old methodist chapel that has been converted into a farming residence.

Rural businesses operating from this area include accommodation providers, biodiversity experts, agriculture, livery, and professional services including financial advisers, interior design, marketing and communications.
