= Tregonetha =

Village in Cornwall, England

Coordinates: 50.4391°N 4.8802°W

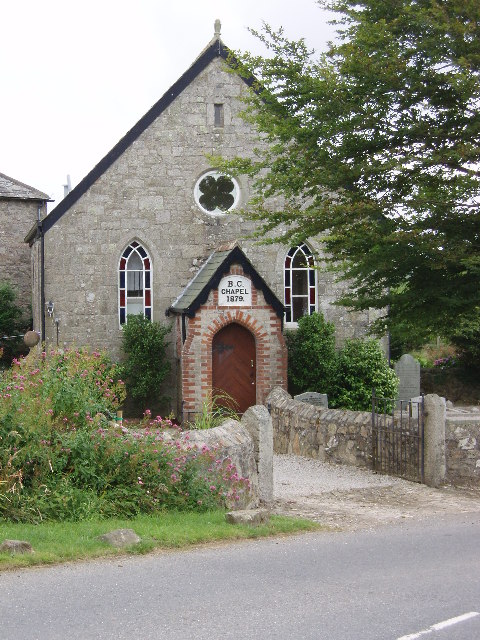
Former Bible Christian chapel at Tregonetha

Tregonetha (Cornish: Tregenheydha) is a village in Cornwall, England, UK. It is located in the civil parish of St Wenn, 7 miles (11 km) west of the town of Bodmin.

Tregonetha Downs is situated half a mile south of the village and forms part of the Tregonetha & Belowda Downs SSSI (Site of Special Scientific Interest).
