= Brychan =

Welsh king and saint

Saint Brychan Brycheiniog
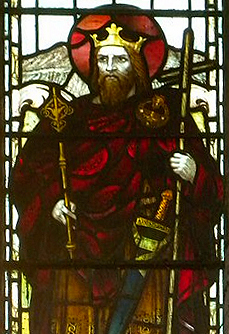
- Brychan depicted in a window of the church in Brecon, Wales
- Born: c. 400 AD; Talgarth, Wales
- Died: c. 480 AD (aged 80)
- Venerated in: Wales, Cornwall
- Feast: April 6

Brychan ap Anlach of Brycheiniog was a legendary 5th-century king of Brycheiniog (Brecknockshire, alternatively Breconshire) in Mid Wales.

== Name variations ==
Brychan had Irish and Greek ancestry. He came from Ireland to Wales, therefore his original name was likely to have been Irish prior to his being called Brychan which is of Welsh etymology. In some sources he is called Brocanus which is the Latinized version of the Irish name Broccan. He is also sometimes referred to as Braccan, Brachan, Brecin and Breccan.

== Life ==
According to Celtic hagiography Brychan was born in Ireland, the son of a Prince Anlach Goronog mac Cormach, son of King Cormach mac Urb, and his wife, Marchel verch Tewdrig ap Teithfal, heiress of the Welsh kingdom of Garthmadrun (Brycheiniog), which the couple later inherited. Upon his father's death, he returned to Garthmadrun and changed its name to Brycheiniog.

Brychan mother's ancestry is traced back to a certain "Annun the Black, king of the Greeks", however this Greek connection isn't adequately explained in Welsh sources. This ancestry has been compared with the much more extensive and complicated Irish legendary material surrounding a figure called "Agnoman/Agnon of the Greeks".

Brychan's name may be a Welsh version of the Irish name Broccán and that of his grandfather Coronac may represent Cormac. Brychan's education was entrusted to one Drichan.

The Life of St. Cadoc by Lifris (c. 1100) portrays Brychan fighting Arthur, Cai and Bedwyr because of King Gwynllyw of Gwynllwg's abduction of his daughter St. Gwladys from his court in Talgarth.

== Portraiture and veneration ==
He is occasionally described as an undocumented saint but the traditional literature does not call him a saint, referring to him as a patriarch instead, and he has no churches named for him. A 15th-century stained glass window in the parish church at St Neot in Cornwall, supposedly depicts Brychan, seated and crowned, holding in his arms eleven children. This, however, has been described by a standard modern guide as "God with Souls in his lap". He is given a saint day on 6 April.

== Children of Brychan ==
According to Christian tradition, Brychan was married three times – to Prawst ferch Tydwal, Banhadlwedd ferch Banadi, and Gwladys – and had a very large family. These wives are mentioned in several manuscripts, including those by William Worcester, John Leland, and Nicholas Roscarrock. The number of children attributed to him varies from twelve to sixty-three, the number most frequently encountered being twenty-four. There are two main lists however, one of Welsh origin and one of Cornish origin. Most of his children appear to have travelled from Brecon to evangelise Cornwall and North Devon, where they are now venerated, but there is little agreement between the two lists.

The number of Brychan's children may have grown over time, as more and more secular people as well as saints wished to claim descent from one of the "Holy Families of Britain". Listed below are children from Welsh, Cornish, Irish, and Breton sources:

=== Sons in Welsh sources ===
The sons listed in the Cognacio Brychan, De Situ Brecheniauc and the genealogies of Jesus College MS 20 are Cynog, Rhain Dremrudd, Clydwyn, Arthen, Papai, Dingad, Berwyn and Rhydog. Also listed, but not in all three, are Cynon, Pasgen, Cylflifer, Marthaerun and Rhun. Other Welsh sources claim the following additional sons: Caian, Cynbryd, Cynfran, Cynin, Dogfan, Dyfnan, Dyfrig, Hychan, Llecheu, Neffei, Rhawin, Llofan, Llonio, Heilin, Afallach and Gwynnws.

=== Daughters in Welsh sources ===
The De Situ Brecheniauc lists: Meleri, Hunydd, Gwladys, Ceingar, Tudglid, Nyfain, Gwawr, Marchell, Lluan, Gwrygon Goddeu, Arianwen, Bethan, Ceinwen (Keyne), Cerddych, Clydai, Cynheiddon (identified with Saint Endelienta), Dwynwen, Eiliwedd, Goleudydd, Gwen, Lludd, Tudful, Tudwystl and Tybie. Other Welsh sources claim the following additional daughters: Beiol (Bilo), Tydieu, Eufail, Hawystl, Edwen, Gwenrhiw, Tudwen, Callwen, Gwenfyl, Gwennan and Mwynwen. An Irish scource claimed another daughter, Saint Almeda, the fourth of Brychan's daughters.

=== Descendants in Cornish sources ===
Listed in the Life of Saint Nectan are, by his wife, Gwladys:
Adwen, Canauc (Cynog), Cleder (Clether), Dilic (Illick), Endelient (Endelienta), Helie, Johannes (Sion), Iona, Julitta (Ilud), Kenhender (Cynidr), Keri (Curig), Mabon (Mabyn), Menfre (Menefrewy), Merewenne (Marwenna), Morewenna (Morwenna), Nectanus (Nectan), Tamalanc, Tedda (Tetha), Wencu (Gwencuff, Gwengustle, name of Saint Nennocha), Wenheden (Enoder), Wenna (Gwen), Wensent, Wynup (Gwenabwy) and Yse (Issey).

Of the holy children that settled in Cornwall, the following gave their names to Cornish churches and villages:

1. Adwen at Advent
2. Cleder at St Clether
3. Dilic at Landulph
4. Endelient at St Endellion
5. Enoder at St Enoder
6. Gwenep at Gwennap
7. Helie at Egloshayle
8. Julitta at St Juliot
9. Keri at Egloskerry
10. Keyne at St Keyne
11. Mabon at St Mabyn
12. Menfre at St Minver
13. Merewenne at Marhamchurch
14. Morwenna at Morwenstow
15. Nectan at St. Nectan's Glen
16. Tethe at St Teath
17. Wenna at St Wenn
18. Yse at St Issey

=== Holy wells associate with Brychan's children ===
Their have been around twenty differing holy wells in Wales and Cornwall that have been identified as being associated with Brychan’s children. The saints linked to them include Cynog, Tydfil, Dwynwen, Dogfan, Nectan, Morwenna, Endelienta, Keyne, Mabyn and Wenna.

Map displaying the location of known Holy wells correlating to the children of Brychan

Such wells were visited for water, prayer and healing, and many became closely connected with the saints whose names they carried. Because the tradition attributes a large number of children to Brychan, further wells may once have been associated with the family. Some may have been lost through changes to the landscape, building work or neglect, others may survive under different names, and some may no longer be recognised as holy wells.

=== Irish sources ===
The Book of Leinster lists the following sons by Brychan's wife, Dína daughter of the King of the Saxons: Mo-Goróc, Mo-Chonóc (Cynog), Diraid, Dubán (Dyfnan), Cairinne (Caian), Cairpre, Iast, Ellóc (Dilic), Paan, Cáemán and Mo-Beóc.

=== Breton sources ===
Breton tradition says that Brychan married Menedoc daughter of Constantine, King of the Scots. Together they were the parents of Saint Nennocha.
