= Belowda =

Belowda: Cornish: Boslowsa
- Location within Cornwall
- OS grid reference: SW9661
- Shire county: Cornwall
- Region: South West
- Country: England
- Sovereign state: United Kingdom
- Police: Devon and Cornwall
- Fire: Cornwall
- Ambulance: South Western

Belowda (Cornish: Boslowsa) is a village in Cornwall, England, UK. The village is just north of the A30 trunk road, about seven miles west-southwest of Bodmin. The village also gives its name to the nearby Belowda Beacon. It is in the civil parish of Roche.

== Mines ==
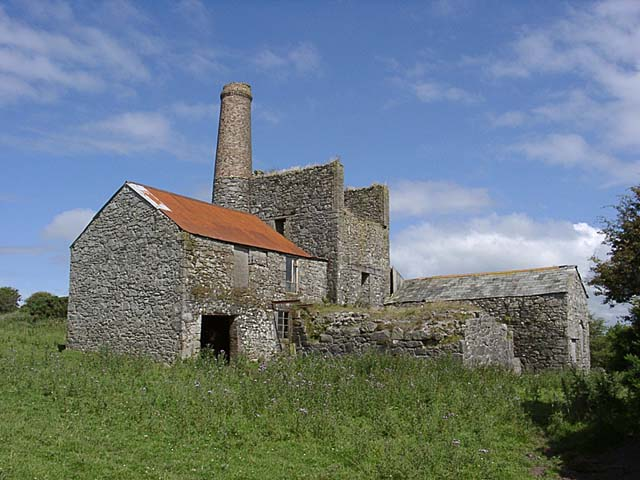
Belowda Beacon south shaft engine house 50.424°N 4.859°W

There are two mineral lodes on Belowda beacon, Wheal Dora Lode, and Webbs Lode. Both lodes converge to meet at the summit of the hill (744 ft) where they were worked open cast. A shaft 500yds NE of Belowda village, on Wheal Dora is near the southern margin of the granite outcrop; and another, 140 yds SSW of the former, is in killas. The main shaft on Webb's Lode is on the granite margin, 550 yds N by W of Lane End farm and there are two others at 80yds SSE, respectively of the main shaft. Though the mine was active until 1902. There are no plans of the underground workings.

== Belowda Beacon ==
Belowda Beacon was designated a Site of Special Scientific Interest (SSSI) in 1996. The description and reasons given by English Nature are as follows: This site shows superb development of minerals formed by late granitic fractionation and boron-fluorine metasomatism in a differentiate of the Belowda coarse megacrystic biotite granite boss. A short shallow adit driven westward as part of a larger stockwork tin mine exposes in its walls a topaz-tourmaline-quartz rock. The level is now collapsed, but exposes are still visible. Small overgrown dumps at the mouth of the adit also contains large pieces of the topaz and quartz with nests of finely developed tourmaline crystals. Topaz may form up to 80% of the rock. Rarely, small yellowish euhedral topaz crystals are present in cavities, the maximum size being 1 cm (the largest recorded in England) The occurrence is very unusual and considerable mineralogical interest.

The downs around the beacon, as well as the downs around Tregonetha form the Tregonetha & Belowda Downs SSSI, noted for its biological interest and biodiversity.
