= Tangwystl ach Brychan =

5th-century saint

Personal life
- Flourished: 5th century
- Spouse: Tydanwedd ap Amlawdd Wledig
- Children: Marchell of Dyffryn Clwyd
- Parent: Brychan of Brycheiniog (father)

Religious life
- Religion: Christianity in Wales

Tangwystl (also known as Tanglws, Tudhistil, Tudbistyl, Taghwystyl or Hawystl and sometimes referred to as Hawystl Gloff) was a 5th-century saint, who was the daughter of Brychan of Brycheiniog.

== Early life ==
Tangwystl was one of the 24 daughters of Brychan of Brycheiniog.

== Personal life ==
Tangwystl married Tydanwedd ap Amlawdd Wledig, and she lived in Bangor-on-Dee. She was the mother of Marchell of Dyffryn Clwyd and many other saints.

== Death ==
She lived in Hafod Tangwystl, now called Aberfan, which was a Christian community. They were attacked, and everyone at Hafod Tangwystl was killed, including Tangwystl and her brother, Rhun.

== Dedications ==
There are a number of churches that are dedicated to Tangwystl, including Ystrad Tanglws in Glamorgan and perhaps Llangwestyl, as well as the extinct chapel of Llan Dydystl in Llandeilo Fawr, Carmarthenshire. She was the saint of Capel Tydyst, formerly Merthyr Tudwystl in Llangadog Fawr, Ystrad Tywi.
