= Darryl Borlase =

Australian rules footballer

Personal information
- Full name: Darryl Borlase
- Nickname: Daisy
- Born: 8 November 1958 (age 67)
- Original team: Ceduna
- Position: Defender

Playing career
Years	Club	Games (Goals)
1985–1998	Port Adelaide	246

Representative team honours
Years	Team	Games (Goals)
1993	South Australia	1 (0)

Career highlights
- 4× Port Adelaide premiership player (1992, 1994, 1996, 1998 (SANFL)); Port Adelaide captain (SANFL) (1998); Port Adelaide leading goalkicker (1991); Port Adelaide most dedicated player (1992)

Darryl Borlase (born 8 November 1958) is a former Australian rules footballer who played for the Port Adelaide Football Club.

== Football ==
Borlase was recruited by Port Adelaide from the Ceduna Football Club. He debuted for Port Adelaide in 1985 in the South Australian National Football League (SANFL) and played three games in his first season. He became a regular, first choice senior player the following year. He struggled with injury and form during the late 1980s and early 1990s. He watched from the sidelines as the Magpies procured a hat trick of premierships between 1988 and 1990. He returned in 1991 and was the club's leading goalkicker with 25 goals. In 1992, he was a key contributor to the Magpies' premiership. He was also key in their further premiership triumphs in 1994 and 1996, but missed the club's 1995 premiership after suffering a knee injury during the finals series. Borlase skippered the Magpies in his final league season in 1998, where the team won another SANFL premiership.

== Agriculture ==
As of 2018, Borlase was employed by Archer Daniel Midland. He is an experienced agribusiness executive, having obtained a Graduate Diploma in Agricultural Business and an Associate Diploma of Agricultural Science from the University of Adelaide. In 2002, he was working in Egypt as a commodity trader.

== Personal life ==
Borlase's wife, Jenny Borlase, is an Australian former netball player. The couple have three children, including footballer James Borlase and basketball player Isobel Borlase.
