= Endelient =

Cornish saint

Saint Endelienta
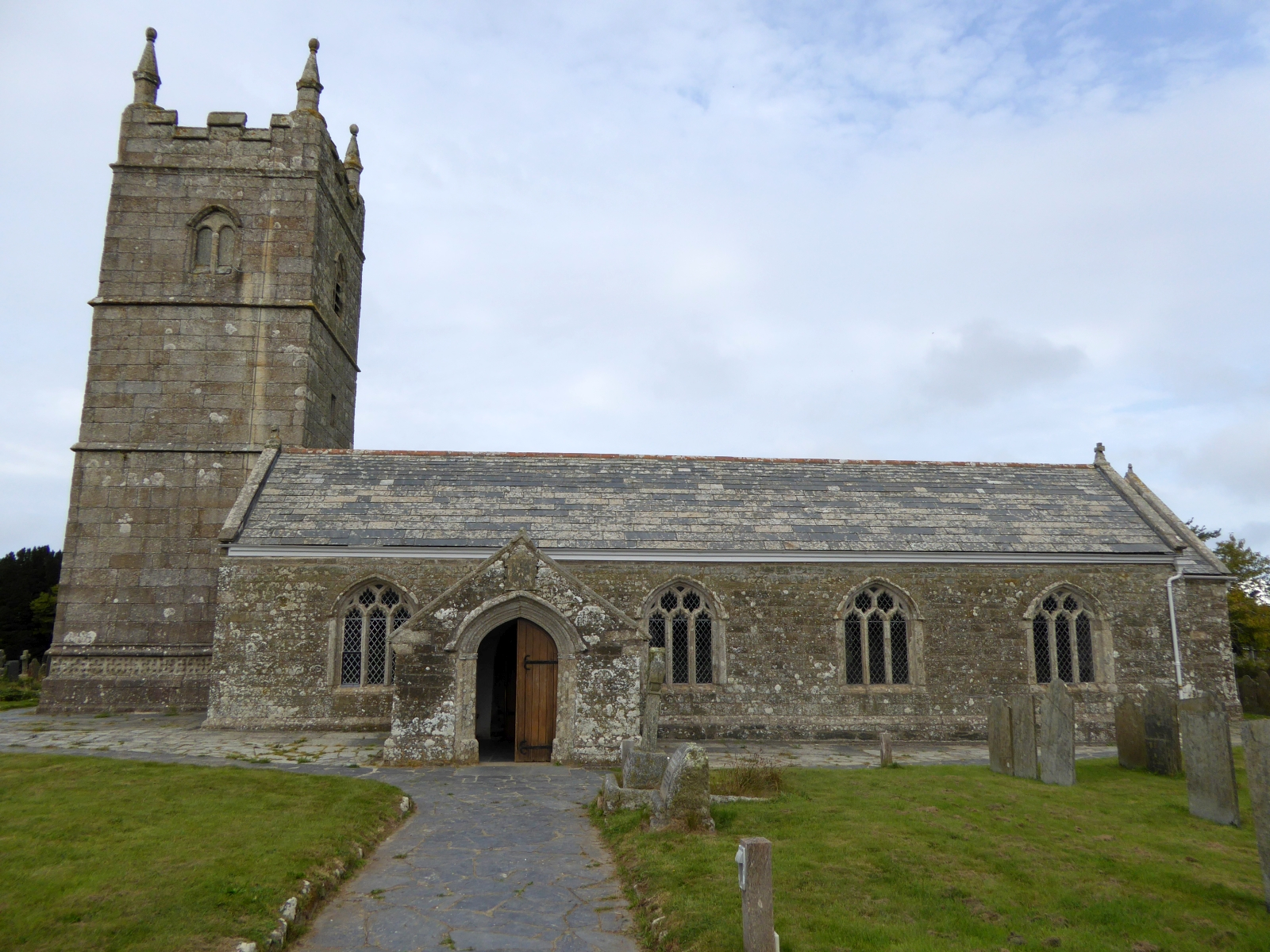
- The Collegiate Church of St Endellion, patronal church of St Endelienta
- Born: c. 470 AD; South Wales
- Died: unknown Cornwall
- Venerated in: Roman Catholicism, Anglicanism, Orthodoxy
- Major shrine: St Endellion, Cornwall, England
- Feast: 29 April

Endelient (also Endelienta, Edellienta or Endellion) was a Cornish saint of the 5th and 6th century. She is believed to be a daughter of the Welsh King Brychan, and a native of South Wales who travelled to North Cornwall to join her siblings in converting the locals to Christianity. Legend says that she was a goddaughter of King Arthur, and that she lived as a hermit at Trentinney where she subsisted on the milk of a cow. The saint is commemorated in the church and village of St Endellion which bear her name; Endellion being an Anglicised version of her name. Her feast day is 29 April.

== Life ==
Tradition makes her a daughter of King Brychan, of Brycheiniog in South Wales. The village of Saint Endellion in Cornwall, named after her, is from where she is said to have evangelized the local population. Two former wells near the village were named after her.

She is called "Cenheidlon" in Welsh records, with Endelienta being a Latinised form of the name. Her feast day is 29 April. The saint is believed to have been a native of South Wales who crossed the Bristol Channel to join her siblings in converting the people of North Cornwall to Christianity. During her journey, she initially landed on the island of Lundy, where she is believed to have founded a small chapel, which would later be wrongly rededicated to Saint Helen. She subsequently moved on to the mainland where she stayed with her brother, Saint Nectan, at Hartland, before eventually choosing to settle at Trentinney, south-west of the present day village of St Endellion, although she would return to Lundy from time to time on retreat for meditation.

She lived at Trentinney as a hermit, where legend says that she subsisted solely on the milk of a cow, and the water from two nearby wells. Her sister, St Dilic (whose church is at Landulph), settled nearby and the two would often meet along a certain path whose grass would ever afterwards grow greener than elsewhere.

The cow was killed by the Lord of Trentinney after straying onto his land. He in turn is said to have been killed by Endelienta's Godfather, reputed to be King Arthur, after Arthur was angered by the deed and sent his men to exact revenge. However, Endelienta was said to be unhappy that Trentinney had been killed in her name, and restored the nobleman back to life.

Following a vision of her death, the saint is said to have asked that upon her death, her body should be placed on a sledge or cart drawn by bullocks, and that she should be buried at the place where they stopped. She is thought to have died on 29 April some time in the 6th century, and possibly at the hands of Saxon pirates. She was buried at the top of a hill, and a church built over her grave. The present church at St Endellion stands on that site.

== Legacy ==
According to local folklorist Nicholas Roscarrock, a chapel dedicated to Saint Endelienta survived on the site of her hermitage at Trenteney until the 16th century, while her shrine at the Church of St Endellion was a site of pilgrimage throughout the Middle Ages. It was virtually destroyed during the Reformation, but the base survives to the present day and can still be viewed.

The St Endellion Music Festivals take place at Easter and in the Summer every year in the St Endellion church.

Endellion is depicted in the Langdale rosary, a 16th Century work believed to have belonged to Lord William Howard; it is now in the Victoria and Albert Museum.

In 2005 a local iconographer was commissioned to produce an icon of Saint Endelienta, even though there were no known images of her on which to base the work.

On 25 August 2010 it was announced that British Prime Minister, David Cameron, and his wife Samantha had named their newborn daughter Florence Rose Endellion after the village of St Endellion, reflecting the fact she was born while the Cameron family were holidaying in Cornwall.
