= John Bossewell =

English heraldic writer

John Bossewell (died 1580) was an English heraldic writer.

== Life ==
Bossewell was, on his own account, from the north of England, and a gentleman. He appears to have acted as a notary public.

== Works ==
As an antiquary devoted to heraldic study, Bossewell was a close follower of Gerard Legh. The first edition of his Workes of Armorie was published by Richard Totell in 1572, with a reprint in 1597. The first part, entitled "Concordes", is an abridgement of Legh's Accedens of Armory. Like Legh, he covered symbolism and allegory, conceits and fables.

== Notes ==
Attribution

This article incorporates text from a publication now in the public domain: Stephen, Leslie, ed. (1886). "Bossewell, John". Dictionary of National Biography. Vol. 5. London: Smith, Elder & Co.
