= William Borlase (disambiguation) =

William Borlase (1696–1772) was a Cornish clergyman, antiquary, geologist and naturalist.

William Borlase may also refer to:

- Sir William Borlase (died 1629) (c. 1564–1629), English politician and Member of Parliament
- William Borlase (died 1630) (c. 1588–1630), English politician and Member of Parliament
- William Borlase (died 1665) (1620–1665), English politician and Member of Parliament
- William Copeland Borlase (1848–1899), English antiquarian and Member of Parliament

== See also ==
- Sir William Borlase's Grammar School, Buckinghamshire, England, established by the William Borlase who died in 1629
