= Menefrida =

5th century Cornish saint

Saint Menefrida
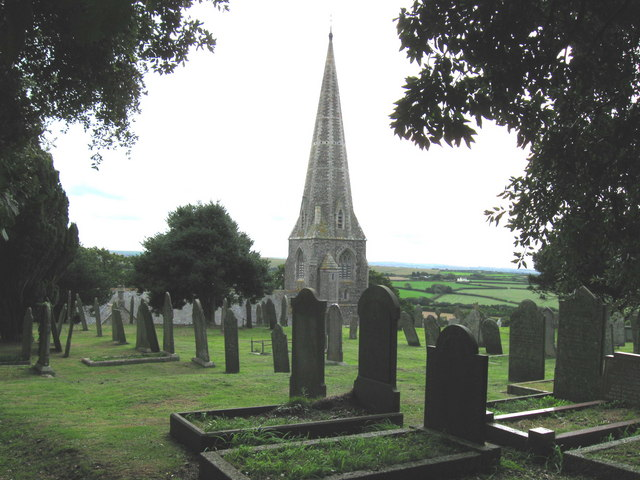
- St Menefrida's Church, St Minver
- Born: 5th century Wales
- Died: 5th century
- Honored in: Church of England; Roman Catholic Church; Eastern Orthodox Church
- Feast: 24 July
- Patronage: St Minver

Menefrida is the 5th-century AD Cornish saint associated with the parish of St Minver, near the Camel estuary in Cornwall, England. Alternative spellings of her name include Menefreda, Menwreda, Menfre, Mynfreda and Minefreda. At the time of King Henry VIII the parish was known as St. Menifryde.

Menefrida was one of the many children of the Welsh king Brychan, and has been referred to as a saint since at least 1256. William of Worcester records, Sancta Menefrida, virgo non martir, die 24 Novembris ("Saint Menefrida, virgin, not a martyr, 24 November"), which he copied from a calendar at Bodmin into the notes made during his travels around Britain during the late 15th century. Her feast day is 24 July.

The church dedicated to St. Menefrida in St Minver is a stone building in the Transitional Norman and Early English styles.
