= James Borlase =

Australian football league player

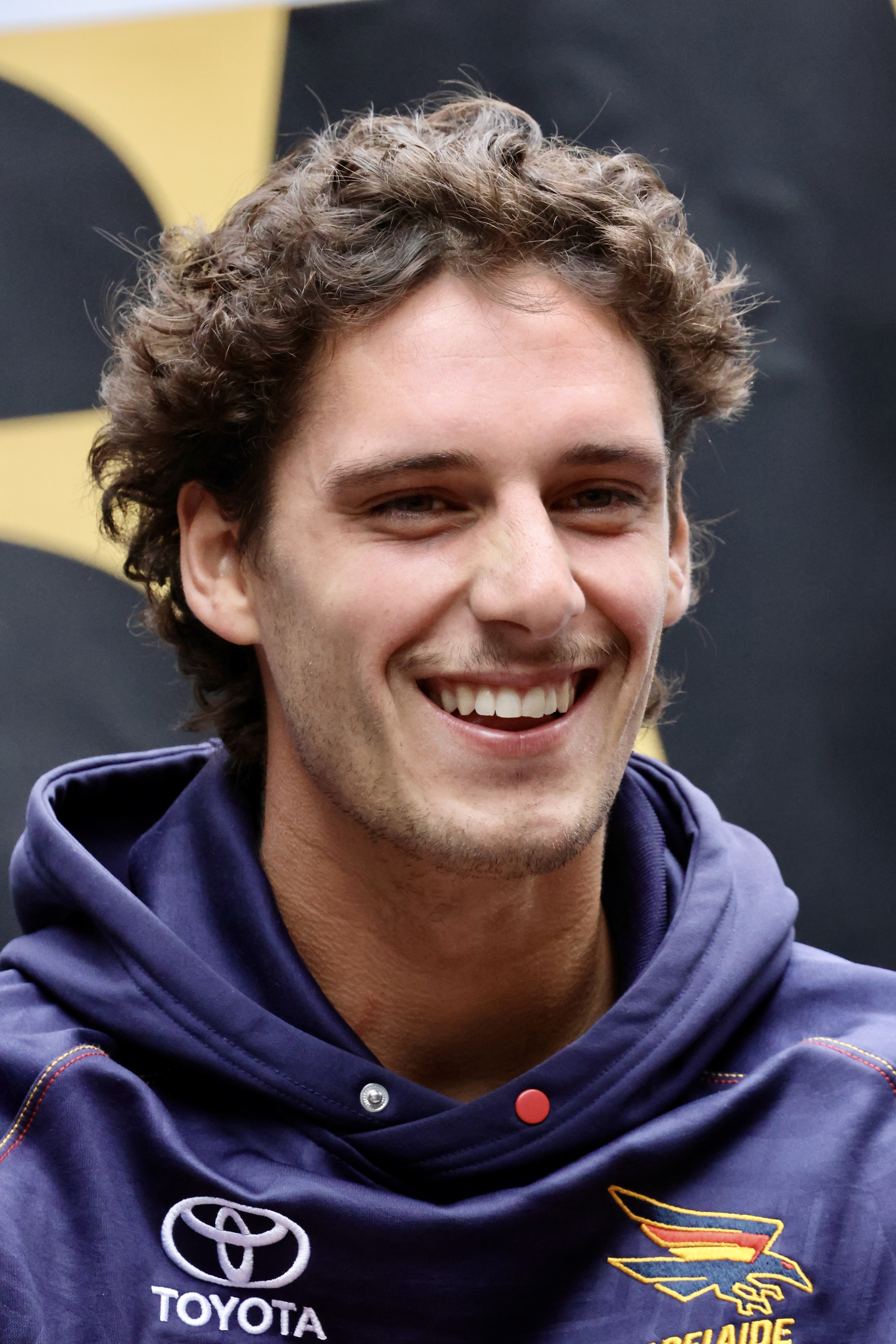
- Borlase at the 2026 Gather Round

Personal information
- Nickname: Boz
- Born: 18 July 2002 (age 24); Cairo, Egypt
- Original team: Sturt (SANFL)
- Debut: Round 21, Adelaide vs. Gold Coast, at Adelaide Oval
- Height: 192 cm (6 ft 4 in)
- Weight: 101 kg (223 lb)
- Position: Defender

Club information
- Current club: Adelaide
- Number: 35

Playing career^{1}
Years	Club	Games (Goals)
2021–	Adelaide	35 (1)
- ^{1} Playing statistics correct to the end of 2026.

James Borlase (born 18 July 2002) is a professional Australian rules footballer who plays for the Adelaide Crows in the Australian Football League (AFL). He was drafted by the Crows as a category B rookie in 2020 and made his AFL debut in 2023.

== Early life ==
Borlase was born in Cairo, Egypt, while his father worked as a commodity trader abroad. The Borlase family moved to Melbourne several months after he was born and relocated to Adelaide around four years later, settling in the suburb of Netherby.

Borlase played junior football for the Unley Jets. He made the under-15 All-Australian team and played in the under-17 futures game at the MCG on 2019 AFL Grand Final day.

In 2020, Borlase made his senior debut for Sturt in the South Australian National Football League (SANFL). He also earned best on ground honours in Prince Alfred College's 2020 All Schools Cup grand final victory.

== AFL career ==
In December 2020, Borlase was drafted by the Adelaide Crows as a category B rookie from the club's Next Generation Academy. Although his father Darryl played 246 games for Port Adelaide in the SANFL, Borlase was ineligible to be a Port Adelaide father-son prospect because Darryl fell short of the required minimum of 200 matches before the club's Australian Football League (AFL) entry in 1997. In 2021, Borlase finished runner-up in Adelaide's SANFL Club Champion Award.

In 2023, Borlase played 14 games for Adelaide in the SANFL where he averaged 13.6 disposals and six marks per game. He made his AFL debut in round 21 of the 2023 season and played the final four games of the season after the Crows' key defensive stocks were hit hard through injury to finish the year. Following the season, he was delisted and then redrafted by the Crows as a rookie.

Borlase played 10 AFL games for Adelaide in the 2024 season. The club was impressed with Borlase's resilience and discipline to his craft, having to bide his time before he could get an opportunity. Following the season, he was re-signed by Adelaide until the end of 2026.

He was recalled early in 2026 to replace the concussed Jordon Butts. Borlase impressed across his first two games, curtailing star forwards Josh Treacy and Harry McKay, holding the latter to just one goal during Gather Round.

== Personal life ==
Borlase is the son of Darryl Borlase and Jenny Borlase. His father played Australian rules football for the Port Adelaide Football Club while his mother played for the Australian netball team. His older sister, Ella, has represented Australia in surfboat rowing while his younger sister, Isobel, is a basketball player drafted by the Atlanta Dream in the 2024 WNBA draft. As of 2020, his grandfather lived on the Eyre Peninsula.

== Statistics ==
Updated to the end of round 22, 2026.

Legend
G	Goals	K	Kicks	D	Disposals	T	Tackles
B	Behinds	H	Handballs	M	Marks

Season	Team	No.	Games	Totals							Averages (per game)							Votes
Season	Team	No.	Games	G	B	K	H	D	M	T	G	B	K	H	D	M	T	Votes
2021	Adelaide	35	0	—	—	—	—	—	—	—	—	—	—	—	—	—	—	0
2022	Adelaide	35	0	—	—	—	—	—	—	—	—	—	—	—	—	—	—	0
2023	Adelaide	35	4	0	0	20	12	32	15	7	0.0	0.0	5.0	3.0	8.0	3.8	1.8	0
2024	Adelaide	35	10	1	1	60	45	105	46	16	0.1	0.1	6.0	4.5	10.5	4.6	1.6	0
2025	Adelaide	35	2	0	0	10	6	16	3	3	0.0	0.0	5.0	3.0	8.0	1.5	1.5	0
2026	Adelaide	35	15	0	1	100	65	165	61	22	0.0	0.1	6.7	4.3	11.0	4.1	1.5	0
Career			31	1	2	190	128	318	125	48	0.0	0.1	6.1	4.1	10.3	4.0	1.5	0
