= Ninnoc =

Breton abbess and saint

Saint Ninnoc
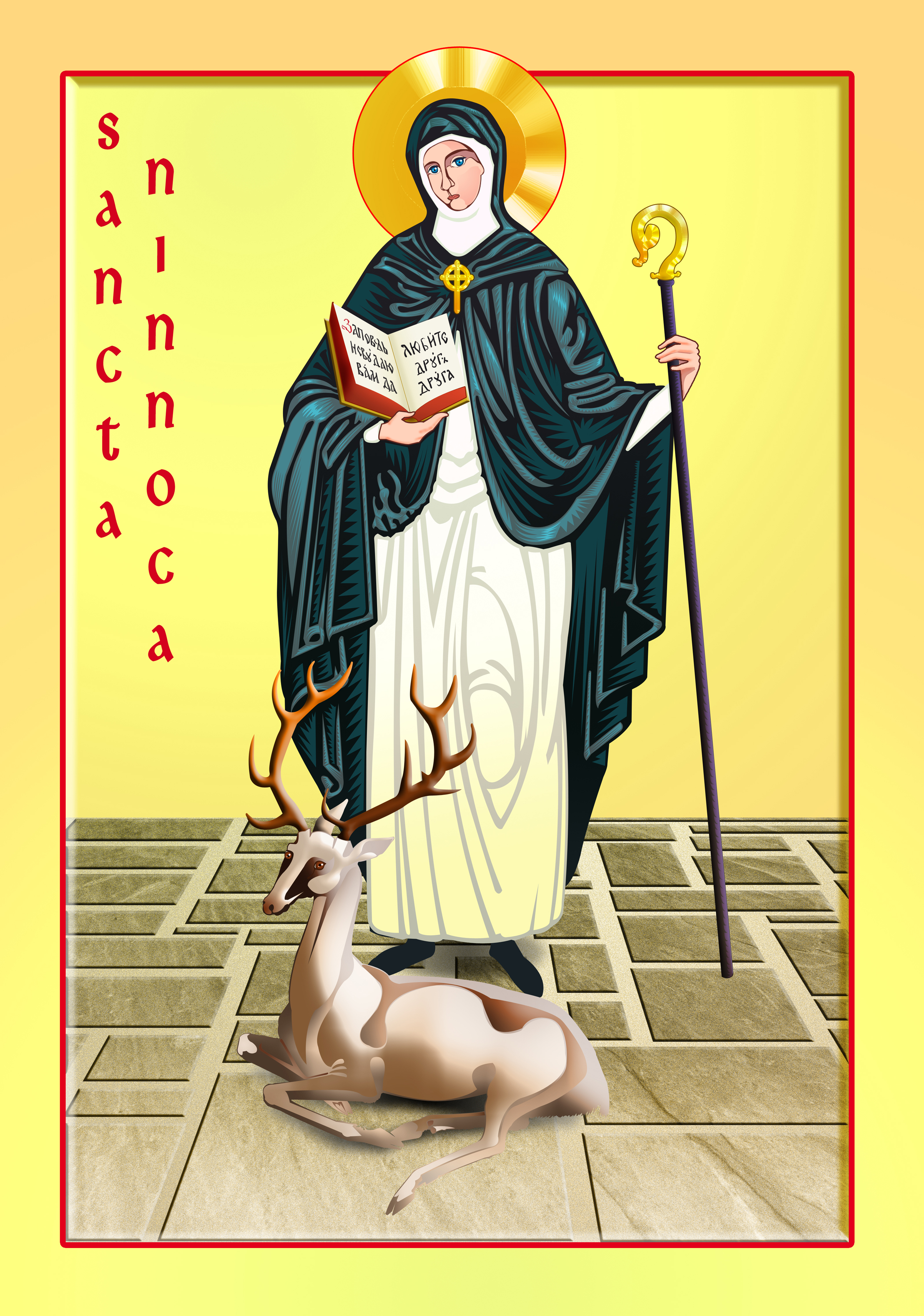

Virgin, Abbess
- Born: c. 414; Wales
- Died: 4 June 467 (aged 52–53); Lannenec Monastery, Ploemeur, France
- Venerated in: Catholic Church
- Canonized: Pre-Congregation
- Feast: 4 June
- Attributes: Religious habit Crosier; Book; Deer
- Patronage: Agriculture; Forestry; Women

Saint Ninnoc or Ninnog of Breton (c. 414 – c. 4 June 467 (Note: Ninnocs's year of birth is estimated by subtracting the 38 years she supposedly lived in Brittany, as well as subtracting the supposed age of 15 years that she arrived there, from 467. This gives an estimate of c.414.)), also known as Nenooc, Nennoca, Nennocha, Ninnoc, Ninnocha, and Gwengustle, was an early medieval abbess born in Wales who died in Brittany. The text of Vita Sanctae Ninnocae (The Life of Saint Ninnoc), preserved in the Cartulary of Quimperlé, provides knowledge of her life and work.

== Biography ==
According to the Vita Sanctae Ninnocae, which was written c. 1130 and is preserved in the Cartulaire de l'abbaye de Sainte-Croix de Quimperlé (fr), St Ninnoc was born in Wales and her father was King Brychan and her mother Meneduc. They had 14 sons, all of whom left their parents' home after they were inspired to become missionaries. Brychan and Meneduc prayed, promising a tenth of all their possessions to the church if they were granted a child who could inherit. This child was Ninnoc, who was sent to live with her godparents soon after her birth.

When Ninnoc was 15, a Scottish prince asked to marry her. Ninnoc, who had recently met and heard the preaching of Germanus, a disciple of St Patrick, instead wanted to devote herself to God, and after Germanus's intervention, her father granted her wish and sent her to Brittany with a "ship, money and attendants".

In Brittany she was welcomed by King Gueric of the Bretons and was granted a settlement on the southern coast of Brittany, where she founded a religious house and became its abbess. The house was a double monastery for men and women. The establishment became known as Lannennoc after her: the suffix "-nennoc" is said to derive from Ninnoc. She taught new agricultural techniques to the local Breton communities, as well as encouraging tree planting so they could better support themselves. Abused women found shelter at Lanennoc and Ninnoc became known as a protector of women.

Ninnoc lived at her monastery for approximately 38 years until her death. The book Les petits Bollandistes vies des saints de l'Ancien et du Nouveau gives Ninnoc's year of death as 467, after a short illness. This date, combined with her feast day of 4 June, has become her reported date of death. Since there is doubt over the veracity of the Vitae, these dates are not certain.

It has been proposed that Ninnoc's double-house at Lannénec near Ploemeur was destroyed by Vikings in the 9th or 10th century. The church was rebuilt in the 12th century, but no trace of the earlier building remains.

== Veneration ==
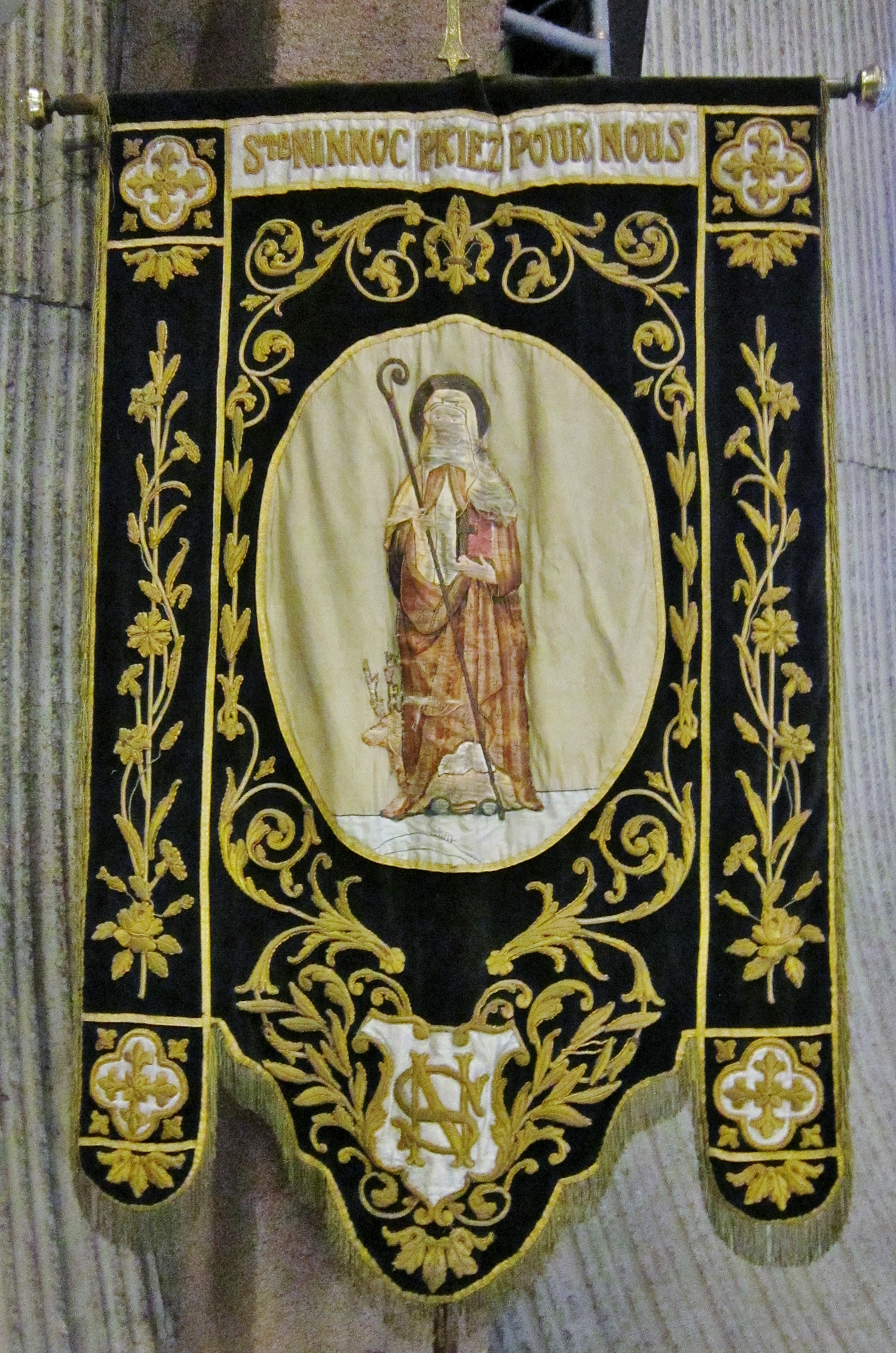
Processional banner of St Ninnoc, Ploemeur

=== Feast days ===
The feast of St Ninnoc, Virgin and Abbess, is celebrated on 4 June in Brittany. In Ireland, a Saint Ninne (of whom there is no record) is remembered on 3 June, and it has been suggested by the historian Sabine Baring-Gould that she is connected to Ninnoc's cult.

=== Iconography ===
Artistic representations of her often show a stag at her feet, which could represent the vulnerable women who came under her guardianship. This may also refer to a story from her Vitae in which a stag, being hunted by King Gueric, came into the church for shelter and laid at Ninnoc's feet— on seeing this Gueric stayed at the church for seven days praying, and afterward granted the settlement more land, 300 horses and more cattle. There are accounts of the veneration of St Ninnoc in the 7th and 8th centuries in England.

=== Canonization ===
Miracles were attributed to Ninnoc during her lifetime and, according to her Vitae, she was canonised a few years after her death.

== Historiography ==
St Ninnoc is not mentioned in any contemporary sources and her Vitae was recorded in the 12th century, almost 700 years after she lived, and existing scholarship dates to the 19th and early 20th centuries. In Lives of the British Saints, Baring-Gould points out several inconsistencies between her Vitae and other documentary evidence. Baring-Gould also refutes the idea that it was St Germanus of Auxerre who preached to Ninnoc, as repeated by Dunbar in A Dictionary of Saintly Women. Confusion between a Germanus and St Germanus is repeated in some modern sources.

Whilst Wales is generally accepted as her place of birth, Scotland or Cumbria have both been suggested. Some sources also place Ninnoc's life in the 8th century. Others consider her a Cornish saint.

=== Vita Sanctae Ninnocae ===
In common with other Vitae, the Life of St Ninnoc is likely to be an exaggerated account of the truth. The production of the Vitae in the 12th century was also a political act, which aimed to legitimise the holdings of the Sainte-Croix Abbey—in this case to assert its rights over the land around Lannennec. This use of her Vitae as a tool for legitimacy is compounded by the fact it is not placed at the start of the cartulary but is in the local property sections. The cartulary does not claim her relics.
