= Rosenannon =

Hamlet in Cornwall, England

Coordinates: 50.4589°N 4.8811°W

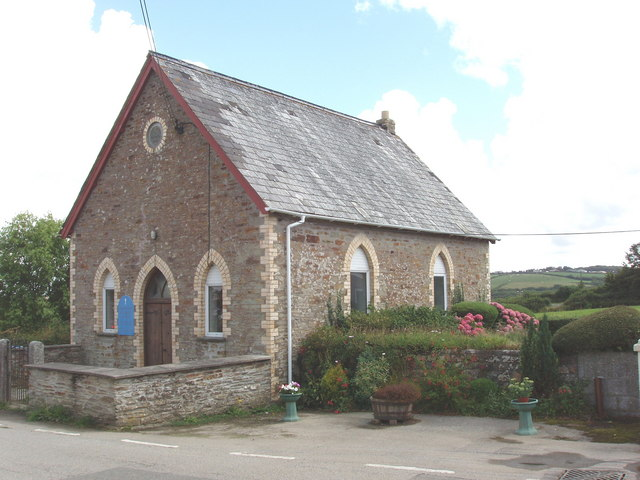
Rosenannon Methodist Church

Rosenannon (Cornish: Ros an Onnen) is a hamlet in Cornwall, England, United Kingdom. It is within the civil parish of St Wenn, 4 miles (6.4 km) south-west of the town of Wadebridge.

Rosenannon Downs is a nature reserve to the north of the hamlet owned and managed by the Cornwall Wildlife Trust.

== History ==
Although there are no listed buildings in Rosenannon village, Borlase Farmhouse and Borlase Burgess Farmhouse which are west of the village, are both Grade II listed.
