= Mabyn =

Medieval Cornish saint

Saint Mabyn
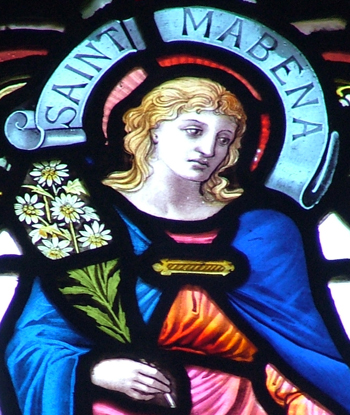
- Venerated in: Roman Catholic Church; Eastern Orthodox Church; Anglican Communion
- Feast: 18 November
- Patronage: St Mabyn

Mabyn, also known as Mabena, Mabon, etc., was a medieval Cornish saint. According to local Cornish tradition she was one of the many children of Brychan, king of Brycheiniog in Wales in the 5th century. The village and civil parish of St Mabyn is named for her, and the local St Mabyn Parish Church is dedicated to her.

== History ==
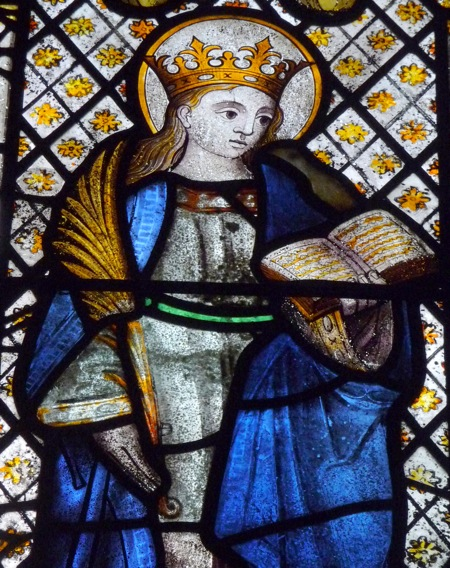
Mabena depicted on the "wives' window" in St Neot Church

The earliest known source to mention Mabyn is the 12th-century Cornish Latin Life of Saint Nectan. She appears in the appended list of the various children of King Brychan of Brycheiniog, which includes Nectan himself and many other saints. Brychan and his saintly children appear earlier in Welsh sources and were known also in Ireland and Brittany, though none of these sources mention Mabyn. The fact that the Life includes Mabyn alongside several other saints with churches dedicated to them in the West Country suggests that St Mabyn Parish Church was already established when the list was written.

There are several later medieval references to Mabyn and her church, but they offer little information about her, and two sources even describe her as a man. Sabine Baring-Gould suggested that the true founder of St Mabyn's Church was actually the male Welsh saint Mabon, supposedly a brother of Saint Teilo and the founder of Llanvabon, and that the attribution to a female Mabyn came about after the true history had been lost. At any rate the associations of Mabyn with the family of Brychan as it appears in the Life of Saint Nectan proved quite strong in Cornish tradition, and apparently survived until at least the 16th century. Nicholas Roscarrock records hearing, from people alive at the time St Mabyn Church was rebuilt around 1500, that at that time a "song or hymn" to Mabyn was sung that corresponded strongly with the list in the Life. He further records her feast day as 18 November.

Mabyn is depicted in a 1523 (or 1528) stained glass window in the local church in the nearby village of St Neot, which lies to the east of the village. The window portrays her wearing robes and a crown, carrying a book and a palm branch, a symbol of martyrdom. She is one of six local Cornish saints to appear in the north-aisle windows, while those of the south aisle were reserved for internationally renowned saints and subjects of a more didactic nature. Five of these six saints used to appear on windows donated by three single-sex associations: the wives of the western part of the parish, the "sisters" (probably unmarried women) and the young men. The wives were the donors of St Mabyn's window, which also features St Meubred of Cardinham.

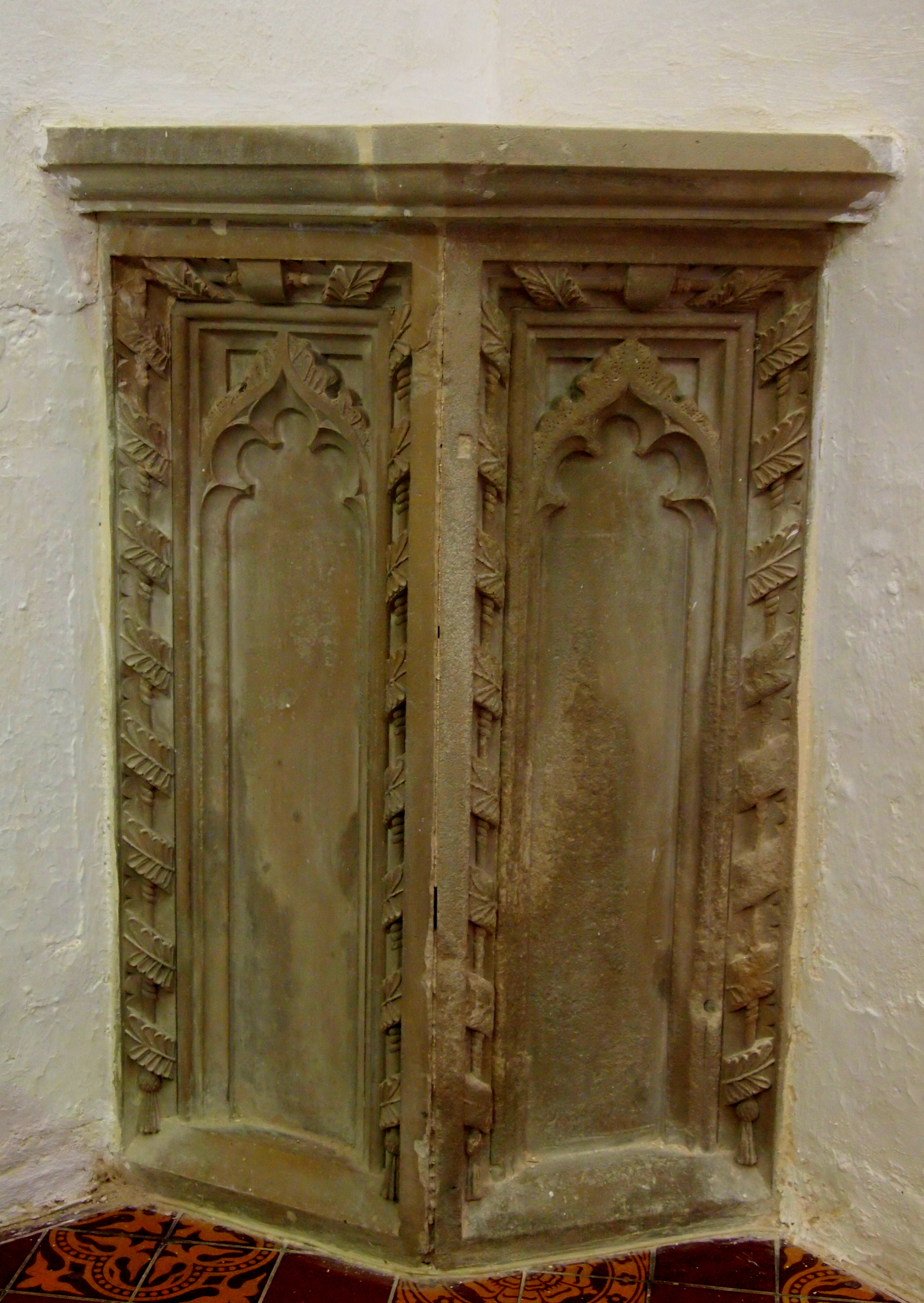
Credence table in St Mabyn Church

A credence table which survives at St Mabyn may originally have been the panel of a tomb raised in Mabyn's honour. It is possible that all her sisters had tombs erected for them.
