= St Wenn =

Village in Cornwall, England

Coordinates: 50.448°N 04.864°W

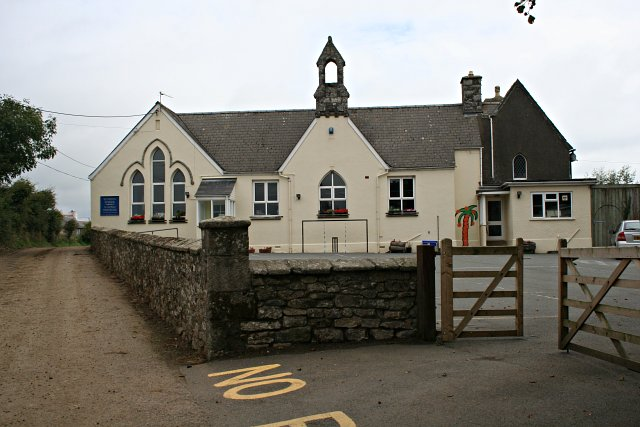
St Wenn Primary School

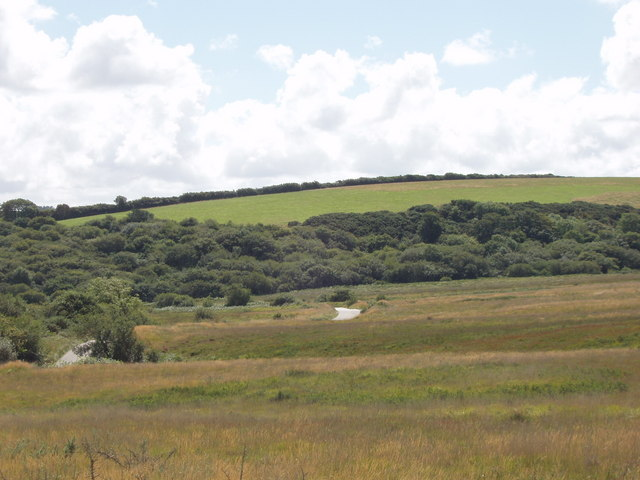
Rosenannon Downs

St Wenn (Cornish: Sen Gwenna) is a civil parish and village in Cornwall, England, United Kingdom. The village is situated six miles (9.7 km) west of Bodmin and nine miles (14 km) east of Newquay. The parish population at the 2011 census was 369.

Other settlements in the parish include Rosenannon, Demelza, Tregonetha (Cornish: Tregenhetho), and Tregurtha Barton, once the home of Michael Tregury, Archbishop of Dublin who died in 1471. The last heir-male of the elder branch of this family died in the reign of Henry V. The Borlase family, ancestors of William Borlase, were residents of three farms in this parish.

== Churches and schools ==
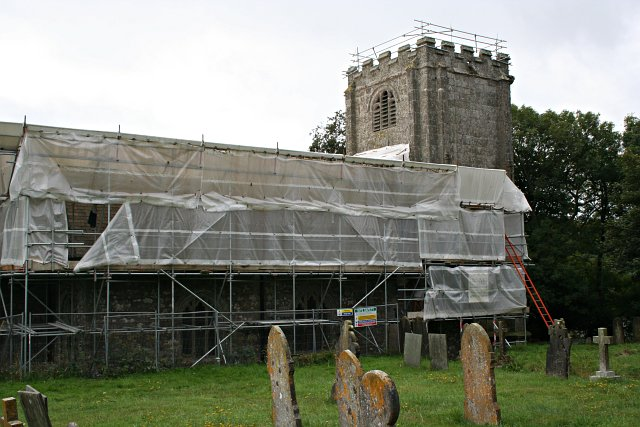
St Wenn Church

The parish church is dedicated to Saint Wenna. The church was in the 12th century in the possession of the Earl of Gloucester who gave it to Tewkesbury Abbey c. 1150. It was appropriated to the abbey in 1242 when the first vicar was instituted. The tower was built with three stages but now has only two as the top section was destroyed by lightning in 1663. There is a nave and two aisles of three bays. The font is 15th century work in the Norman style. and very similar to those of St Columb Minor and Mawgan-in-Pydar.

On the North Downs, called Carenza Wortha, (now called Rosenannon Downs) there used to be a chapel dedicated to St Mary Magdalen: it was destroyed in the English Civil War during the time of Charles I. There is a Methodist chapel at Rosenannon and there used to be others. There is a holy well which is said to be St Wenna's well at Treganetha and at Cransworth there was once a chapel and another well. The holy well is said to be dedicated to Wenna but no specific records corroborate this.

St Wenn School is a primary school in St Wenn village.

== History and antiquities ==
William Hals, who wrote the Parochial History of Cornwall, lived here in the latter part of his life: Hals, who owned the rectorial tithes of St Wenn, died here.

There is a Cornish cross at Cross and Hand, a place in the valley next to Castle-an-Dinas and in the extreme south of the parish. This cross (locally known as Crossy Ann) marks the boundary of the parishes of St Wenn, St Columb Major and Roche.

In July 1940, during World War 2, a bomb was dropped near St Wenn. A small amount of damage was caused to property but nobody was injured.

== Cornish wrestling ==
Cornish wrestling tournaments, for prizes, were held in St Wenn for centuries. Venues for tournaments included Trewollack House

The Chapman family, from St Wenn, is the most famous dynasty in all of Cornish wrestling. They were famous over the last century for producing many champions (of Cornwall, England, South Africa and the United States). The BBC featured them on a documentary in 1971. Examples include:

- Reuben Chaman (1881-1930), known as "Reub", was champion of Cornwall from 1903 to 1910 and in 1914. He also fought and won matches in the US.
- Sidney Chapman (1889-?), won the championship of Cornwall in 1903, 1907, 1912, 1913, 1919 and 1920. He beat Tim Harrington in 1909 and was the middleweight champion of the US in 1910. He was awarded a medal by the Transvaal wrestling association in 1911 for his wrestling in South Africa and was the champion of South Africa in 1911 and 1912. He also fought in Australia.
- Bernard Chapman was middleweight champion from 1937 through to 1946. He was heavyweight champion of the East Cornwall Wrestling Federation (ECWF) from 1934 through to 1938 and again in 1946. He was ECWF middleweight champion from 1934 through to 1938 and again in 1946. He was ECWF lightweight champion in 1934.
- William Chapman was heavyweight champion from 1937 through to 1949 and in 1951 and 1952. He was the heavyweight champion of the ECWF in 1939.
- Charlie Chapman was middleweight champion in 1948, 1949 and 1956 and lightweight champion in 1952 and 1953. He was ECWF middleweight champion in 1939.
- John Chapman was lightweight champion in 1936, 1937, 1939, 1947 through to 1951, 1959, 1960 and 1966 and featherweight champion in 1946. He was ECWF lightweight champion from 1936 through to 1939.
- M J Chapman was featherweight champion in 1929, 1930 and 1932.
- Stuart Chapman was featherweight champion in 1967,
- Reuben Chapman (jnr) was heavyweight champion in 1973 and 1975.

Keith Hawkey from St Wenn was heavyweight champion in 1964, 1965, 1970, 1976 and 1978. He was light heavyweight champion in 1966, 1968, 1969, 1977 and 1978.
