= Nicholas Roscarrock =

English Catholic activist and hagiographer

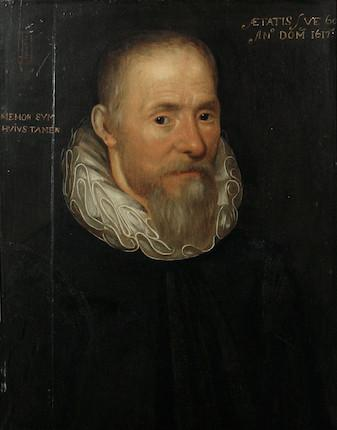
- Born: c. 1549
- Died: c. 1634; Naworth Castle, England
- Occupations: Catholic activist and hagiographer

Nicholas Roscarrock (c. 1549 – c. 1634) was an English Catholic activist and hagiographer.

== Biography ==
Roscarrock was born probably about 1549. He was the fifth son of Richard Roscarrock (1507–1575) of Roscarrock, Cornwall, who was twice sheriff of that county. The father, before his death, settled on Nicholas for life the estates of Penhale, Carbura, and Newton in the parishes of St. Cleer and St. Germans. His mother, Elizabeth, was daughter and heiress of Richard Trevenor. Nicholas probably studied at Exeter College, Oxford (Oxford Reg. ii. 33). He supplicated B.A. on 3 May 1568, and was admitted a student of the Inner Temple in November 1572 (Foster, Alumni Oxon.; Notes and Queries, 5th ser. iv. 102). In the same year he contributed a series of ninety-four verses to Richard Tottell's edition of John Bossewell's "Workes of Armorie," the verses bearing the title "Celenus censure of the Aucthor in his high Court of Herehaultry." The verses signed ‘N. R.’ prefixed to George Gascoigne's "Steele Glas" (1576) are also probably by Roscarrock. Besides being noted "for his industrious delight in matters of history and antiquity" (Carew, Survey of Cornwall, p. 299), he was an ardent catholic. On 16 September 1577 he was accused at Launceston assizes of not going to church (Morris, Troubles of our Catholic Forefathers, p. 95), and in April 1580 he was watched by Cecil as a suspected person (Cal. State Papers, Dom. Eliz. cxxxvii. 7, 3 April 1580). He was then a member of a young men's club in London to help priests, and George Gilbert, "a great patron of the catholics," often stayed with him. On 1 September 1580 he landed at Douay with one Creswell, possibly Joseph Creswell ("Duo nobiles … ex Anglia," Douay Diaries, p. 169), and on the 12th set out for Rome (ib.) Towards the end of 1580 he was again in England. Spies were employed to catch him, and on 5 December 1580 he was lodged in the Tower (Rishton's "Diary" in Sanders's De Origine Schimatis Anglicani; Douay Diaries, p. 178). On the following 14 January he was racked (Dodd, ed. Tierney, iii. 151, 152). He continued in prison in the Tower for several years (being "in the Martin Tower," with William Crichton the Scottish jesuit, in 1586). On 6 March 1586 Sir Owen Hopton, lieutenant-governor of the Tower, petitioned for his release, apparently with success (Hatfield MSS. iv. 432). In 1594 he was again in the Fleet. In June 1599 a true bill was found against him at the Middlesex sessions for not going to church. He was then described as of St. Clement Danes, esquire (Middlesex County Records, i. 254).

Roscarrock wrote a letter—Cotton MS. Julius c. v. f. 77—to William Camden on 7 August 1607 on the publication of Camden's "Britannia" (Camdeni Epistolæ, pp. 90–2). From 1607 onwards Roscarrock lived at Naworth Castle, possibly as tutor to Lord William Howard's sons (Household Book of Lord Howard, Surtees Soc. pp. 6, 303, 451, 505). In later life his sight seems to have failed. He died at Naworth Castle in 1633 or 1634.

Roscarrock wrote a dictionary of British and Irish saints that was never published during his lifetime. In 1992, the 235-page Nicholas Roscarrock's Lives of the Saints, edited by Nicholas Orme, was published for the first time.

David McKie wrote about Roscarrock in the 15 May 2004 edition of The Guardian.
