= Cyfyw =

English Roman Catholic saint

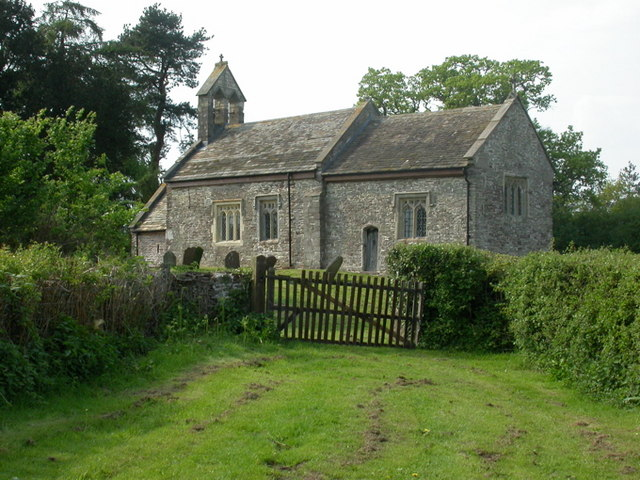
St. David's Church, Llangeview.

Cyfyw was a 6th-century princess and pre-congregational Saint of Cornwall and Wales. Cyfyw is a patron of Llangyfyw (Llangeview).

== Life ==
Cyfyw was born to Saint Gwynllyw and his wife Gwladys. She was the sister of St. Cadoc Cynidr and Maches.

St David's Church, Llangeview was originally dedicated to Saint Cyfyw and now bears a commemoration.
