= Gwladys =

Welsh queen and saint

Saint Gwladys
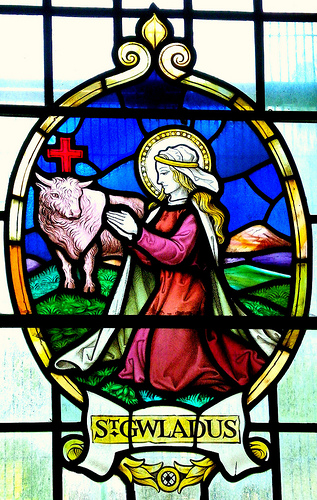
- St Gwladus in stained glass

Queen
- Born: traditionally Brycheiniog
- Died: c. 500 or 523
- Venerated in: Roman Catholic Church; Anglican Communion
- Major shrine: Pencarn Hermitage, Bassaleg (destroyed)
- Feast: 29 March
- Patronage: Newport; Gelligaer
- Controversy: place of death (see text)

Saint Gwladys ferch Brychan (Welsh: [ˈɡwlaːdɪs]) or St Gladys (Latin: Gladusa), daughter of King Brychan of Brycheiniog, was the queen of the saint-king Gwynllyw Milwr and the mother of Cadoc "the Wise", whose Vita may be the earliest saint's life to mention Arthur. Gwladys's other children were Cynidr, Bugi, Cyfyw, Maches, Glywys II and Egwine. Today her main church and associated school is in Bargoed.

== Traditional history ==
The medieval lives of Cadoc (by Lifris c. 1086) and of Gwynllyw (c. 1120) preserve different legendary details of Gwladys. Among the best attested of all of Brychan's half-Irish saintly children, she is also mentioned in Welsh king-lists.

Both saint's lives agree that Gwladys, daughter of Brychan married Gwynllyw and gave birth to Cadoc. In the Life of Saint Gwynllyw, the king is just and fair and the marriage is accomplished peacefully, while the tale of Glwadys' marriage in Lifris' work seems similar to abduction stories in other saints' lives as well as in other Arthurian stories, which may suggest that it is myth rather than history. Here, when her father refused to allow their marriage, Gwynllyw, accompanied by 300 men, abducted her from Talgarth. A pitched battle occurred which was only stopped by the intervention of King Arthur and Cai and Bedwyr who supported Gwynllyw and his warband in the battle. This act only occurred after Cai managed to persuade Arthur not to abduct the beautiful Gwladys himself.

However, both lives agree that Gwynllyw later became a hermit and local saint. It was the prompting of Cadoc and Gwladys that led Gwynllyw to abandon his life of violence and seek forgiveness for his sins. A vision led him to found a hermitage on what is now Stow Hill in Newport, South Wales. Gwladys accompanied Gwynllyw into a hermits life and for a while they lived together there fasting or on a vegetarian diet and bathing in the cold waters of the Usk but moved apart to avoid temptation: Gwladys founded a hermitage at Pencarn in Bassaleg, supposedly at Pont Ebbw, where there is a supposed grave and where she is said to have bathed in the Ebbw River, though Cadoc's life says that she later moved to Capel Wladus in Gelligaer. The Lady's Well at Tredegar may also have been dedicated to her and so, it has been suggested, once was St. Basil's, Bassaleg. There are also sites at the abandoned settlement of Pencarn itself and the nearby area of Coedkernew that also could be significant.
