= Egwine =

English Roman Catholic saint

Egwine was a 6th-century Celtic princess and saint, who is a patron saint of the village of Llanigon, east of Hay-on-Wye, in the Wye Valley of Wales.

Very little is known of her life. She was the sister of saints Cadoc, Maches and Cyndr, who all built churches in the same area.

She was also the daughter of Gwladys, and granddaughter of king Brychan of Brycheiniog.
