= Kenderchurch =

Village in Herefordshire, England

Coordinates: 51.9508°N 2.8702°W

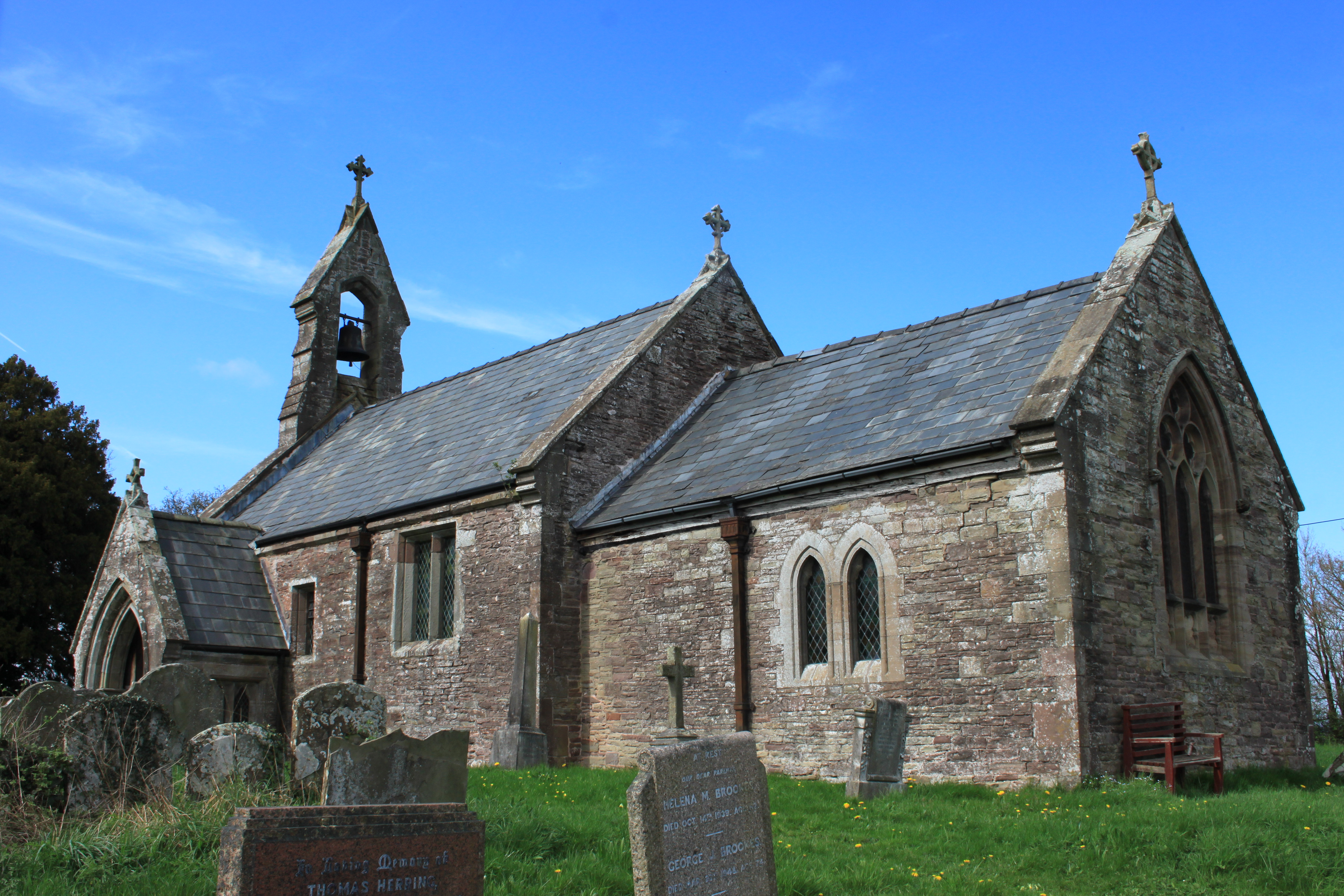
- St Mary's Church

- Location within Herefordshire
- Population: 98 (2001 census)
- Civil parish: Kilpeck
- Unitary authority: County of Herefordshire
- Ceremonial county: Herefordshire
- Region: West Midlands
- Country: England
- Sovereign state: United Kingdom

Kenderchurch is a village and former civil parish, now in the parish of Kilpeck, in the county of Herefordshire, England. In 2001 the parish had a population of 98. On 1 April 2019 the parishes of Kenderchurch, St Devereux, Treville and Wormbridge were merged with Kilpeck.

St Mary's Church is a Grade II listed building. Much of the church was rebuilt by William Chick of Hereford in 1870–72, but it retains many older features. It came into the care of the Friends of Friendless Churches in October 2023. The site is associated with the 6th-century Welsh saint Cynidr.
