= St Mary's Church, Kenderchurch =

Church of St Mary, Kenderchurch
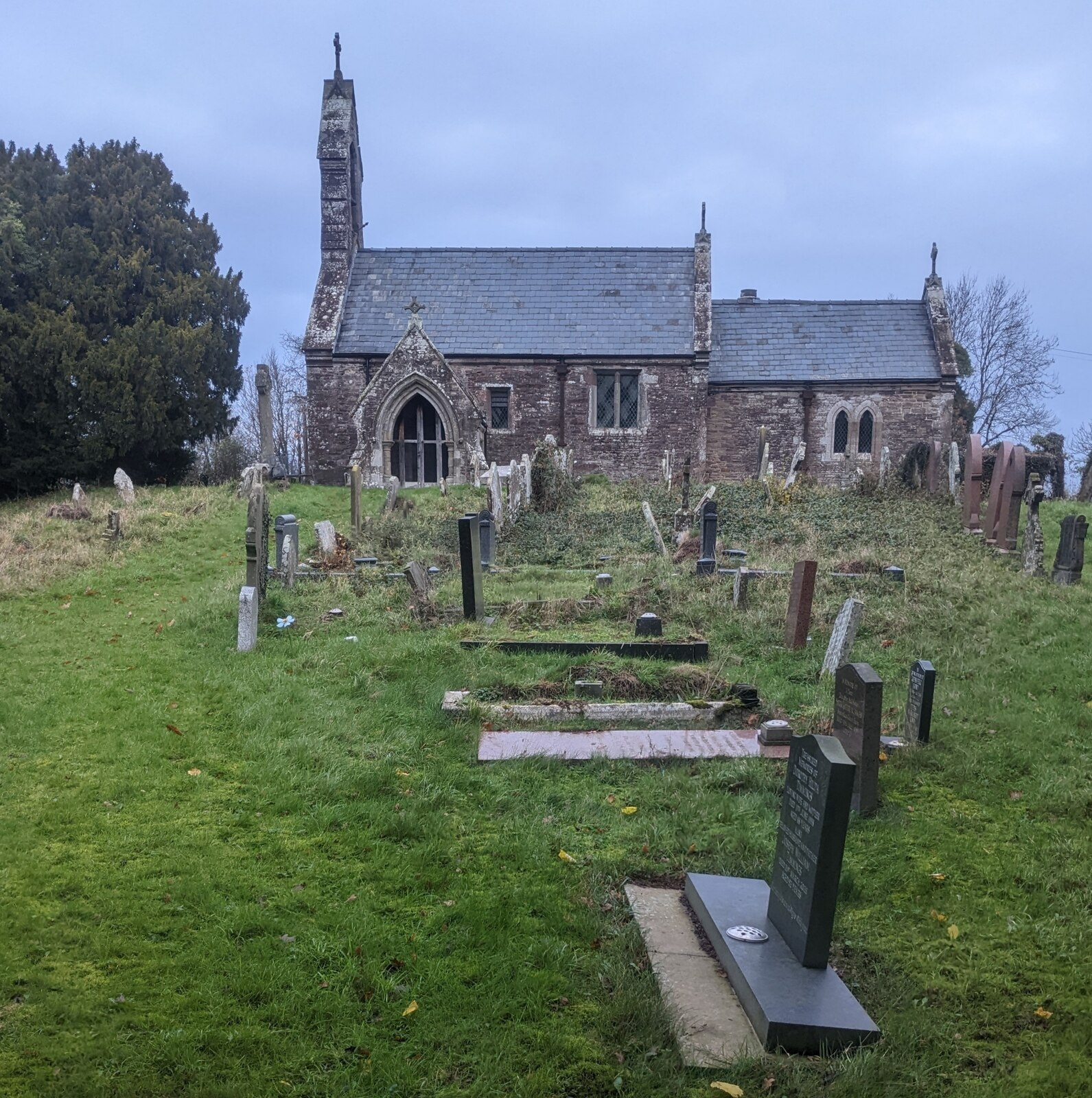

- Location in Herefordshire
- 51.9509°N 2.8702°W
- Location: Kenderchurch, Herefordshire, England

History
- Built: 12th century

Site notes
- Restored: 1870–71
- Restored by: William Chick
- Governing body: Friends of Friendless Churches

Listed Building – Grade II
- Official name: Church of St Mary, Kenderchurch
- Designated: 26 January 1967
- Reference no.: 1099612

Listed Building – Grade II
- Official name: Base of Churchyard Cross 2M south-west of the Church of St Mary
- Designated: 20 May 1987
- Reference no.: 1099613

St Mary's is a redundant church in the hamlet of Kenderchurch to the north of the village of Pontrilas, in Herefordshire, England (grid reference SO402284). It is recorded in the National Heritage List for England as a designated Grade II listed building and is under the care of the Friends of Friendless Churches.

== History ==
The church is, by tradition, linked with Cynidr, a 6th century Welsh saint, and the first bishop of Glasbury in Powys. There is no architectural evidence for this, but traces of a Norman structure do remain, including the font. (Note: Brooks suggests that Chick's restoration may have removed an original Norman tympanum.) The chancel roof is medieval in date. Little else of medieval date remains, following a whole-scale Victorian restoration by William Chick of Hereford in 1870-1871. (Note: William Chick is also recorded as having responsibility for the restoration of St Mary's Church, Pembridge.) (Note: Debate among conservationists, archaeologists and architectural historians as to the full extent of Chick's restoration continues. Writing in 1963, Nikolaus Pevsner, in his Herefordshire volume in the Buildings of England series, wrote; "Of ancient features the restoration of 1871 has left hardly anything". In his revision to the guide, published in 2012, Alan Brooks slightly tempered Pevsner's original judgement; describing the building as "almost entirely rebuilt". Recent investigations suggest that more may remain of the medieval building than was earlier thought.)

The church continued in use until closure in 2013. Attempts to sell it for conversion to a private home were unsuccessful and after a decade of non-use the building came into the care of the Friends of Friendless Churches in 2023. In 2025, the Friends secured funding for a £500,000 restoration, including a substantial donation from Pontrilas Saw Mill which stands adjacent to the church.

== Architecture and description ==
St Mary's is a relatively small church, and is constructed to a simple plan, with a nave, chancel, and porch, and terminating with a bellcote. The building materials are sandstone rubble with stone dressings and a roof of Welsh slate. The interior contains some stained glass which was probably manufactured by Clayton and Bell. The church is a Grade II listed building. A cross in the churchyard with a 15th-century base and a 19th-century cross has its own Grade II listing.

== Gallery ==
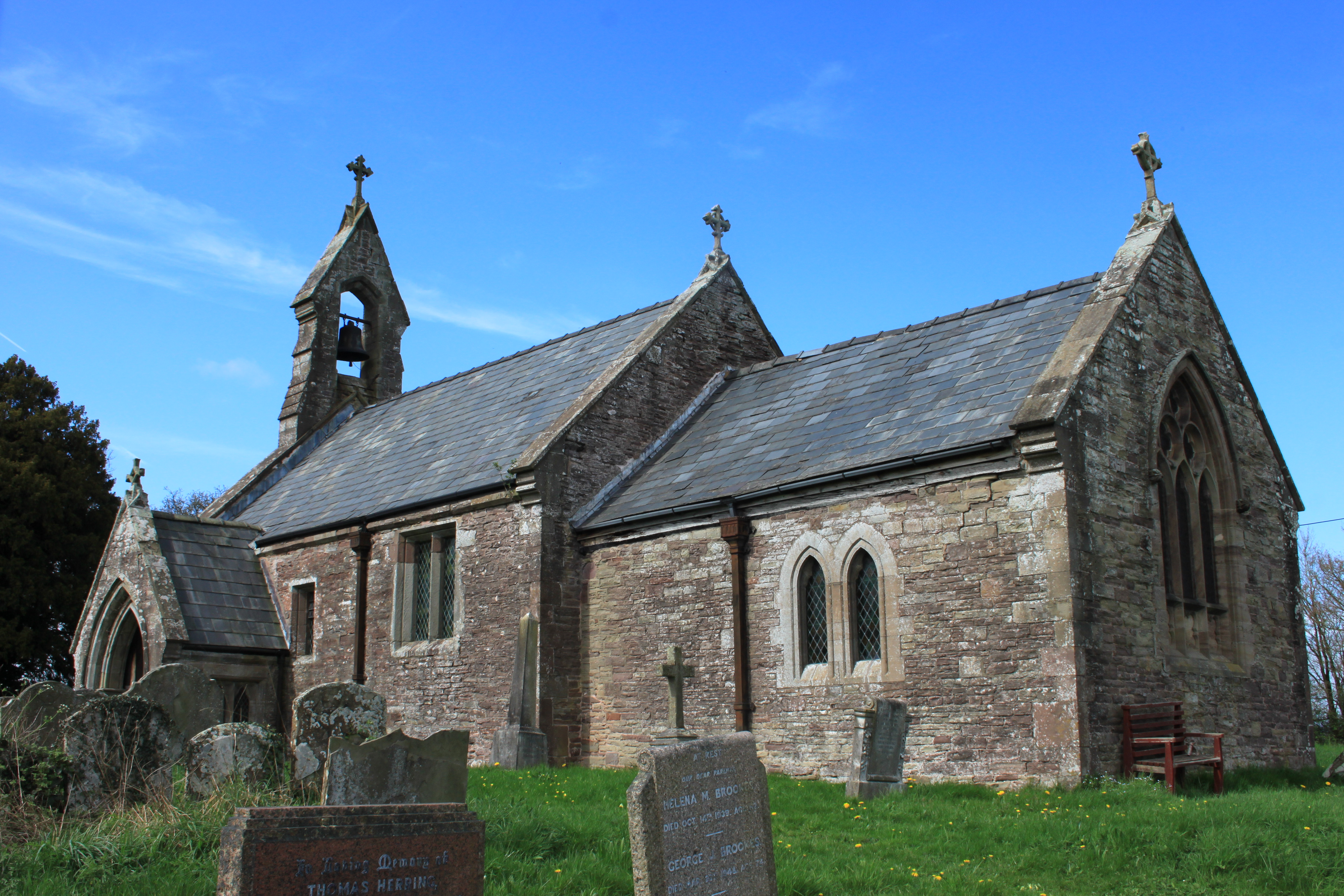
An oblique view

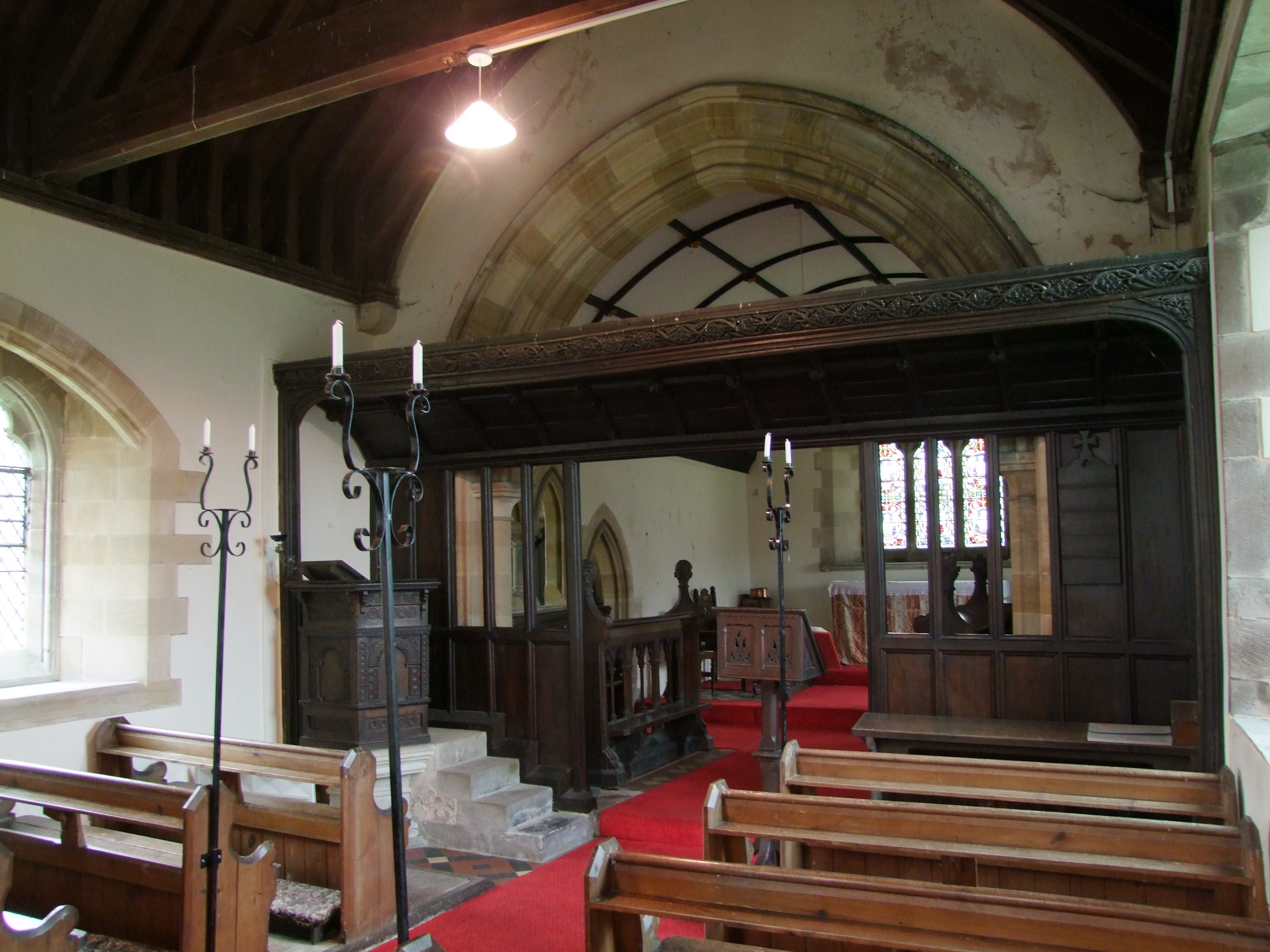
Interior

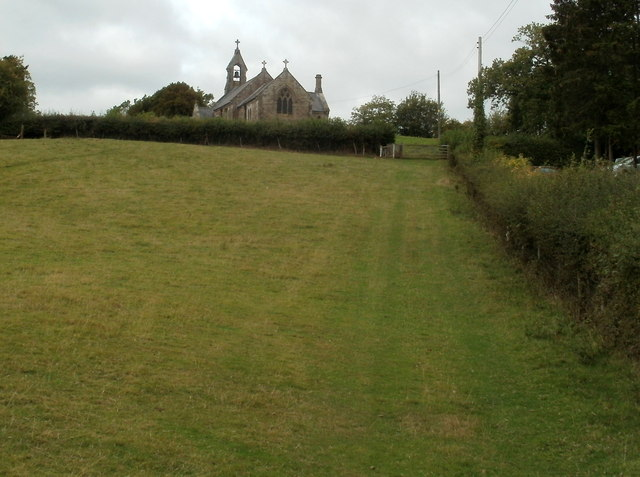
Church setting

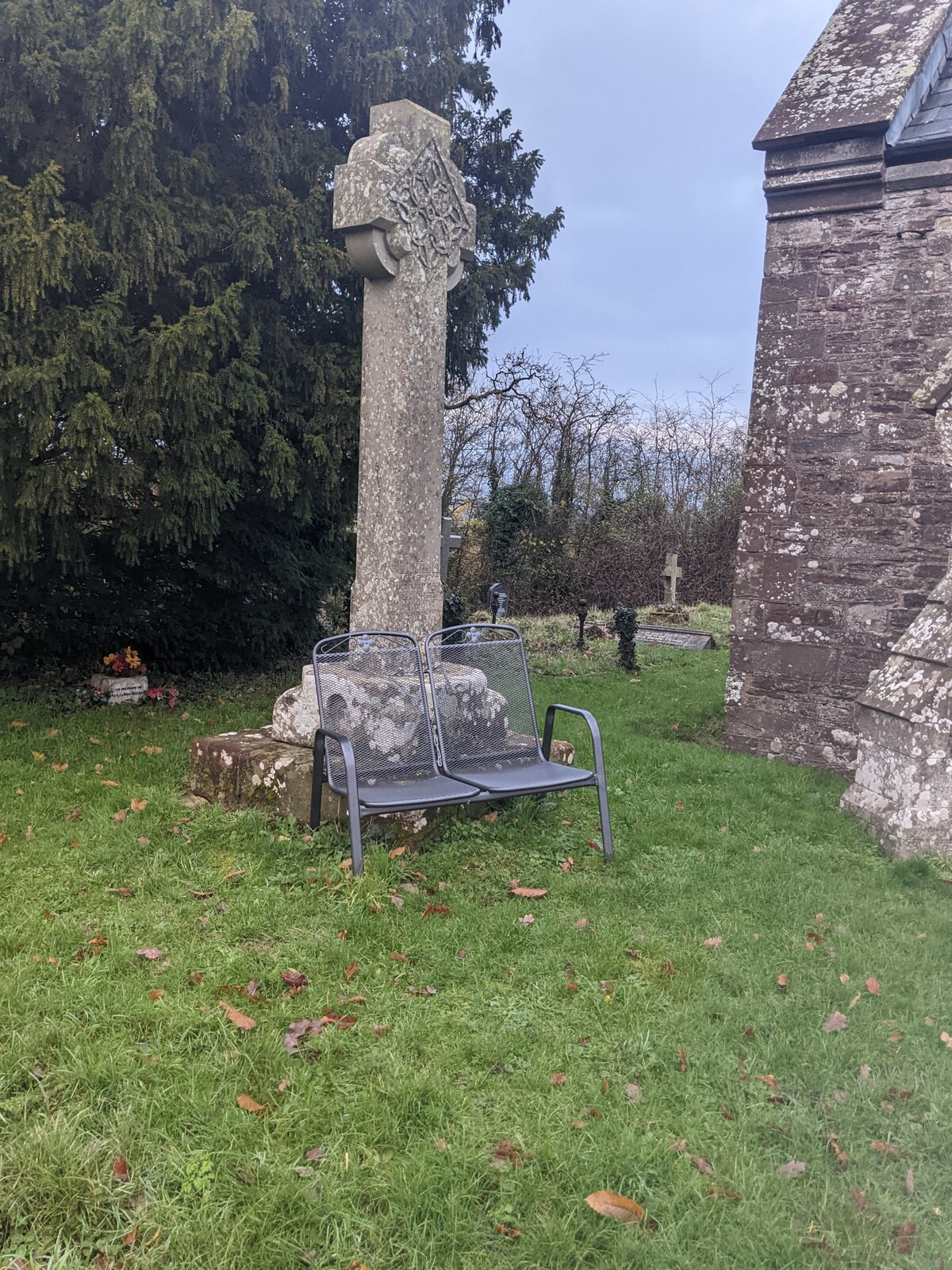
Churchyard cross

== Sources ==
- Brooks, Alan; Pevsner, Nikolaus (2012). Herefordshire. The Buildings of England. New Haven, US and London: Yale University Press. ISBN 978-0-300-12575-7.
- Pevsner, Nikolaus (2003) [1963]. Herefordshire. The Buildings of England. New Haven, US and London: Yale University Press. ISBN 0300096097.
