= Pachan =

Pachan may refer to:

- a 5th-century Italian rhetorician who taught Cadoc
- Pachal, a Coahuiltecan tribe sometimes spelled Pachan
