= Uamh Mhòr =

Summit in Stirling council area, Scotland

Coordinates: 56.276285°N 4.118760°W

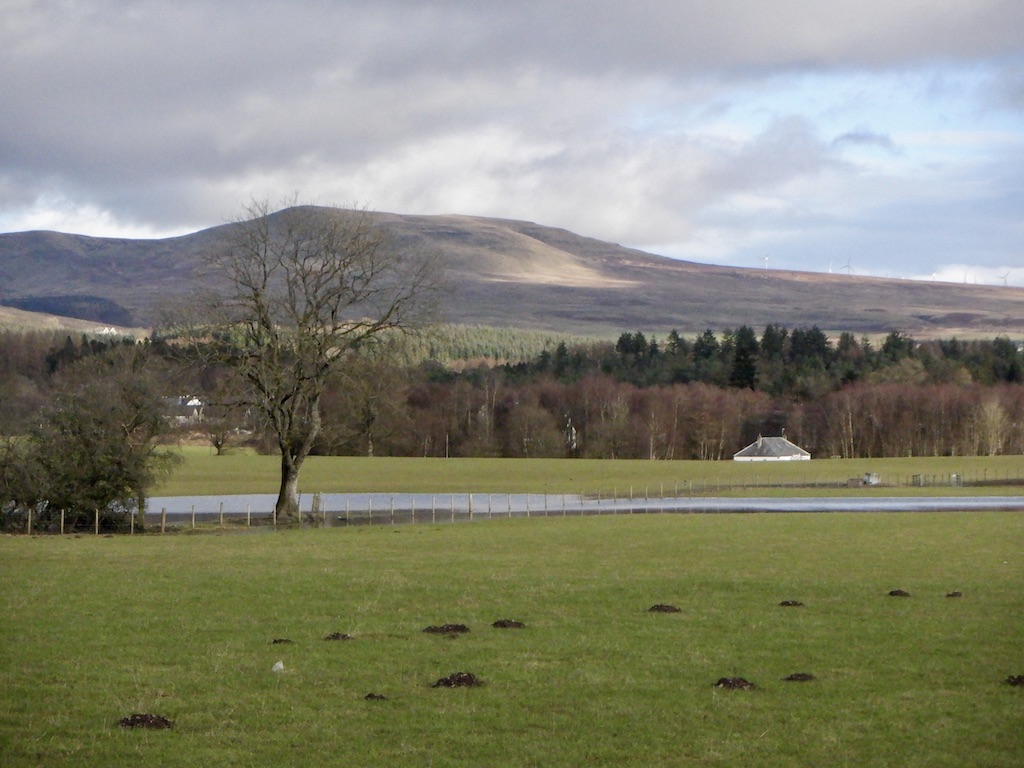
Uamh Mhòr and Uamh Bheag behind it, seen from Callander

Uamh Mhòr (older spelling Uaighmor, also anglicised Uam Var) is a summit located in the Kilmadock parish in Stirling council area, Scotland, situated north of the River Teith between Callander and Doune. The name means "great cave", referring to a large cave in the cliff face which was a hideout for brigands into the eighteenth century. The peak is actually a southern top of Uamh Bheag to the north; despite the name suggesting a smaller hill, Uamh Bheag is actually higher at 664 metres (2,178 ft) compared to just over 600 metres (2,000 ft).

== Allusions ==
The stag in Canto I of Walter Scott's 1810 poem "The Lady of the Lake" flees to "the wild heaths of Uam-Var". The hero of Robert Louis Stevenson's 1886 novel Kidnapped camps by Uam Var near the end of his adventures. Michael Andrews painted "A View from Uamh Mhor" in 1990–91.
