= Gouesnac'h =

Gouesnac'h Gouenac'h
- Commune
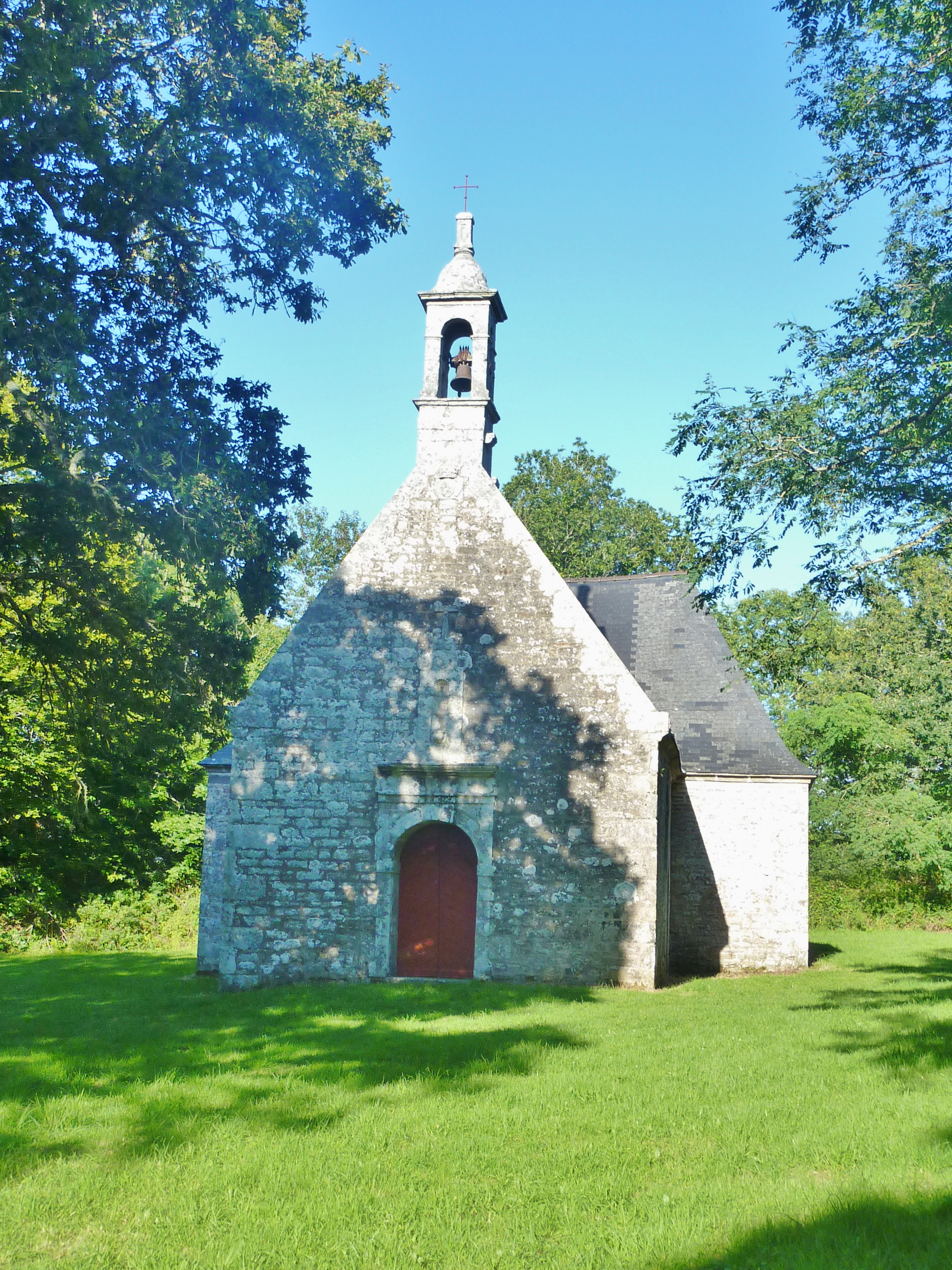
- The Chapel of Our Lady of True Help, in Gouesnac'h

- Coat of arms
- Location of Gouesnac'h
- Location within France Location within Brittany
- Coordinates: 47°54′42″N 4°06′58″W
- Country: France
- Region: Brittany
- Department: Finistère
- Arrondissement: Quimper
- Canton: Fouesnant
- Intercommunality: Pays Fouesnantais

Government
  - Mayor (2020–2026): Jean-Pierre Marc
- Area^{1}: 17.07 km^{2} (6.59 sq mi)
- Highest elevation: 58 m (190 ft)
- Lowest elevation: 0 m (0 ft)
- Population (2023): 2,836
  - Density: 166.1/km^{2} (430.3/sq mi)
- Time zone: UTC+01:00 (CET)
  - Summer (DST): UTC+02:00 (CEST)
- INSEE/Postal code: 29060 /29950
- ^{1} French Land Register data, which excludes lakes, ponds, glaciers > 1 km^{2} (0.386 sq mi or 247 acres) and river estuaries.

Gouesnac'h (Breton: Gouenac'h) is a commune in the Finistère department and administrative region of Brittany in north-western France.

== Geography ==
The small village of Gouesnac'h is located between the Quimper (mediaeval town)/Bénodet (seaside resort) road and the wonderful Odet River.

== Map ==
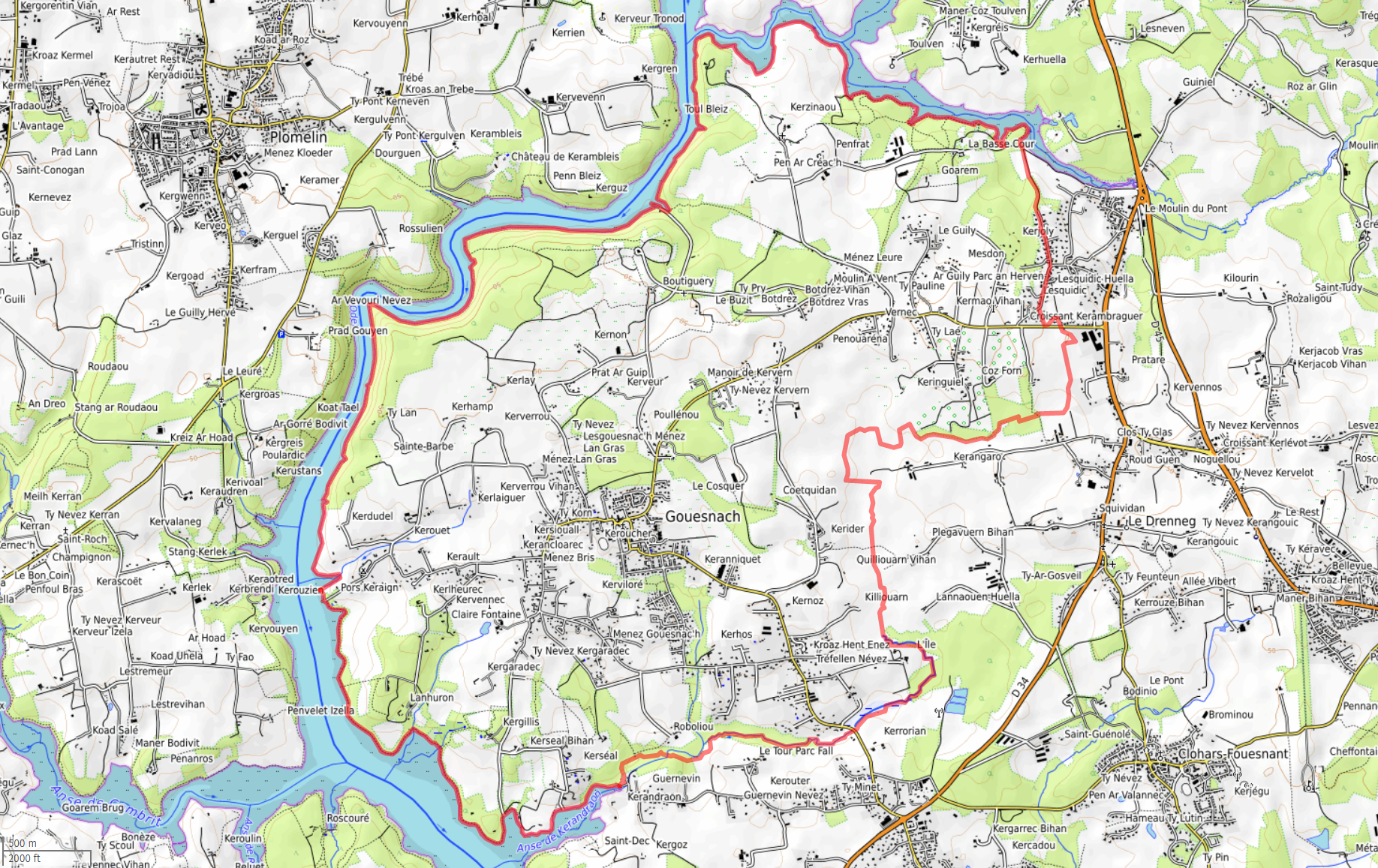
Topographic map.

== History ==
Celtic presence before the Roman invasion. Roman defensive place. Medieval activities and several Catholic foundations.

== Sights ==
With breath-taking views of the entire area, the Boutiguéry Park is dedicated to rhododendrons (30,000 plants) and azaleas.

- Church Saint-Pierre-et-Saint-Paul (1630)
- Chapel Notre-Dame du Vray Secours (1729)
- Chapel Sainte-Barbe (ruins)
- Chapel Saint-Cadou (1578)
- Chapel Saint-Maudet
- 5th-7th centuries oratorio (ruins)
- Saint-Herbot's oratorio (16th century)

== Population ==
Inhabitants of Gouesnac'h are known in French as Gouesnachais.

Historical population
Year	Pop.	±% p.a.
1968	835	—
1975	1,134	+4.47%
1982	1,487	+3.95%
1990	1,769	+2.19%
1999	2,119	+2.03%
2007	2,472	+1.94%
2012	2,623	+1.19%
2017	2,769	+1.09%
2023	2,836	+0.40%
Source: INSEE

== See also ==
- Communes of the Finistère department
