= Kilmadock =

Coordinates: 56.197676°N 4.0859557°W

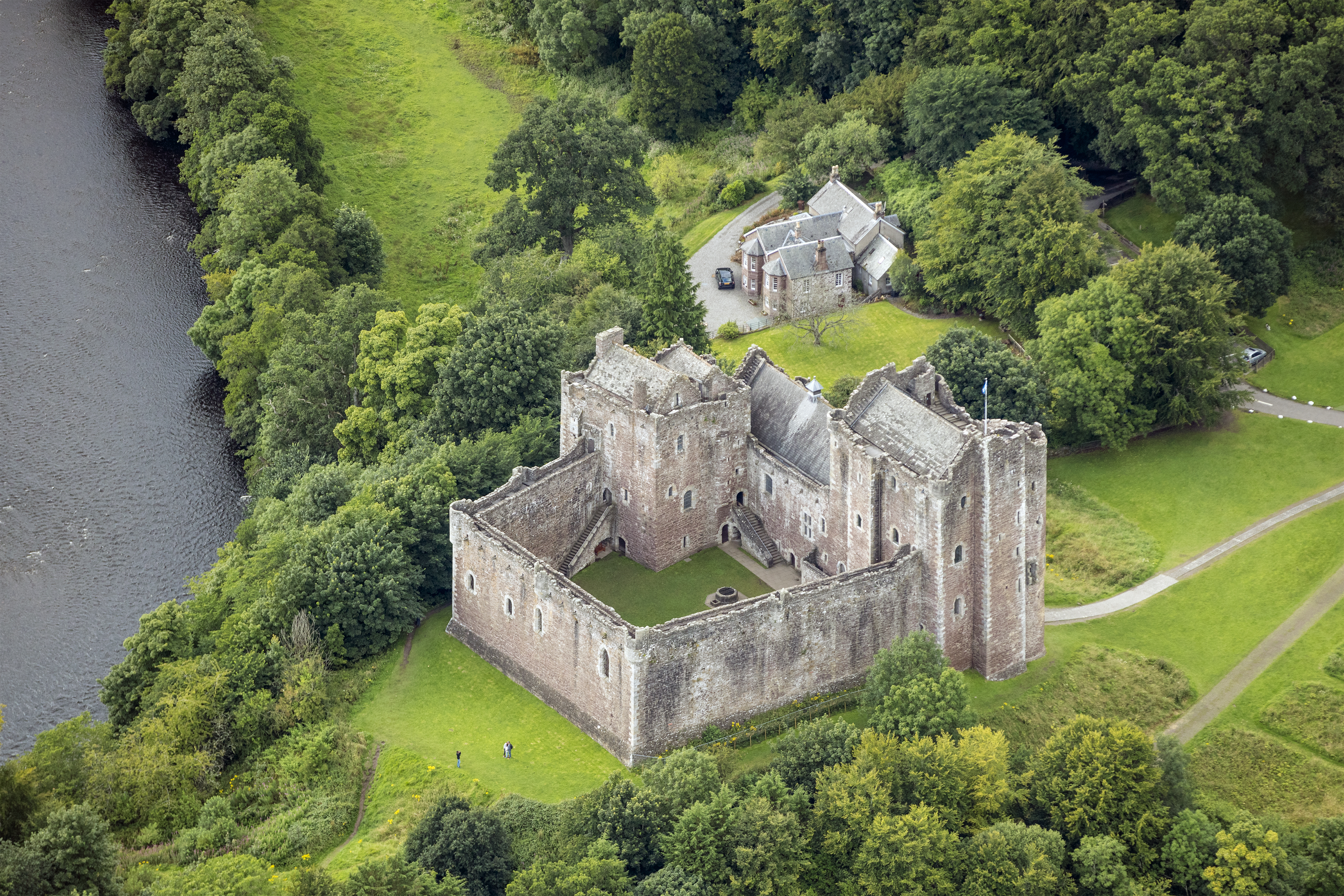
- Doune Castle a key historic site of Kilmadock

- Location within the Stirling council area
- Population: 2,375 (Census 2011)
- OS grid reference: NN706025
- Community council: Kilmadock
- Council area: Stirling
- Lieutenancy area: Stirling and Falkirk (Perthshire prior to 1975)
- Country: Scotland
- Sovereign state: United Kingdom
- Post town: Doune
- Postcode district: FK16
- Police: Scotland
- Fire: Scottish
- Ambulance: Scottish
- UK Parliament: Stirling
- Scottish Parliament: Stirling; Mid Scotland and Fife

Kilmadock parish (Scottish Gaelic Cille Mo Dog), named for Saint Cadoc, containing the settlements of Doune, Deanston, Buchany, Argaty, Hill of Row, Drumvaich, and Delvorich, is situated in Stirling council area, Scotland, and is on the southern border of the former county of Perthshire. Its length is 10 miles (16 kilometres), its breadth from 2–8 mi (3–13 km), and with an area of 24,521 acres (9,923 hectares).

The River Forth runs along its southern boundary, and the River Teith runs east-south-eastward through the centre. A flat tract of considerable breadth lies along the Forth Valley, flanked on each side by a hill-ridge. The valley is traversed by the Teith, and an upland tract, part of the Braes of Doune, ascends to the summit of Uamh Mhòr on the northern boundary.

== Gallery ==
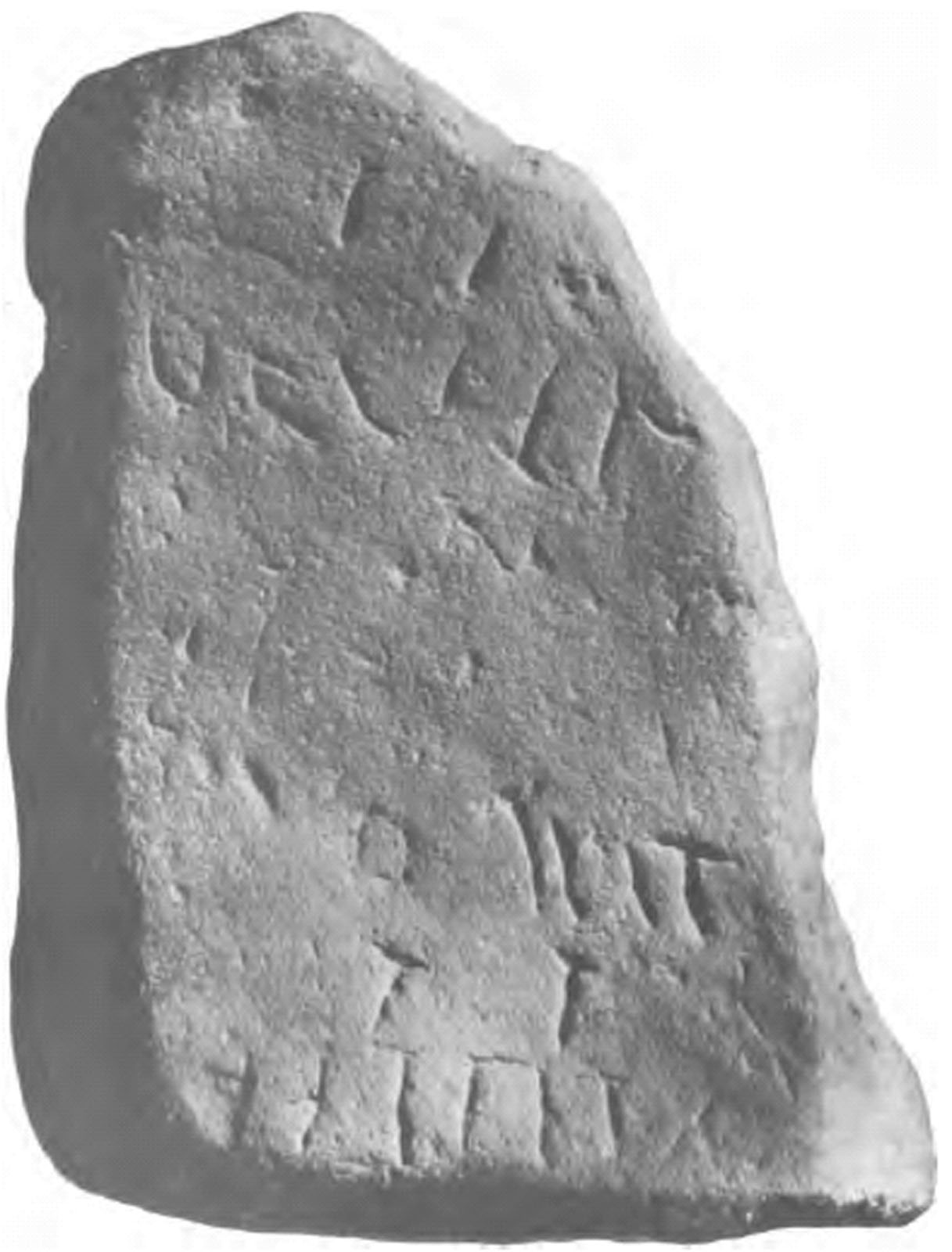
Inscription stone found at Old Kilmadock cemetery

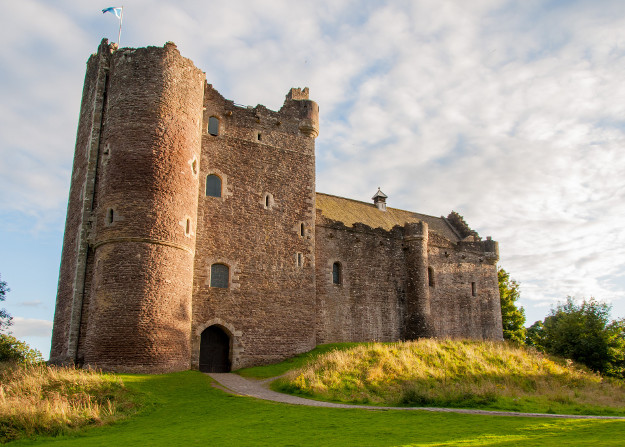
Doune Castle

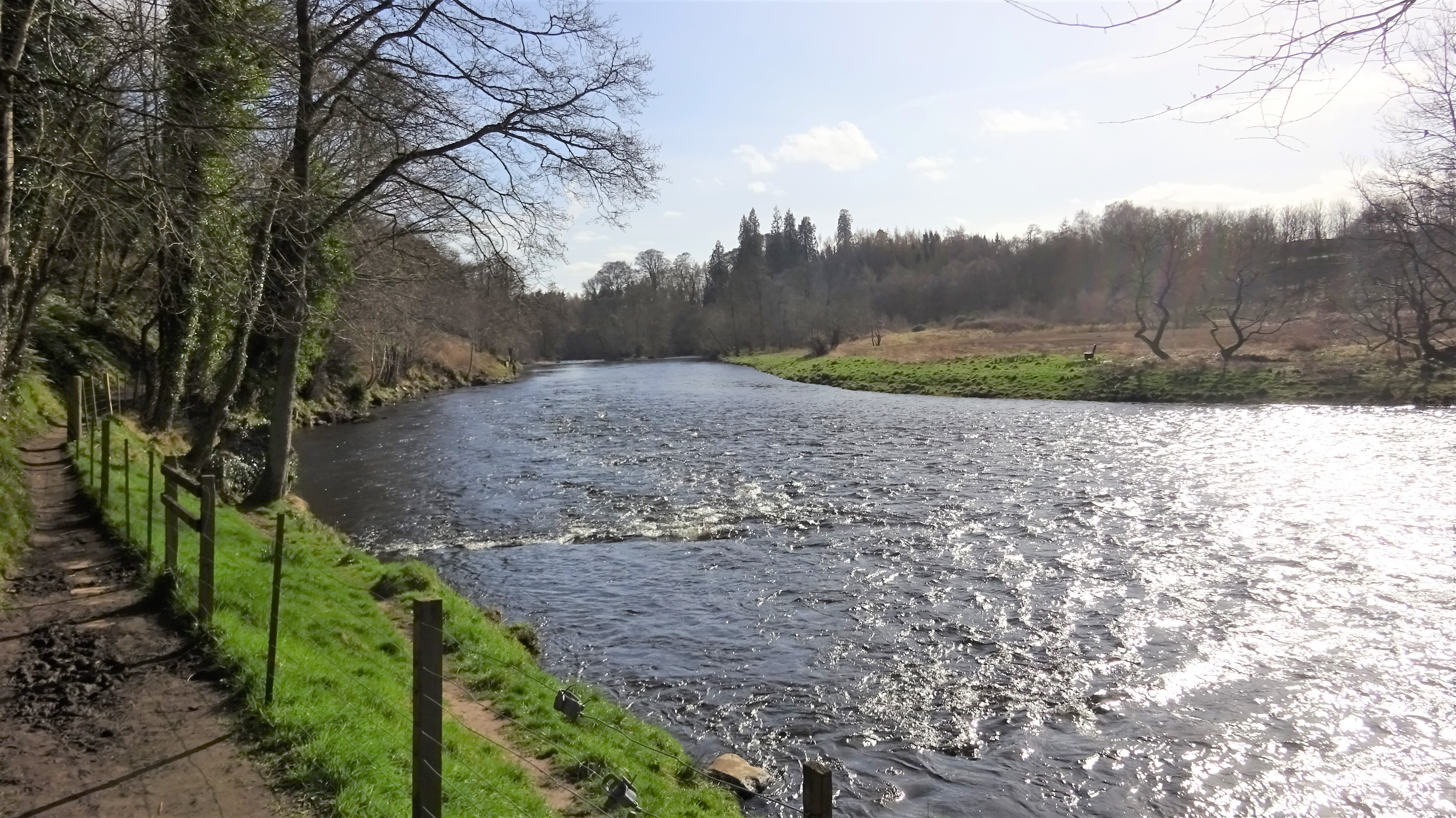
River Teith near Doune

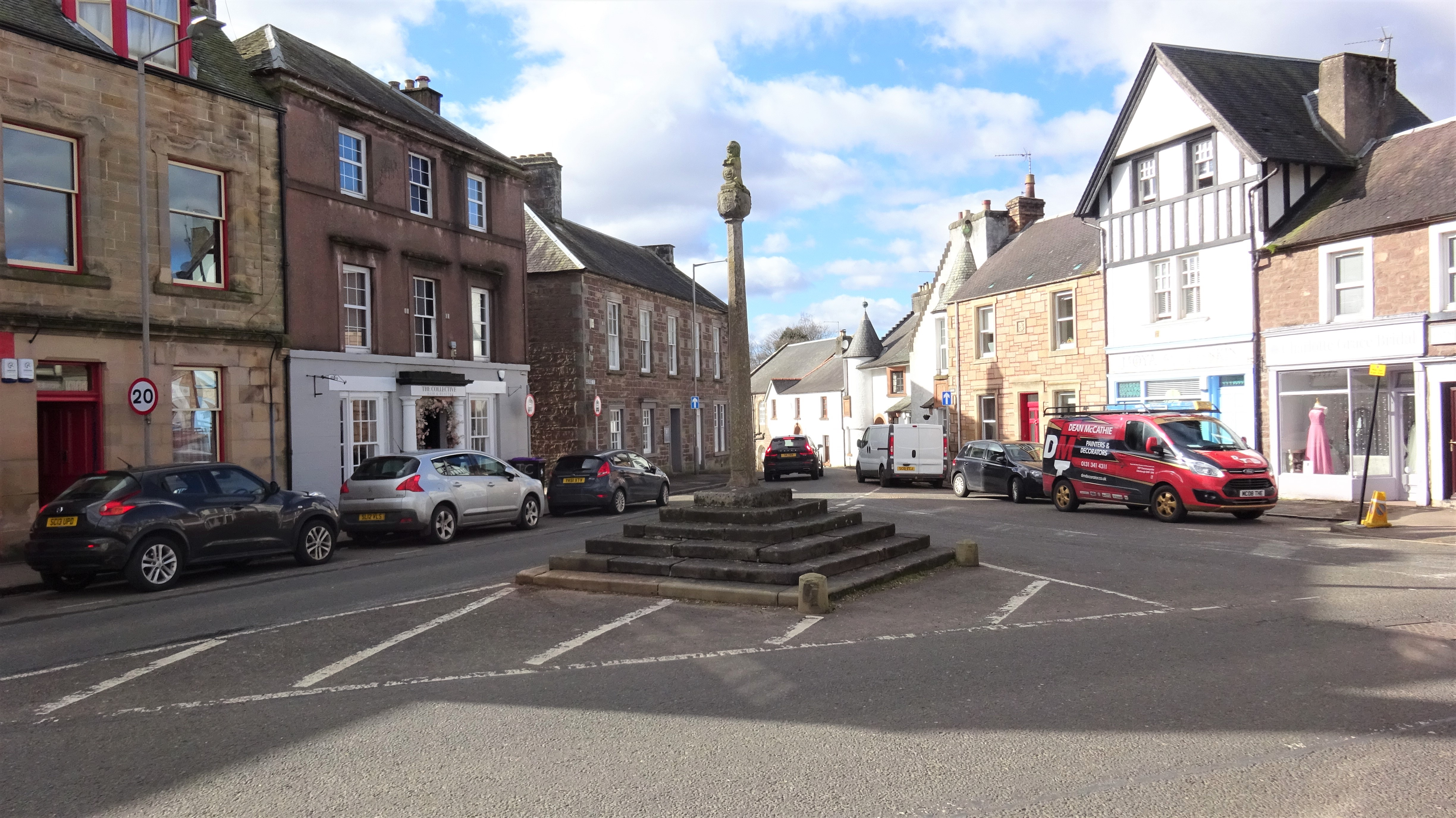
17th century Mercat Cross in Doune

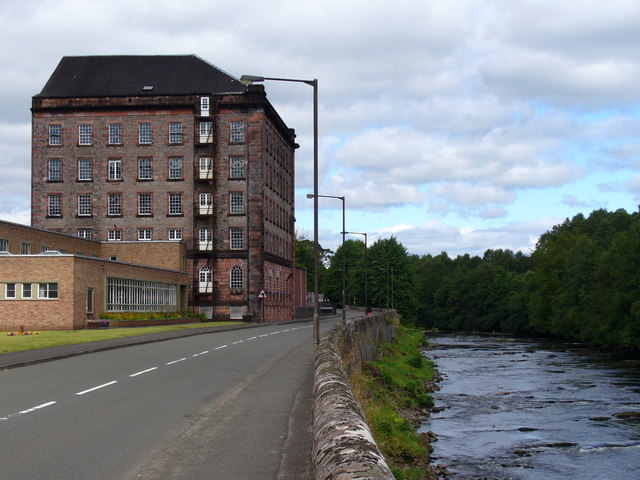
Former mill buildings by the River Teith, now Deanston Distillery

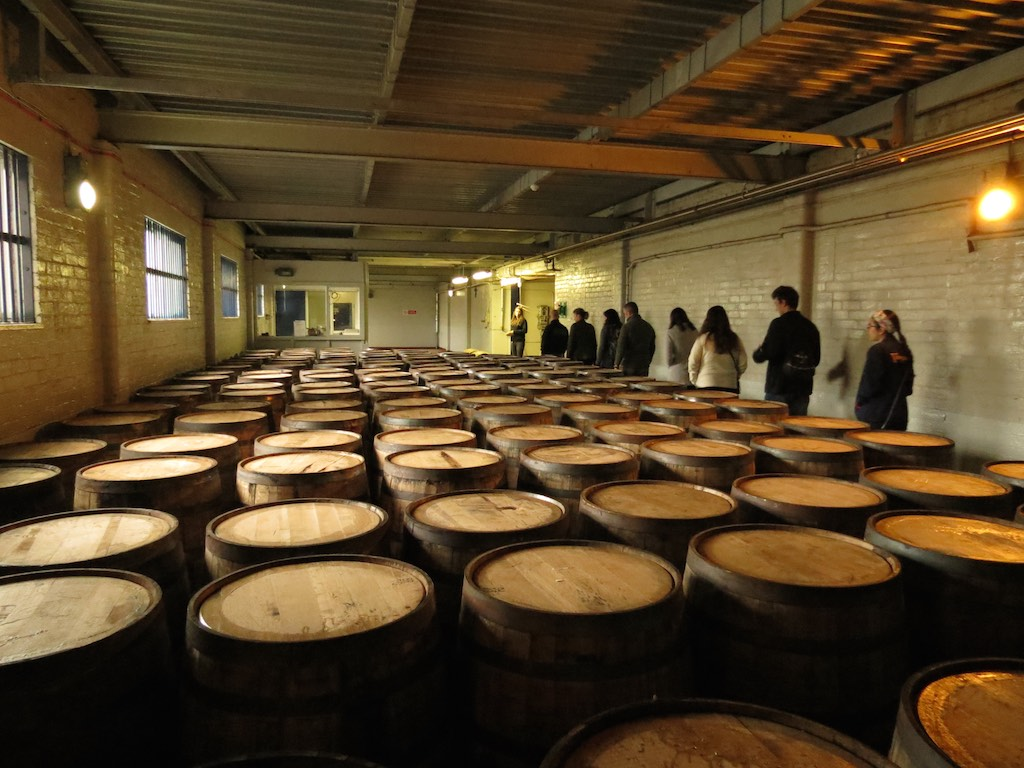
Deanston Distillery

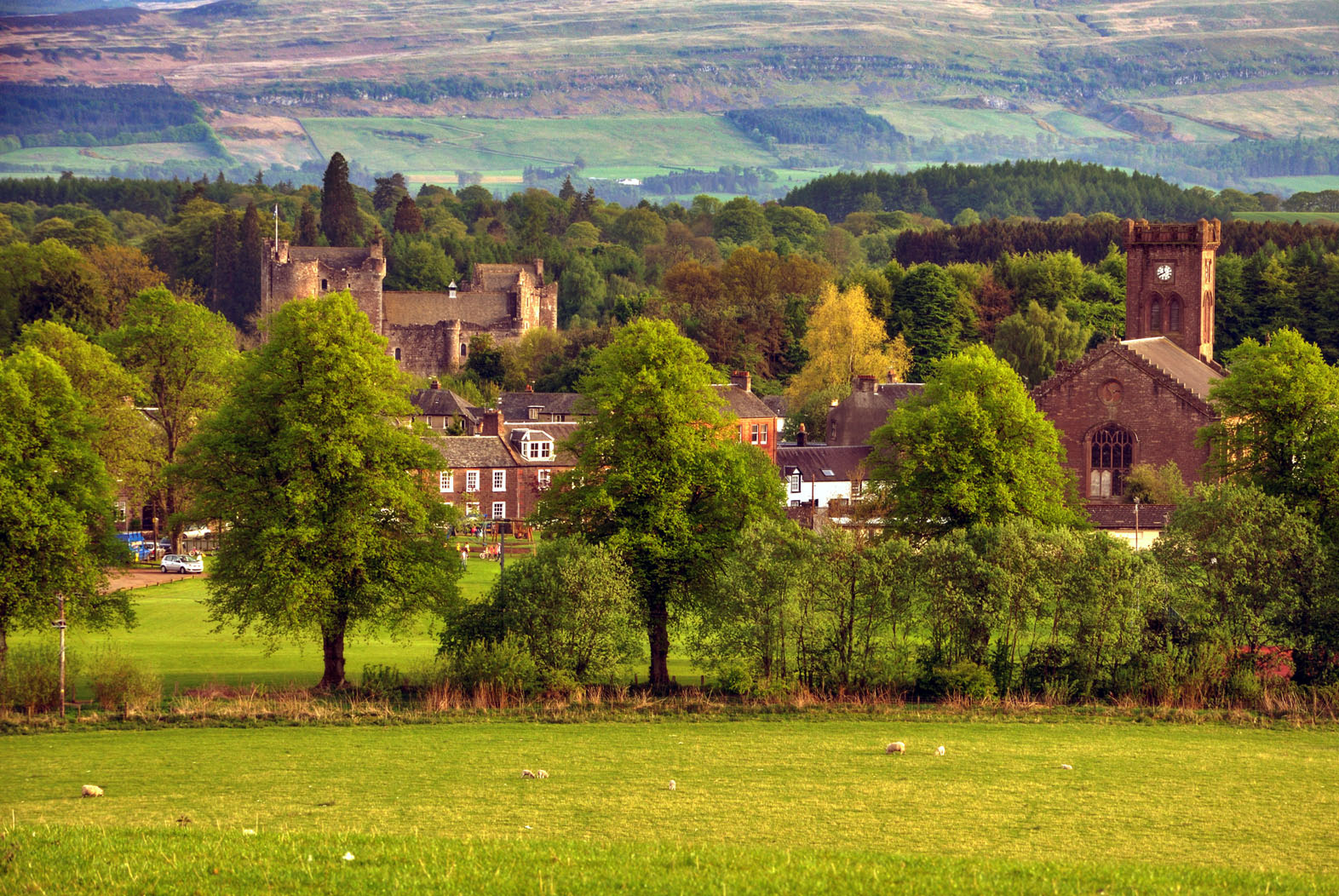
View of Doune from the Commonty Walk

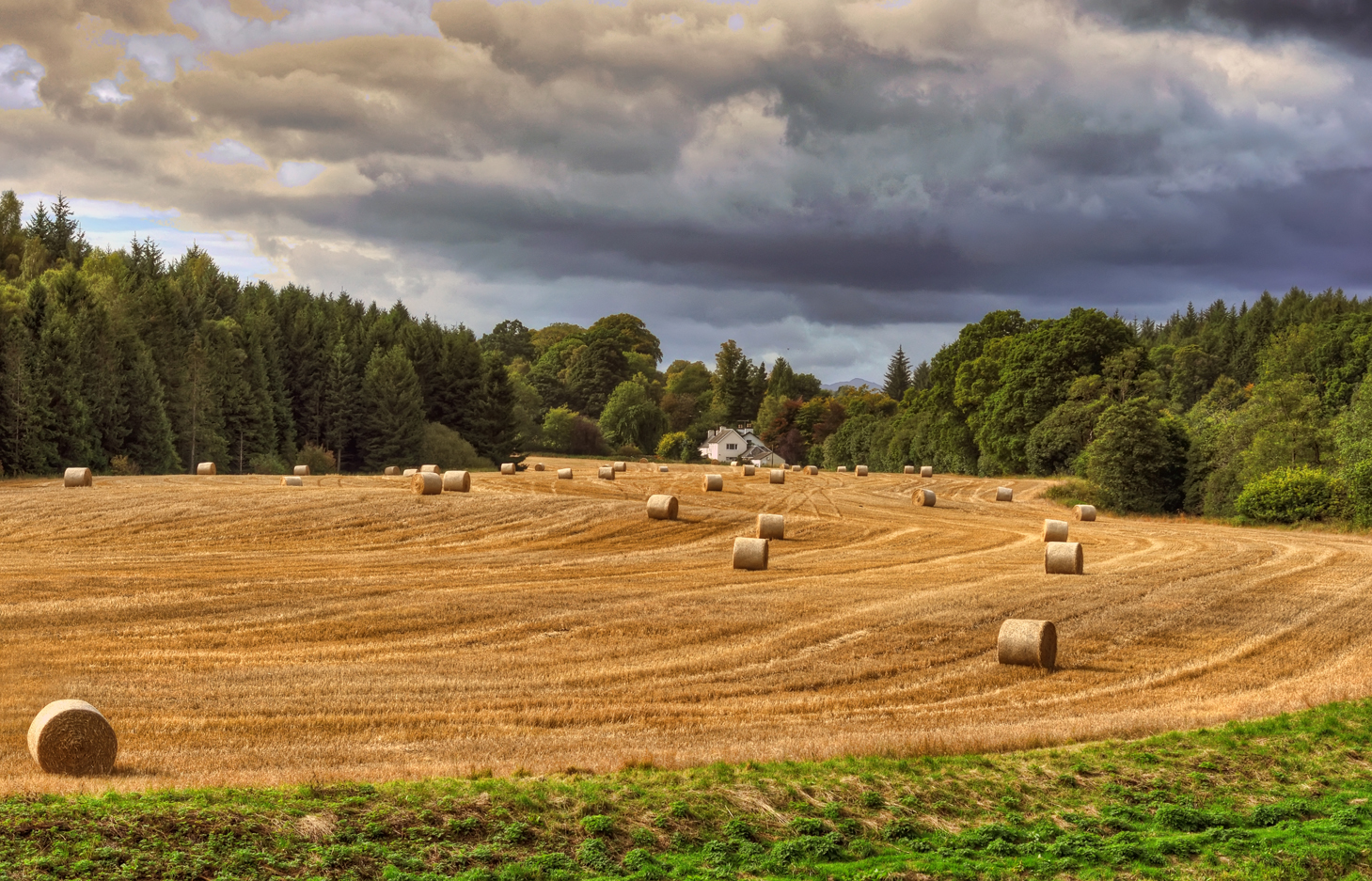
Farmland in Kilmadock areas

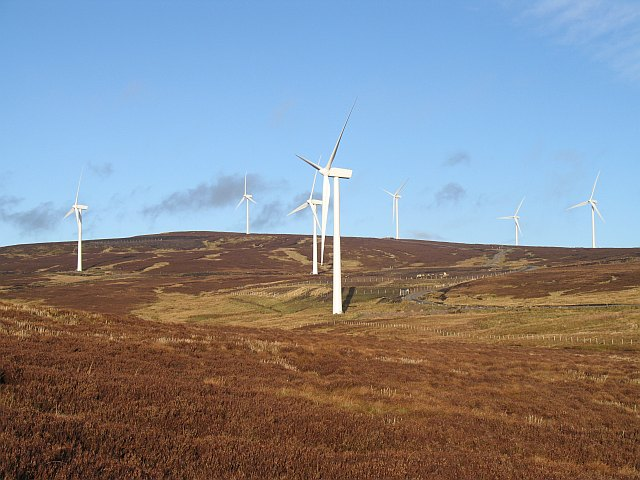
Braes of Doune wind farm

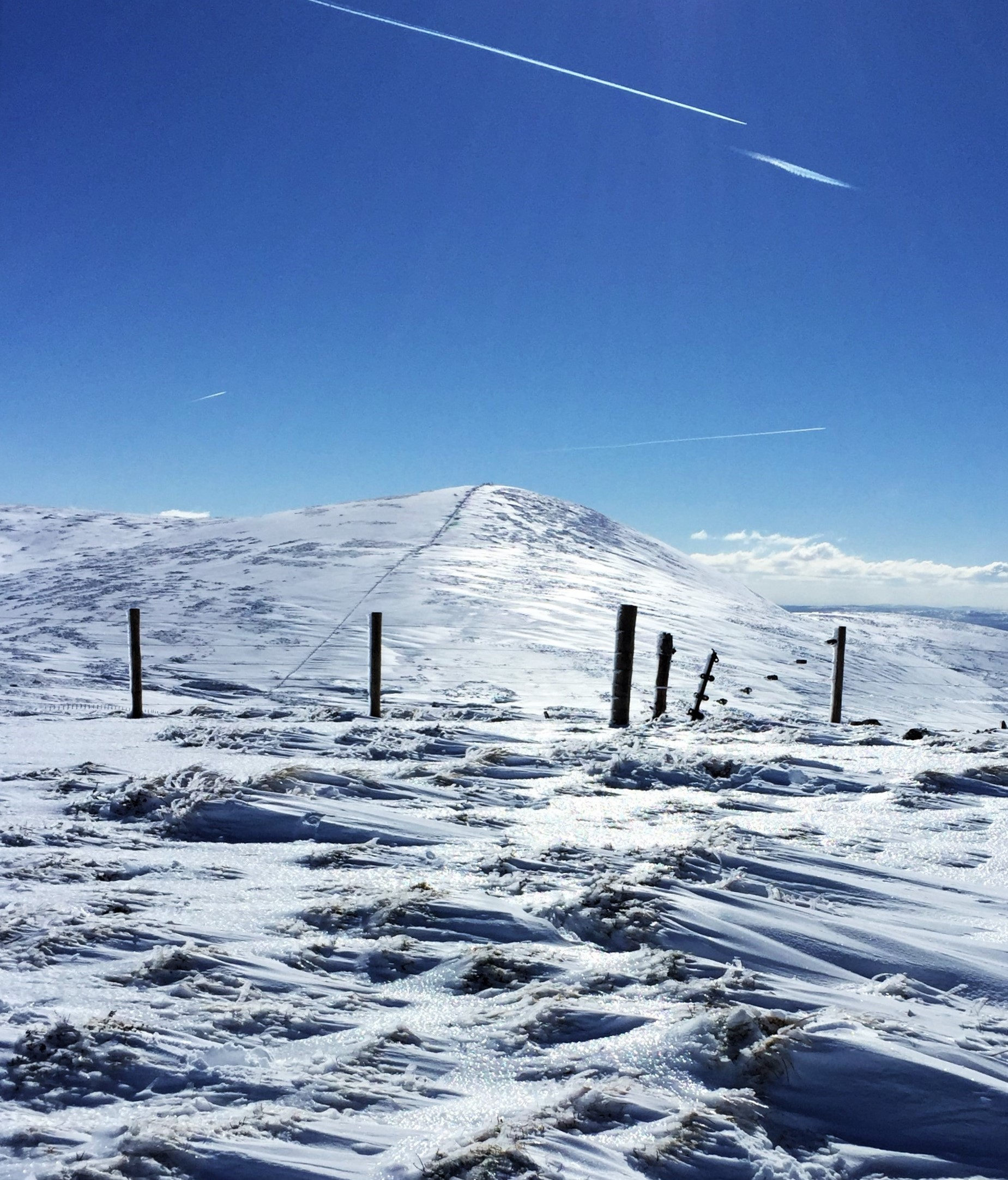
Uamh Bheag, the highest point in Kilmadock

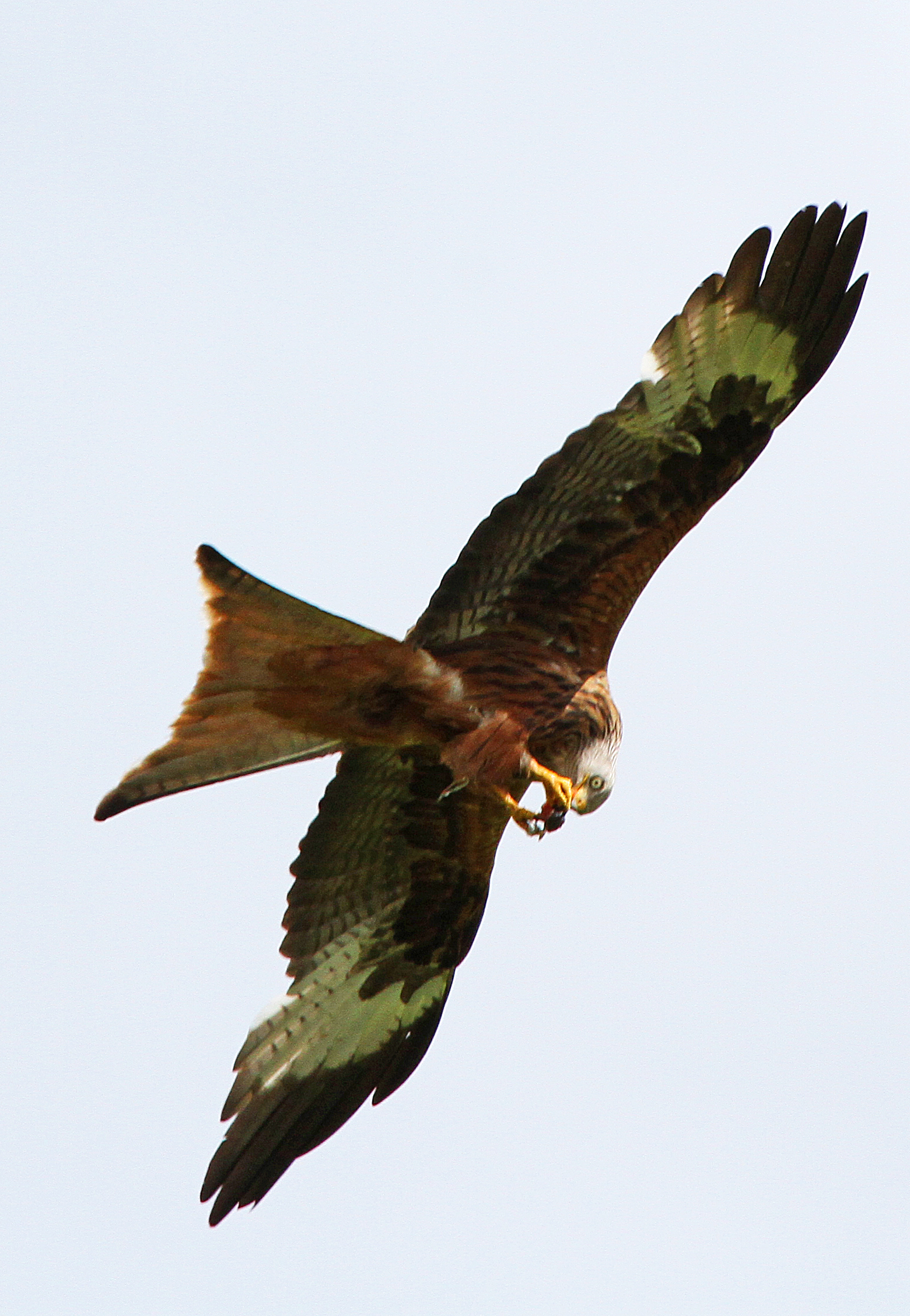
Red Kite photographed at Argaty in Kilmadock
