= Maches =

English Roman Catholic saint

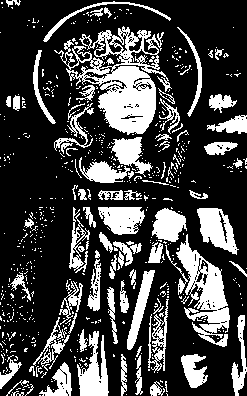
Drawing of St Maches from an old window

St. Maches was a 6th-century princess and Pre-congregational saint of Cornwall and Devon. Maches was the sister of St. Cadog.

Born a daughter of Saint Gwynllyw and his wife Gwladys, Maches lived as a hermit, and was murdered by thieves, at Merthyr Maches (Llanfaches in the Kingdom of Gwent). She was buried in the monastery at Caerwent, now the parish church of St. Stephen at Caerwent, by Saint Tathan to whom the bandits had confessed the crime.
