= Saint Bugi =

6th-century Welsh saint

Bugi ab Gwynlliw Filwr (also Hywgi, Bywgi and Beugi) was a Welsh Christian saint in the 6th century.

He was reportedly the son of Gwynllyw, a Welsh king, brother of saint Cadoc and the father of Beuno (died 640), abbot and saint. His wife (known as Peren, Beren, or Perferen) was the daughter of Lleuddun Luyddog, identified as King Lot of Lothian.

== Legend ==
He married Beren, daughter of Lleuddun Luyddog. The couple was devout and lived quietly on the land given by his grandfather, but had no issue. The legend tell of an angelic visitation with the offer of a child. Nine months later the couple had a son, Beuno, who himself was canonized as a saint. Uncle, spiritual teacher, and guardian of Saint Winifred. Late in life he received a series of visions. Legend says that when Winifred was beheaded by a jilted suitor, Beuno placed the severed head back on the body and Winifred lived. People still sit sick children on the great stone slab of his tomb in hopes of their healing.

== Legacy ==
It is reported that when Bugi was dying he sent for his son Beuno, who came to him, and "After receiving the communion, making his confession and rendering his end perfect he departed this life." It was said that Beuno planted an acorn at the site of Bugi's death, which grew into an oak tree forming an arch; any Englishman passing through this arch would die, while a Welshman would be unharmed.
