= Gwynllyw =

Welsh king and saint

Saint Gwynllyw Milwr
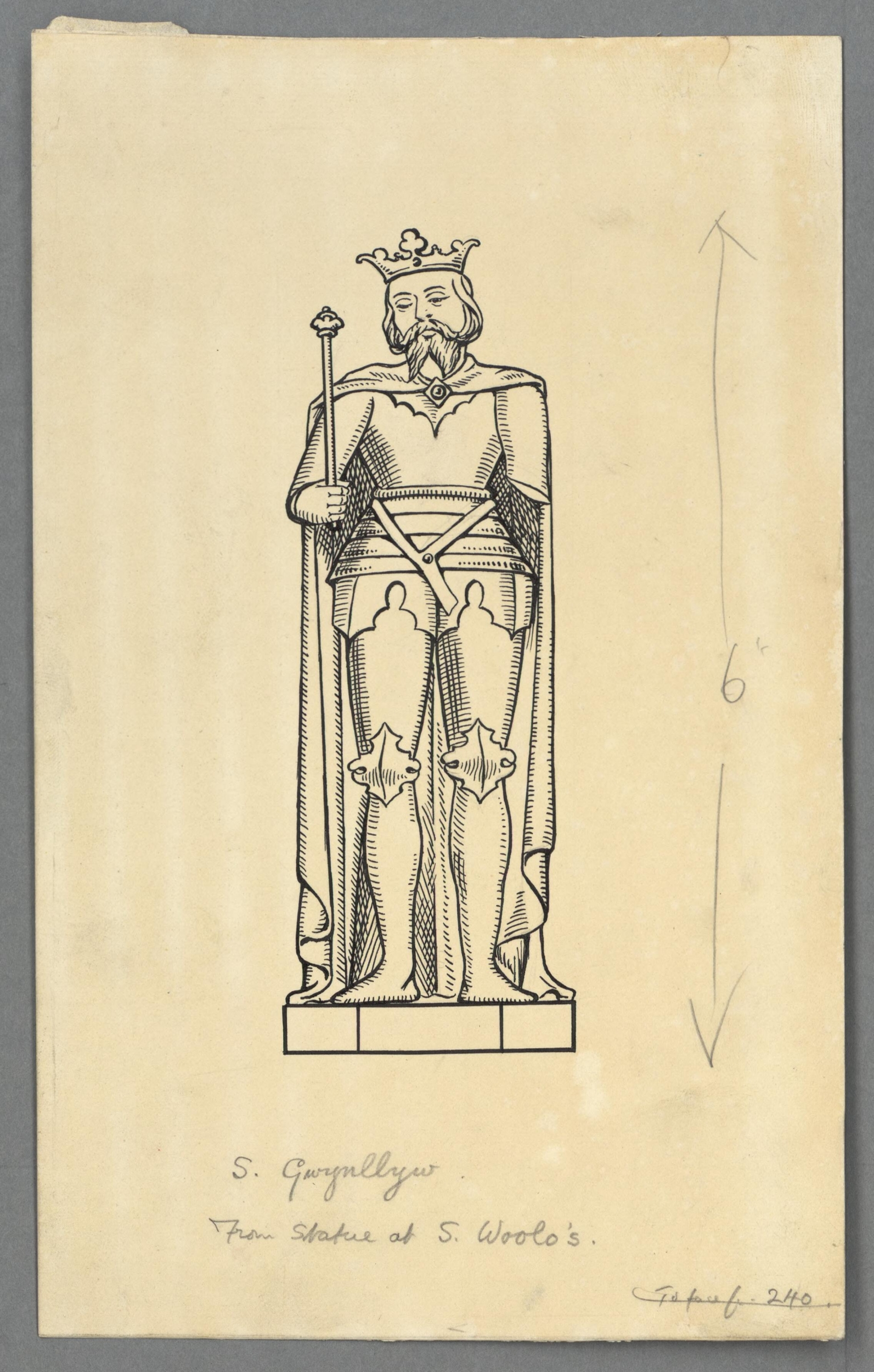
- Drawing of a statue of Gwynllyw (Welsh Portrait Collection)

King
- Born: 17 January 450 traditionally Gwynllwg
- Died: 29 March 529; Stow Hill, Newport
- Venerated in: Eastern Orthodox Church; Roman Catholic Church; Anglican Communion
- Major shrine: St Woolos Cathedral
- Feast: 29 March
- Attributes: crowned warrior, carrying spear sometimes accompanied by an ox
- Patronage: Newport; pirates; soldiers
- Controversy: place of death (see text)

Gwynllyw Filwr or Gwynllyw Farfog (Welsh pronunciation: [ˈɡwɪnɬɪu]), known in English in a corrupted form as Woolos the Warrior or Woolos the Bearded (Latin: Gundleus, Gundleius or Gwenleue; c. 450 – 500 A.D.) was a Welsh king and religious figure.

He was King of Gwynllŵg in South Wales and is the legendary founder and patron saint of the City of Newport, living in the 5th century. According to medieval tradition, he was a feared warlord and livestock raider who was acquainted with the mythical King Arthur, but later encountered religion and became a hermit, founding St Woolos Cathedral in Newport. He was the father of one of the most revered of Welsh saints, Saint Cadoc the Wise.

== Traditional history ==
The medieval lives of Saint Cadoc (c. 1100) by Lifris and of Saint Gwynllyw (c. 1120) preserve fabled details of Gwynllyw, though specifics frequently differ. He is also noted in Welsh king lists. The aforementioned descriptions of Gwynllyw note that his deeds were celebrated by Welsh bards, indicating he had a widespread popular following. Although saints' lives frequently exaggerate, it does seem likely that a monarch of this name existed. A core element in such narratives may contain some elements that are historically accurate.

Gwynllyw was the son of King Glywys, whose powerful kingdom of Glywysing was centred on Glamorgan. It is debatable where the north-west border was, but the prevailing conclusion among historical accounts and historians is the course of the River Loughor from Black Mountain (near Talgarth), i.e. the current border between Carmarthenshire and Swansea. Gwynllyw was a descendant of Macsen Wledig according to some accounts, while his mother Guaul was equally distinguished, being the granddaughter of Cunedda. The kingdom was split on Glywys' death amongst his sons, of whom Gwynllyw was the eldest and most powerful, and he was overlord over the others. The centre of his domain was the cantref of Gwynllwg; named after him, and to be later known in English as Wentloog hundred. One of Gwynllyw's brothers was Saint Petroc, an important Cornish, and Breton saint, and patron saint of Devon.

Narratives of Gwynllyw portray him as an active and merciless warrior who attacked and raided nearby kingdoms. The Life of Saint Cadoc describes him as "very partial to thieves, and used to instigate them somewhat often to robberies" but the Life of Saint Gwynllyw insists he was a just and fair ruler. These raids included attacking his northern neighbour Brycheiniog.

=== Marriage ===
In one such raid, described in Life of Saint Cadoc, Gwynllyw led some 300 men to abduct King Brychan of Brycheiniog's beautiful daughter Gwladys (Gladys), as Brychan had refused to let him marry her. She was one of Brychan's famous twenty-four children. A pitched battle ensued, arrested only by the intervention of Cai and Bedwyr, supporting Gwynllyw and his warriors, and assisted allegedly by the fabled King Arthur. This tale of abduction resembles elements in the tale Culhwch and Olwen and other Arthurian stories, suggesting it originated in bardic stories. Among the various hagiographies, this, the Life of Saint Cadoc, is the earliest reference to the legendary Arthur. According to the Life of Saint Gwynllyw this battle seems never to have occurred; the marriage contracted amicably.

Gwladys soon had a son, the celebrated Saint Cadoc. To mark his son's birth Gwynllyw went on another raid, stealing cattle from Caerwent. When Saint Tathyw approached courageously, to demand the return of a cow, the king was so impressed he decided in response to send his son to Tathyw to be educated at Caerwent. Gwynllyw reputedly had other children, also saints: Cynidr, Bugi and Egwine. Bugi was married to Peren, daughter of King Lleuddun Llyddog of Lothian. One, Maches (Latin: Machuta), the sister of Cadoc according to tradition, was killed by robbers stealing her finest ram. Tathan, to whom the murderers confessed their crime, built a church on the spot.

=== Hermit ===
Once grown, Cadoc was deeply religious. According to some sources, it was his example and preaching that persuaded Gwynllyw to abandon his life of violence and to seek forgiveness for his sins. King Gwynllyw is said to have had a dream in which an angel spoke to him, and he saw a vision of a white ox with a black spot high on its forehead. The story goes that Gwynllyw set out, and when he saw the ox of his dream he founded a hermitage there, on what is now Stow Hill in Newport, South Wales, which he built out of wood. Of this spot Gwynllyw said "There is no retreat in the world such as in this space which I am destined now to inhabit. Happy therefore is the place, happier then is he who inhabits it." Gwynllyw's decision to abandon his kingship and retire to a religious life seems to have been a common theme amongst Welsh saints. Even his violent past was not unusual, being shared by Saint Illtyd amongst others.

Gwladys accompanied Gwynllyw into a hermit's life, and for a while they lived an ascetic life together on Stow Hill, fasting, eating a vegetarian diet, and bathing in the cold waters of the Usk, winter and summer alike. Apparently, this was preceded and followed at night-time by a mile-long walk in the nude. A miraculous fountain started on the hill when Gwynllyw prayed for water. This heroic asceticism was tempered when Cadoc persuaded his parents to separate. Gwladys founded her own hermitage at Pencarn.

=== Death ===
When Gwynllyw was dying he was attended both by his son Cadoc and by Saint Dyfrig, who administered the last sacrament to him.

The traditional date of his death, 29 March, is the day dedicated to him. The year of his death is uncertain; suggestions include 500 and 523.

=== Cathedral ===
Following Gwynllyw's death his hermit cell became an important shrine, and a church was built there. This is now St Woolos Cathedral, the seat of the Bishop of Monmouth. Gwynllyw's church was rebuilt in stone in the 9th century, a sign of his importance and the wealth of his shrine; at that time stone buildings were unusual in Wales. Incorporated at the west end of the current cathedral, the Galilee Chapel, or St Mary's Chapel, is part of this original building.

== Veneration ==
Gwynllyw's cult grew as a series of miracles were attributed to him. His fountain at Stow Hill healed those who drank from it, and angels were seen near his tomb. A later miracle included the protection of a bard from flood waters.

No weight should be attached to there having been any mystical basis for a Viking fleet's destruction at sea after they had plundered the church, containing offerings for Gwynllyw's intercession. Similarly, a man's having been supernaturally driven mad after stealing from Gwynllyw's church is mere fancy.

Devotion to Gwynllyw clearly became ubiquitous, not only among the Welsh, but among Saxons and Normans who came to live in the Newport area. The Norman Lords of Newport continued to enlarge the church – a process that has continued up to the present day.

== Post-medieval folklore ==
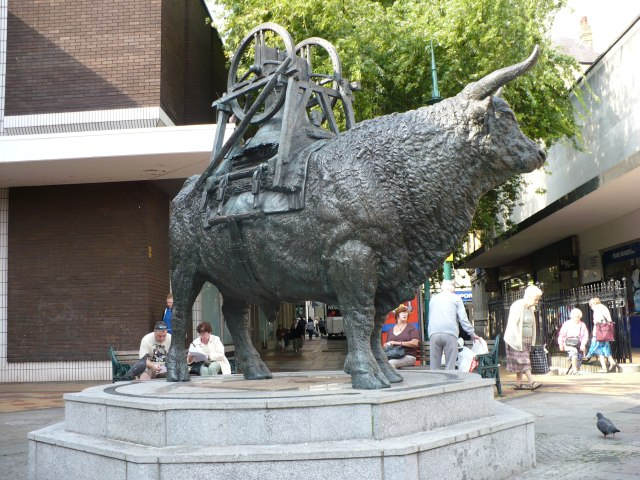
The Vision of Saint Gwynllyw by Sebastien Boyesen

Stories of Gwynllyw's dark past later included tales of piracy and claims that his ships, based in the Uskside parish of Pillgwenlly that bears his name, caused terror across the Bristol Channel. One tradition asserts that this background meant Gwynllyw was the patron saint of choice for Welsh pirates and smugglers including Sir Henry Morgan. Certainly the many sailors based in Newport would have known of him. Another local story claims that Gwynllyw forcibly baptised the population of Gwynllwg by the sword.

== Legacy ==
In 1949 St Woolos Church became a full cathedral and, besides churches, the saint is remembered today through St Woolos Hospital, St Woolos Primary School and in 1988 a Welsh language school, Ysgol Gyfun Gwynllyw, was set up in Pontypool.

The vision of an ox inspired the sculpture by Sebastien Boyesen called The Vision of Saint Gwynllyw or The Bell Carrier, finished in 1996 and found in central Newport today.

== See also ==
- Saint Gwynllyw, patron saint archive
