= Cadou =

Cadou was an early Christian in Brittany in France, not be confused with Cadoc. He was venerated as a saint after his death, with his cult centered on the Ile de Cadou.
