= Cynidr =

Welsh saint and bishop

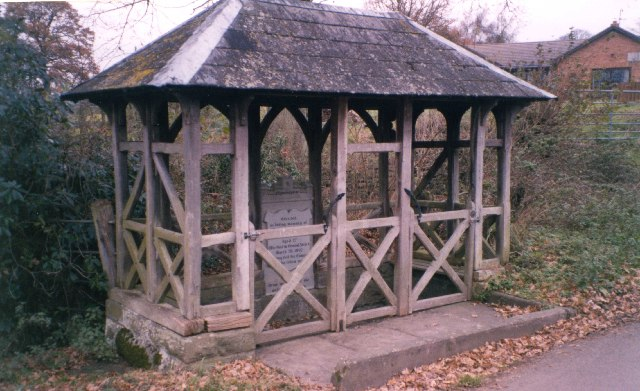
Cynidr's Well, Ffynnon Gynydd

St Cynidr was a 6th-century Catholic pre-congregational saint of South Wales and first bishop of Glasbury, Powys.

== Veneration ==
Cynidr is buried in Glasbury, where he is venerated with a feast day of 27 April.

The parish church of St Cynidr (St Kenider) at Glasbury commemorates his work although the current church was built c.1088AD. A 'holy well' in the town is also attributed to him.

The village of Llangynidr is named after him (Llan being the Welsh word for Church, Gynidr being the Welsh mutated version of Cynidr).

== Family ==
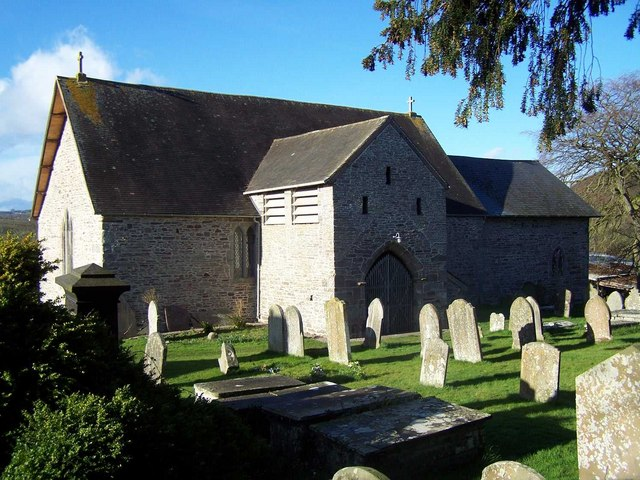
Church of St Eigon

Cynidr was the son of St Gwladys, grandson of King Brychan and the brother of St Eigon, the patron saint of Llanigon, near Glasbury.
