= Cadoc =

Welsh saint

Saint Cadoc
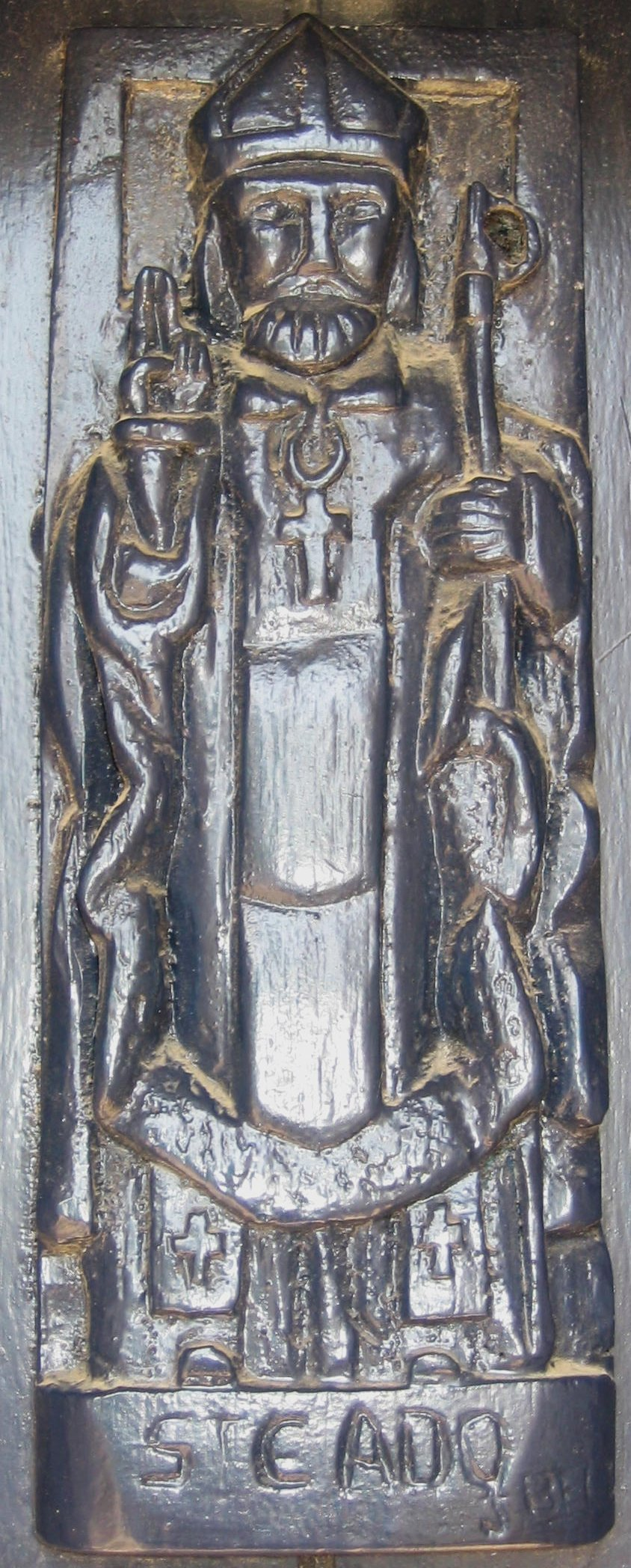
- Saint Cadog as represented at Belz in Brittany

Abbot
- Born: c. 497 traditionally Kingdom of Gwynllwg,, Wales
- Died: 580, traditionally 21 September; Beneventum (see text)
- Venerated in: Catholic Church; Eastern Orthodox Church; Anglicanism
- Major shrine: Llancarfan Abbey (now destroyed)
- Feast: 25 September, formerly 24 January
- Attributes: Bishop throwing a spear, crown at feet, sometimes accompanied by a stag, a pig or a mouse
- Patronage: Glamorgan; Llancarfan; famine victims; deafness; glandular disorders
- Controversy: Place of death (see text)

Saint Cadoc, also spelled Cadog (Medieval Latin: Cadocus; Modern Welsh: Cadog or Catwg; born c. 497 or before), was a 5th–6th-century abbot of Llancarfan, near Cowbridge in Glamorgan, Wales, a monastery famous from the era of the Celtic church as a centre of learning, where Illtud spent the first period of his religious life under Cadoc's tutelage. Cadoc is credited with the establishment of many churches in Cornwall, Brittany, Dyfed and Scotland. He is known as Cattwg Ddoeth, "the Wise", and a large collection of his maxims and moral sayings were included in Volume III of the Myvyrian Archaiology. He is listed in the 2004 edition of the Roman Martyrology under 21 September. His Norman-era "Life" is a hagiography of importance to the case for the historicity of Arthur as one of seven saints' lives that mention Arthur independently of Geoffrey of Monmouth's Historia Regum Britanniae.

== Biography ==
Cadoc's story appears in a Vita Cadoci written shortly before 1086 by Lifris of Llancarfan; "it was clearly written at Llancarfan with the purpose of honouring the house and confirming its endowments". Consequently, it is of limited historical merit though some details are of interest. Llancarfan did not survive the intrusion of Norman power into South Wales, being dissolved about 1086.

Cadoc began life under a cloud of violence. His father, Gwynllyw the Bearded, was one of the lesser kings of Wales, a brother of Saint Petroc, and a robber chieftain. He wanted to propose to Princess Gwladys, daughter of King Brychan of Brycheiniog, a neighboring chieftain, but Brychan turned away the envoys asking for Gwladys' hand. Wildly in love, Gwynllyw and Gwladys eloped from her father's court at Brecon and escaped over the mountains in a raid in which 200 of Gwynllyw's 300 followers perished.

Born into the royal families of Gwynllwg and Brycheiniog, it is said he worked miracles even before his birth. Strange lights shone in his parents’ house and the cellars were miraculously filled with food.

Cadoc was born in Monmouthshire around the year 497. An angel announced his birth and summoned the hermit Meuthi to baptise and teach him. A holy well sprang up for his baptism and afterwards flowed with wine and milk. It is thought that he was baptised as Cathmail (Cadfael). After the birth of his son, Gwynllyw went on a wild celebratory raid with a new band of fearless warriors. Among other livestock, he stole the cow of an Irish monk, St. Tathyw of Caerwent. This is probably Tathan, a reputed early abbot of nearby Caerwent whose dedications appear around Llantwit Major. Tathyw was not afraid of Gwynllyw and boldly went to confront him, demanding the return of the cow. On a sudden impulse, or perhaps guided by divine inspiration, Gwynllyw decided Cadoc would go to live under the monk's care, and he was sent away to be educated at Tathyw's monastery in Caerwent. Cadoc picked up a basic knowledge of Latin and received a rudimentary education that prepared him for further studies in Ireland and Wales. Most important, Cadoc learned to appreciate the life of a monk and a priest.

One day while in the Cardiff district of Glamorgan, Cadoc was being chased by an armed swineherd from an enemy tribe. As he ran through the woods looking for a place to hide, he came upon a wild boar, white with age. Disturbed by his presence, the boar made three fierce bounds in his direction, but Cadoc's life was spared when the boar miraculously disappeared. Cadoc took this as a heavenly sign, and marked the spot with three tree branches. The valley was owned by his uncle, King Pawl of Penychen, who made a present of the land to his nephew. The location later became the site of the great church college and monastery at Llancarvan.

Maches (Latin: Machuta), the sister of Cadoc according to tradition, was killed by robbers who were stealing her finest ram. Tathan, to whom the murderers confessed their crime, built a church on the spot.

In adulthood Cadoc refused to take charge of his father's army, "preferring to fight for Christ". He founded his first monastery at Llancarfan in the Vale of Glamorgan, and from there he went to Ireland to study for three years. Returning to Wales, he studied with Bachan or Pachan, a teacher of rhetoric from Italy. He then travelled to Scotland where he founded a monastery at Cambuslang. Back at Llancarfan, his influence helped it to grow into one of the chief monasteries in South Wales.

One tradition has it that he went on pilgrimage to Rome, but more certain is the knowledge of time spent in Brittany. He settled there on an island in the Etel river, now called L'Ile de Cado, where he built an oratory, founded a monastery and devoted himself to spreading the Gospel. There are chapels dedicated to him at Belz and Locoal-Mendon in Morbihan and at Gouesnac'h in Finistère, where he is called upon to cure the deaf. His name is also the basis of some thirty Breton place-names.

=== Llancarfan ===
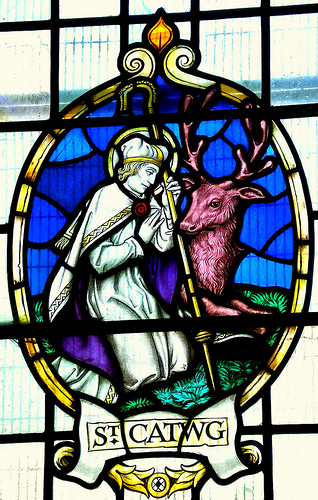
St Catwg window in Caerphilly

According to Huddleston, most Welsh writers assign the founding of Llancarfan to the period of St. Germanus's visit to Britain in A.D. 447, stating further that the first principal was St. Dubric, or Dubricius, on whose elevation to the episcopate St. Cadoc, or Cattwg, succeeded. On the other hand, he notes that the Life of St. Germanus, written by Constantius, a priest of Lyons, about fifty years after the death of the saint, says nothing at all of any school founded by him or under his auspices, in Britain, nor is mention made of his presence in Wales.

An alternate tradition holds that Llancarvan monastery or "Church of the Stags", in Glamorgan, and not far from the Bristol Channel, was founded in the latter part of the fifth century by Cadoc. Here he established a monastery and college, which became the seminary of many great and holy men. The spot at first seemed an impossible one, an almost inaccessible marsh, but he and his monks drained and cultivated it, transforming it into one of the most famous and attractive religious homes in South Wales. The plan of the building included a monastery, a college, and a hospital. Having got the community established, he went off to Ireland to study and teach. When he returned three years later, he found the monastery in ruins. Furious, he forced the monks back to manual labour, dragging timber from the woods to begin the work of reconstruction. Two stags came out of the forest to help them, which is said to be why the stream running past the monastery is called the Nant Carfan, the Stag Brook.

Rev. Rees suggests that although the monastery was said to have been situated at Llancarfan, the particular spot on which it stood was called Llanfeithin.

=== Scotland ===
About 528, after his father's death, Cadoc is said to have built a stone monastery in Scotland probably at Kilmadock, which was named for the saint, north-west of Stirling, where the Annant Burn enters the River Teith about 2 miles upstream from Doune. Near the ruins of the old Kilmadock church and graveyard is Hermit's Croft, thought to be where he lived for seven years. Seven local churches that were built in his name came under the authority of Inchmahome Priory. It is also said that Cadoc's monastery was "below Mount Bannauc" (generally taken to be the hill southwest of Stirling down which the Bannockburn flows). It has been suggested that the monastery was where the town of St Ninians now stands, two kilometers south of Stirling. Scottish followers were known as "Gille Dog", the servants of Cadog, which appears as a surname, first as Dog, and later as Doig, Dock, and Doak.

== Legends ==
=== Cadoc and Arthur ===
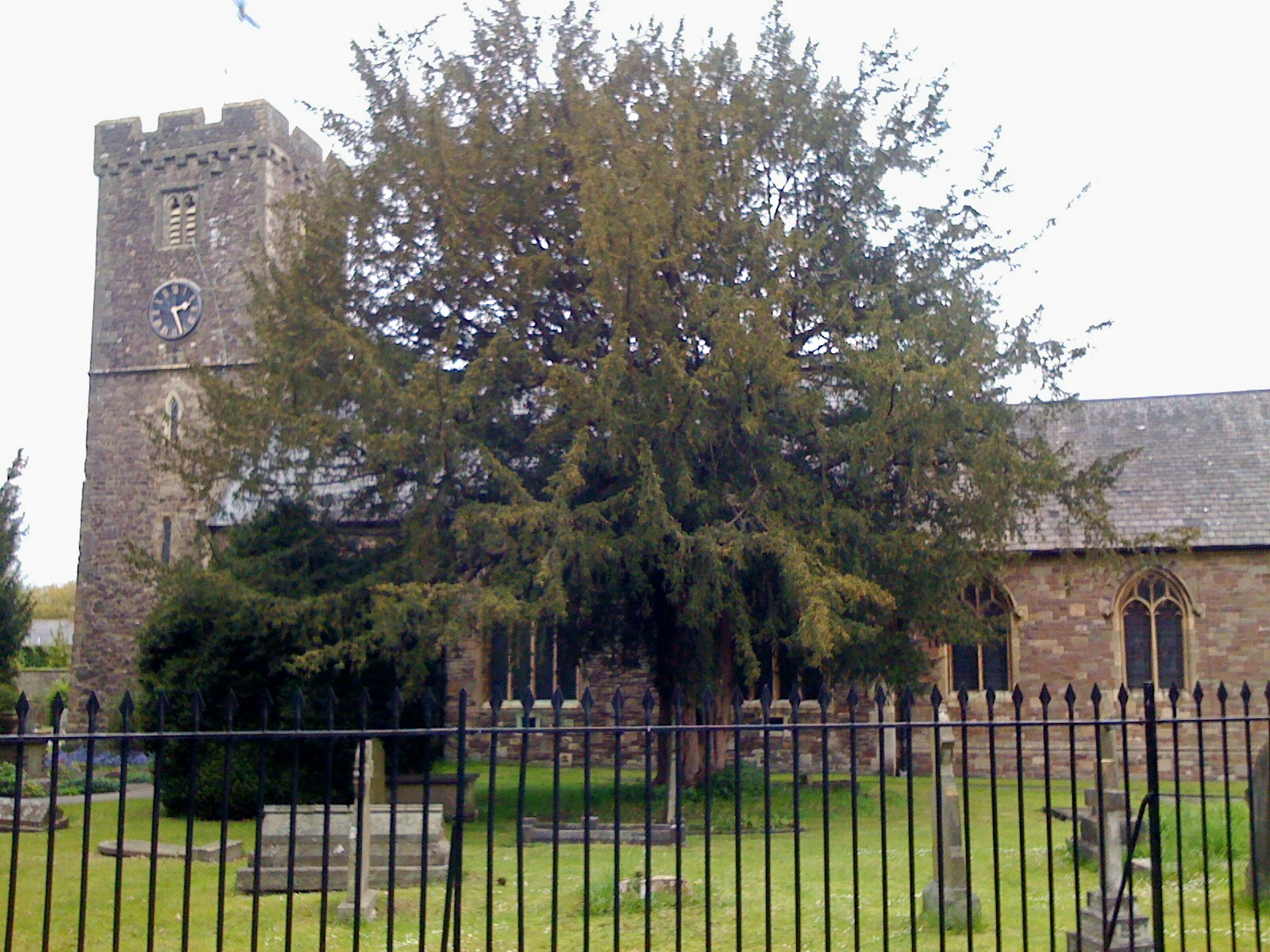
St Cadoc's Church, Caerleon

Cadoc came into conflict with Arthur: the Vita depicts Arthur as great and bold, but willful. Lifris writes that Cadoc gave protection to a man who had killed three of Arthur's soldiers and Arthur was awarded a herd of cattle from Cadoc as compensation. Cadoc delivered them, but when Arthur took possession of them they were transformed into bundles of ferns. Similar incidents are often described in mediaeval biographies such as those of Carannog, Padern and Goeznovius: miracles in dealings with temporal authority bolster the case for church freedom. In later Arthurian Welsh Triads Cadoc, with Illtud and Peredur, is one of three knights said to have become keepers of the Holy Grail.

The kings Maelgwn of Gwynedd and Rhain Dremrudd of Brycheiniog also feature in the Vita. Though Saint Cadoc's Church at Caerleon, which, though of Norman origin and much rebuilt, stands on the foundations of the Roman legion headquarters, may memorialize an early cell of Cadoc's. Caerleon was also associated with Arthur.

=== Other legends ===
A certain miraculous spot associated with Cadoc had a reputed healing effect until the time of king Hiuguel (Hywel vab weyn, who died in his old age ca. 1041–44) when, due to a malevolent influence, the spot was lost.

This Cadoc, grandson of Brychan Brycheiniog, to whose offspring a large number of south-west British cult sites are dedicated, may be identical to or confused with Cadoc son of Brychan, for whom the churches at Llanspyddid near Brecon and at Llangadog, Carmarthenshire, are said to be named along with a former chapel in the parish of Kidwelly. According to Serenus de Cressy this Cadoc died AD 490, is buried in France, and is commemorated in the Calendar on 24 January.

The epithet of Doeth (Welsh for wise) induced some writers to confound him with St. Sophias (Greek for wisdom), bishop of Beneventum in Italy. Hence he is said sometimes to have died at Bannaventa (Weedon, five kilometres east of Daventry in Northamptonshire). In an episode towards the end of his vita Cadoc is carried off in a cloud from Britannia (de terra Britannie) to Beneventum, where a certain prior is warned of the coming of a "western Briton" who is to be renamed Sophias; as Sophias Cadoc becomes abbot, bishop and martyr. A magna basilica was erected over his shrine, which visiting Britons were not allowed to enter. A fictitious "Pope Alexander" is made to figure in the narrative.

=== Legendary genealogy ===
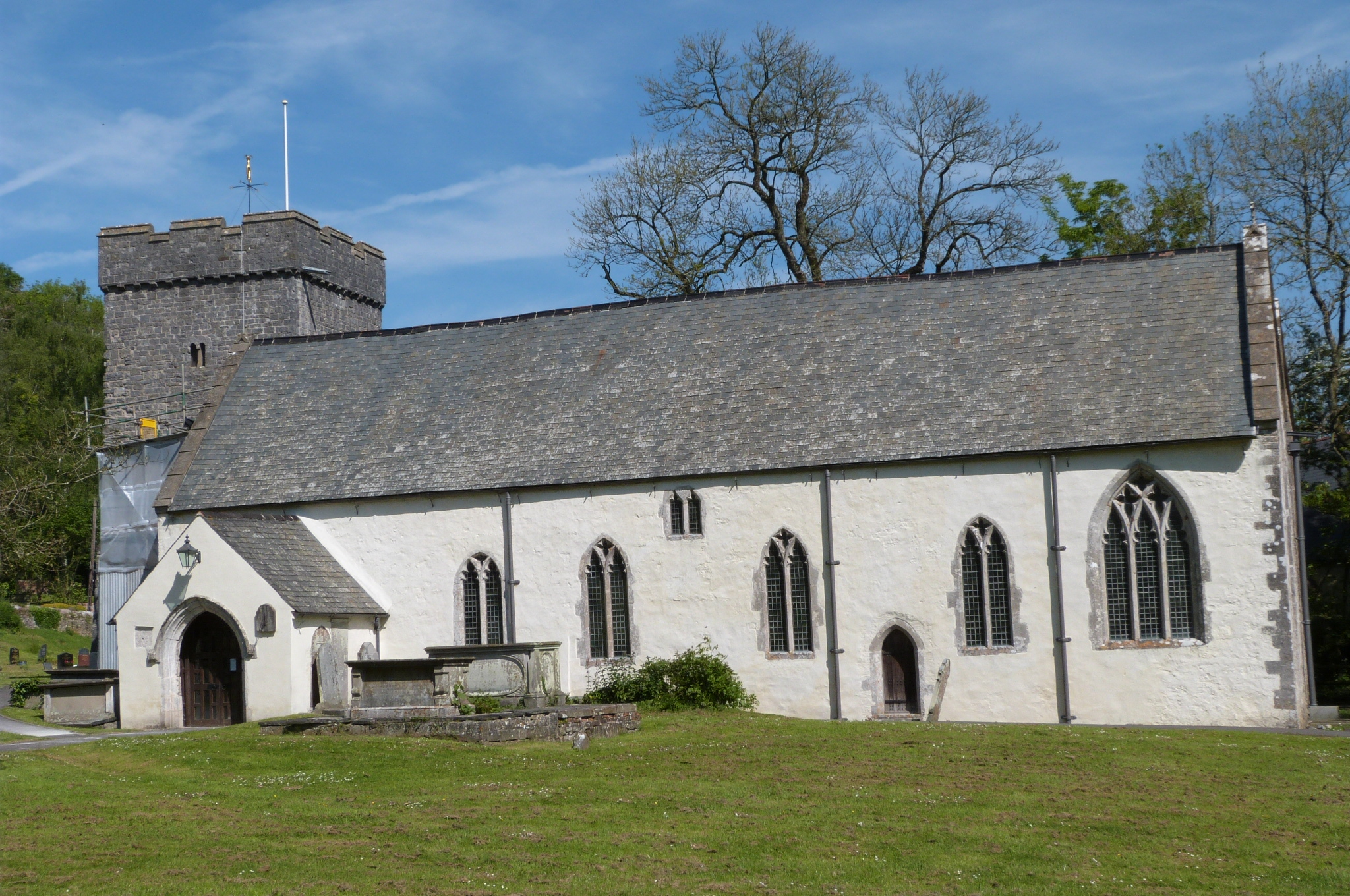
The parish church of St Cadoc, Llancarfan

In Lives of the Cambro British saints (1853), Rev W. J Rees wrote:

The genealogy of the blessed Cadoc arises from the most noble emperors of Rome, from the time of the incarnation of Jesus Christ, Augustus Cesar, in whose time Christ was born, begat Octavianus, Octavianus begat Tiberius, Tiberius begat Caius, Caius begat Claudius, Claudius begat Vespasian, Vespasian begat Titus, Titus begat Domitian, Domitian begat Nero, under whom the apostles Peter and Paul suffered, Nero begat Trajan, Trajan begat Adrian, Adrian begat Antonius, Antonius begat Commodus, Commodus begat Meobus, Meobus begat Severus, Severus begat Antonius, Antonius begat Aucanus, Aucanus begat Aurelian, Aurelian begat Alexander, Alexander begat Maximus, Maximus begat Gordian, Gordian begat Philip, Philip begat Decius, Decius begat Gallus, Callus begat Valerian, Valerian begat Cleopatra, Cleopatra begat Aurelian, Aurelian begat Titus, Titus begat Probus, Probus begat Carosius, Carosius begat Dioclesian, who persecuted the Christians throughout the whole world; for in his time the blessed martyrs Alban, that is Julian, Aaron, and many others suffered. Dioclesian begat Galerius, Galerius begat Constantine the Great the son of Helen, Constantine begat Constantius, Constantius begat Maximianus, with whom the British soldiers went from Britain, and he slew Gratian the Roman emperor, and held the government of all Europe; and he did not dismiss the soldiers, which he brought with him from Britain to return to their country on account of their bravery, but gave them many provinces and countries, that is from the pool which is on the top of the mountain of Jupiter to the city named Cantguic, and until the western mound that is Cruc Ochideint; and from those soldiers arose a nation which is called Lettau. Maximianus therefore begat Owain, Owain begat Nor, Nor begat Solor, Solor begat Glywys, Glywys begat Gwynlliw, Gwynlliw begat the most blessed Cadoc of whom we are speaking.

== Liturgical celebration ==
In the 2004 edition of the Roman Martyrology, Cadoc is listed among saints thought to have died on 21 September, with the Latin name Cadóci. He is mentioned as follows: 'In the monastery at Llancarfan in South Wales, Saint Cadoc the Abbot, under whose name many monasteries in Cornwall and Brittany were established.' He does not appear in the current Roman Catholic liturgical calendar of saints celebrated annually in Wales.

21 September is, however, the feast day of the Apostle Saint Matthew, and in Cardiff, St Cadoc's Day has traditionally been kept on 25 September; on the French Île de Saint-Cado, a major pardon is traditionally celebrated on the third Sunday in September. Elsewhere his traditional feast day is 24 January.

== See also ==
- Cambuslang
- Llancarfan, site of Cadoc's 6th century abbey
- St Cadoc's Hospital, Caerleon
- St Cadocs/Penygarn, electoral ward that also has a Saint Cadoc's church
- St Cadou
- St. Cadoc's Church, Glynneath
- St Cadoc's Church, Llangattock Lingoed
- Church of St Cadoc, Raglan, Monmouthshire
