= Llanfairpwllgwyngyll =

Village on the Isle of Anglesey, Wales

- Village
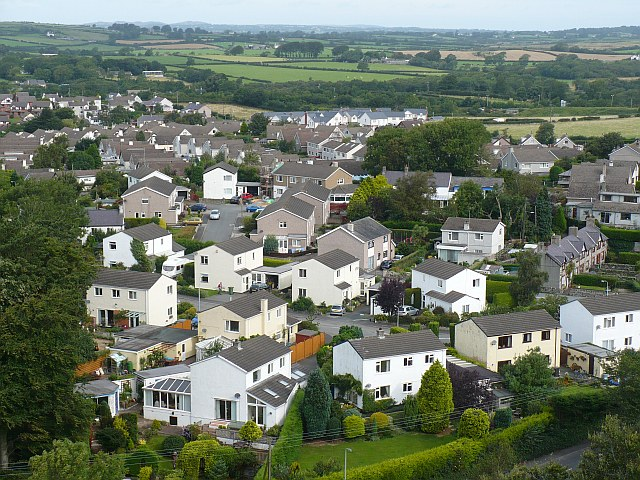
- Viewed from the Marquess of Anglesey's Column

- Location within Anglesey
- Population: 2,900 (2021 census)
- OS grid reference: SH528716
- Community: Llanfair Pwllgwyngyll
- Principal area: Isle of Anglesey
- Preserved county: Gwynedd
- Country: Wales
- Sovereign state: United Kingdom
- Post town: LLANFAIRPWLLGWYNGYLL
- Postcode district: LL61
- Dialling code: 01248
- Police: North Wales
- Fire: North Wales
- Ambulance: Welsh
- UK Parliament: Ynys Môn
- Senedd Cymru – Welsh Parliament: Bangor Conwy Môn
- List of places UK Wales Anglesey 53.2232°N 4.2008°W Map of the community

Llanfairpwllgwyngyll or Llanfair Pwllgwyngyll (Welsh: [ɬan.ˌvair.puɬˈɡwɨ̞n.ɡɨ̞ɬ]), often shortened to Llanfairpwll and sometimes to Llanfair PG, is a village and community on the Isle of Anglesey, Wales. It is located on the Menai Strait, next to the Britannia Bridge. At the 2011 Census the population was 3,107, of whom 71% could speak Welsh. As of the 2021 census, the population had decreased to 2,900 (rounded to the nearest 100). It is the sixth largest settlement in the county by population.

Llanfairpwllgwyngyllgogerychwyrndrobwllllantysiliogogogoch ([ˌɬan.vair.pʊɬ.ˌɡwɨ̞ŋ.ɡɨ̞ɬ.ɡɔ.ˌɡɛ.rə.ˌχwɨ̞rn.ˌdrɔ.bʊɬ.ˌɬan.tə.ˌsɪl.jɔˌɡɔ.ɡɔ.ˈɡoːχ]) is a lengthened form of the name, used in some contexts. With 58 characters split into 18 syllables, it is purported to be the longest name in Europe and the second longest one-word place name in the world.

== History ==
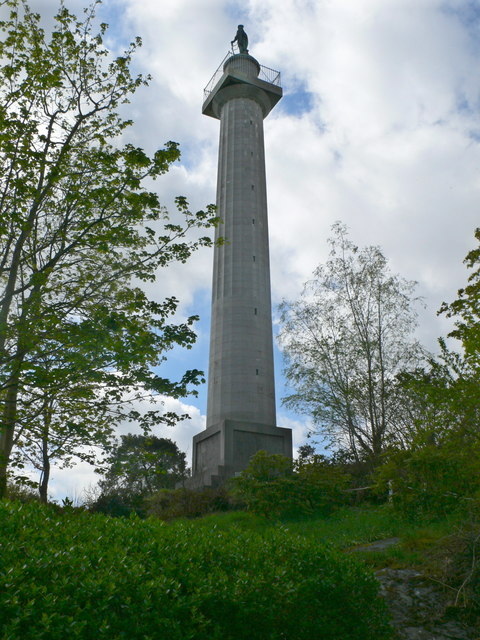
The Marquess of Anglesey's Column, designed by Thomas Harrison, celebrating the heroism of the 1st Marquess of Anglesey at the Battle of Waterloo. At 27 metres (89 ft) high, it offers views over Anglesey and the Menai Strait.

The area has been settled since the Neolithic era (4000–2000 BC), with subsistence agriculture and fishing being the most common occupations for much of its early history. The island of Anglesey was at that point reachable only by boat across the Menai Strait. A largely destroyed, collapsed dolmen can be found from this period in the parish, located at Ty Mawr north of the present-day church; early Ordnance Survey maps show a long cairn on the site. The probable remains of a hillfort, with a fragmentary bank and ditch, were recorded on an outcrop known as Craig y Ddinas.

The area was briefly invaded and captured by the Romans under Gaius Suetonius Paulinus, temporarily abandoned in order to consolidate forces against Boudicca, then held until the end of Roman Britain.

With the withdrawal of the Roman forces, the area fell under the control of the early medieval Kingdom of Gwynedd. There has likely been a small Christian religious site, perhaps a monastic cell, in the area since the 7th century. Surveys of the later medieval period show that the tenants of the township of Pwllgwyngyll, as it was then known, held a total of 9 bovates of land from the Bishop of Bangor under the feudal system. A church was built during the medieval period and dedicated to Mary, probably under Norman influence: the building, later demolished and replaced by a Victorian-era church, was unusual in having a semi-circular apse, a feature more usually associated with cathedrals. Despite religious activity, the rural nature of the settlement meant that the parish had a population of only around 80 in 1563.

Much of the land was absorbed into the Earldom of Uxbridge, which later became the Marquisate of Anglesey, and was subject to enclosures. In 1844, for example, 92% of the land in Llanfairpwll was owned by just three individuals. The population of the parish reached 385 by 1801.

In 1826, Anglesey was connected to the rest of Wales by the construction of the Menai Suspension Bridge by Thomas Telford, and connected with London in 1850 with the building of the Britannia Bridge and the busy North Wales Coast railway line, which connected the rest of Great Britain to the ferry port of Holyhead. The old village, known as 'Pentre Uchaf' ("upper village") was joined by new development around the railway station, which became known as 'Pentre Isaf', the "lower village".

The first meeting of the Women's Institute took place in Llanfairpwll in 1915, and the movement (which began in Canada) then spread through the rest of the British Isles.

== Placename and toponymy ==
The original name of the medieval township, within whose boundaries the present-day village lies, was Pwllgwyngyll, meaning "the pool of the white hazels". Pwllgwyngyll was one of two townships making up the parish, the other being Treforion; its name was first recorded as 'Piwllgunyl' in an ecclesiastical valuation conducted in the 1250s for the Bishop of Norwich. The parish name was recorded as Llanfair y Pwllgwyngyll ('Llanfair' meaning "[St.] Mary's church"; y meaning "(of) the") as far back as the mid 16th century, in Leland's Itinerary. The suffixing of the township name to that of the church would have served to distinguish the parish from the many other sites dedicated to Mary in Wales.

Longer versions of the name are thought to have first been used in the 19th century in an attempt to develop the village as a commercial and tourist centre. The long form of the name is the longest place name in the United Kingdom and one of the longest in the world at 58 characters (51 "letters" since "ch" and "ll" are digraphs, and are treated as single letters in the Welsh language). The village is still signposted Llanfairpwllgwyngyll, marked on Ordnance Survey maps as Llanfair Pwllgwyngyll and the railway station is officially named Llanfairpwll, a form used by local residents. The name is also shortened to Llanfair PG, sufficient to distinguish it from other places in Wales called Llanfair (meaning "[St.] Mary's church").

=== 19th-century renaming ===
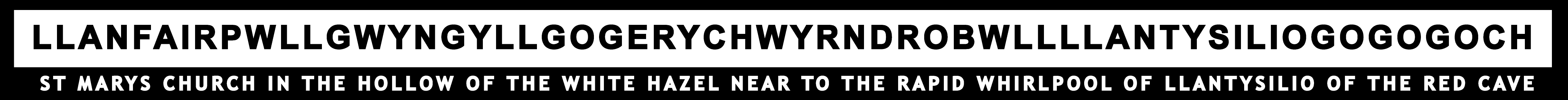
Illustration of a sign showing the name and English translation

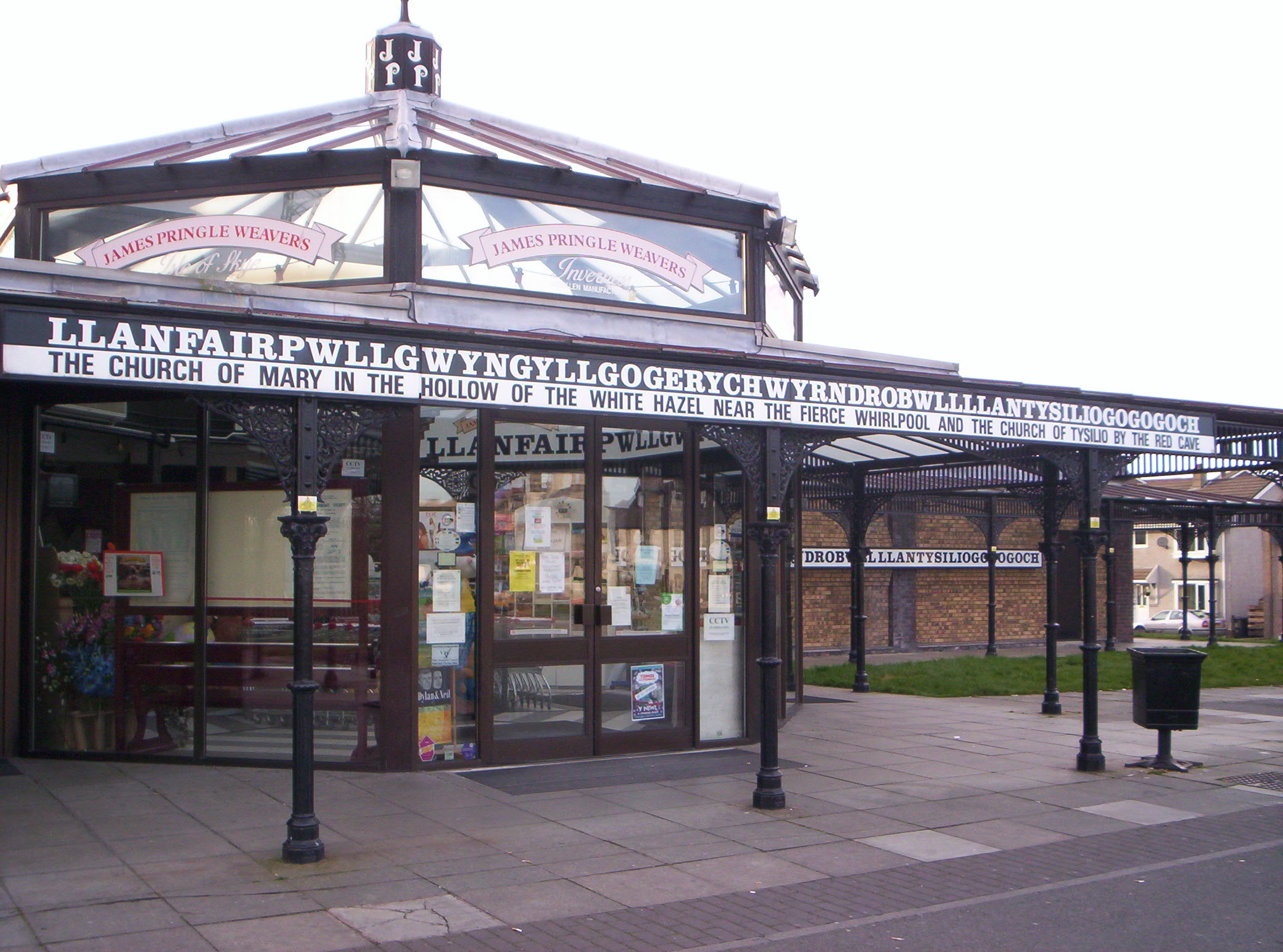
James Pringle Weavers shop with English translation of the name

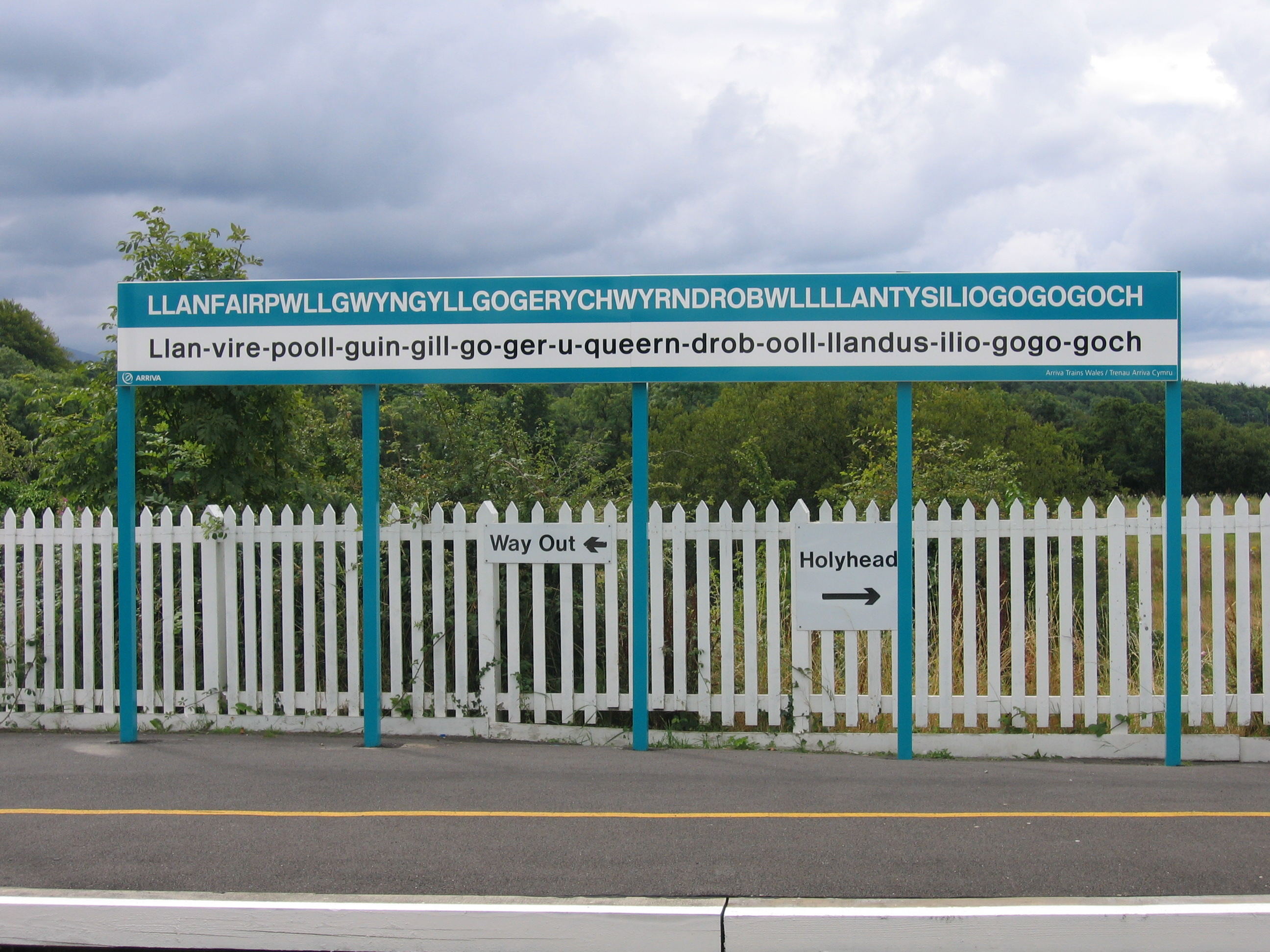
The sign at the railway station gives an approximation of the correct pronunciation for English speakers.

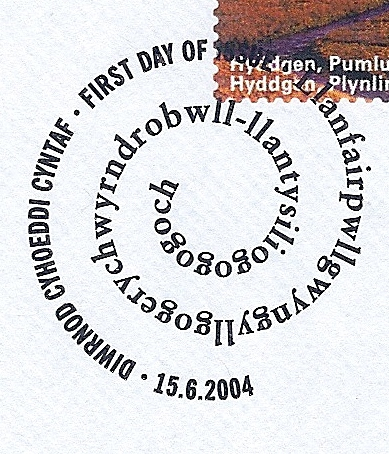
Postmark from the village

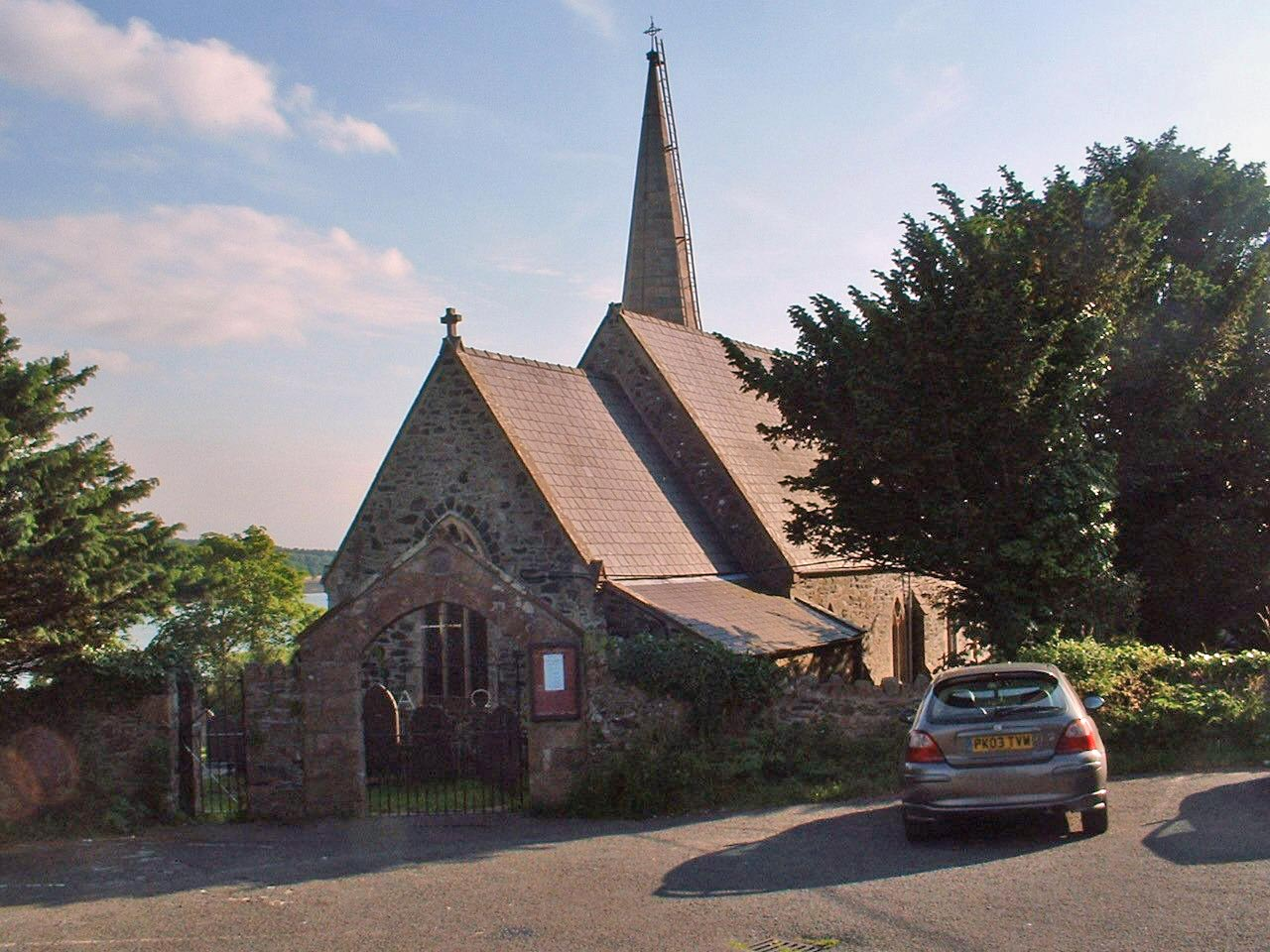
St Mary's Church

The long name was supposedly contrived in 1869 as an early publicity stunt to give the station the longest name of any railway station in Britain. According to Sir John Morris-Jones the name was created by a local tailor, whose name he did not confide, letting the secret die with him. This form of the name adds a reference to the whirlpool in the Menai Strait known as the Swellies and to the small chapel of St. Tysilio, located on a nearby island. The final -gogogoch ("red cave") is supposed to have been an addition inspired by the Cardiganshire parish of Llandysiliogogo, rather than by any local features.

Literally translated, the long form of the name means: "[The] church of [St.] Mary (Llanfair) [of the] pool (pwll) (Note: pwll - "pool, pond, pit") of the white hazels (gwyn gyll) near to [lit. "over against"] (go ger) the fierce whirlpool (y chwyrn drobwll) [and] the church of [St.] Tysilio (Llantysilio) of the red cave (gogo[f] goch)". Various elements have occasionally been translated differently, for example "the white pool among the hazel trees" or "the cave of St Tysilio the Red".

The true originator and date of the longer version of the name is less certain, however: an ecclesiastical directory published a few years before the claimed renaming gives what it calls the "full" parish name in the slightly differing form of Llanfairpwllgwyngyllgogerbwlltysiliogogo ("St Mary's church of the pool of the white hazels over against the pool of St Tysilio Gogo [Tysilio of the cave]"), while Llan-vair-pwll-gwyn-gyll-goger-bwll-dysilio-gogo appears in a paper on placenames published in 1849, its author noting that "the name was generally abridged" by locals. While the addition regarding the Swellies is supposed only to have been made in the 1860s, early 19th century guidebooks had already suggested a derivation of the element pwllgwyngyll from pwll, gwyn and gwyll ("gloomy raging pool"), in reference to the Swellies.

=== Tourism and attractions ===
A few thousand local residents welcome about 200,000 visitors per year. The most popular attraction is the Llanfairpwll railway station that features the plate with the full name of the village. Other places of interest in the area include Anglesey Sea Zoo, Bryn Celli Ddu Burial Chamber, St. Tysilio's Church, and Plas Cadnant Hidden Gardens.

=== In science ===
In 2020, a new species of bacteria isolated from soil collected in the parish of the village was placed in the Myxococcus genus and was named Myxococcus llanfairpwllgwyngyllgogerychwyrndrobwllllantysiliogogogochensis.

=== In popular culture ===
In his 1957 appearance on You Bet Your Life, the Welsh academic John Hughes answered host Groucho Marx's question about the location of his birthplace by mentioning the town.

In the 1966 Stephen Sondheim-penned song "The Boy From...", the singer details her unrequited love for a boy from the (fictional) island of Tacarembo la Tumbe del Fuego Santa Malipas Zacatecas la Junta del Sol y Cruz. The final verse includes the lyric: "Tomorrow he sails/He's moving to Wales/To live in Llanfairpwllgwyngyllgogerychwyrndrobwllllantysiliogogogoch" (with the very last line of the song simply being the exhortation, "och!"). Part of the song's humour stems from the singer's attempts to catch her breath after repeatedly singing the unwieldy place names.

In the 1968 movie Barbarella, Dildano proposes that the password for a meeting is "Llanfairpwllgwyngyllgogerychwyrndrobwllllantysiliogogogoch".

The name was submitted to Guinness World Records as the longest word to appear in a published cryptic crossword, having been used by compiler Roger Squires in 1979. The clue was "Giggling troll follows Clancy, Larry, Billy and Peggy who howl, wrongly disturbing a place in Wales (58)", where all but the last five words formed an anagram.

In the 1980s, the village's name was the subject of a question on the American quiz show $ale of the Century. Host Jim Perry later showed a giant cue card bearing the name of the village, he explained what each part of the name meant before joking "and it's pronounced...exactly the way you think it is!"

In 1995, Welsh band Super Furry Animals released its debut EP, Llanfairpwllgwyngyllgogerychwyrndrobwllantysiliogogogochynygofod (In Space).

The English translation of the village’s name is included as a lyric in the song Red Cave by the American experimental rock band Yeasayer, the final track on their 2007 debut album All Hour Cymbals.

In 2025 the video game Helldivers 2 added a city for players to defend called Llanfairpwllgwyngyllgogerychwyrndrobwllllantysiliogogogoch II.

== Climate ==
The village has a temperate oceanic climate (Köppen Cfb; Trewartha Do), with mild summers and cool, wet winters.

Climate data for Llanfairpwllgwyngyll, 1961–1990, Altitude: 15 metres above mean sea level
Month	Jan	Feb	Mar	Apr	May	Jun	Jul	Aug	Sep	Oct	Nov	Dec	Year
Record high °C (°F)	16 (61)	17 (63)	22 (72)	24 (75)	28 (82)	29 (84)	31 (88)	34 (93)	27 (81)	25 (77)	18 (64)	17 (63)	34 (93)
Mean daily maximum °C (°F)	7.7 (45.9)	8.0 (46.4)	9.7 (49.5)	12.1 (53.8)	15.2 (59.4)	17.9 (64.2)	19.4 (66.9)	19.3 (66.7)	17.4 (63.3)	14.6 (58.3)	10.5 (50.9)	8.7 (47.7)	13.4 (56.1)
Daily mean °C (°F)	5.2 (41.4)	5.1 (41.2)	6.6 (43.9)	8.5 (47.3)	11.3 (52.3)	14.0 (57.2)	15.7 (60.3)	15.6 (60.1)	13.9 (57.0)	11.5 (52.7)	7.8 (46.0)	6.1 (43.0)	10.1 (50.2)
Mean daily minimum °C (°F)	2.6 (36.7)	2.2 (36.0)	3.4 (38.1)	4.9 (40.8)	7.4 (45.3)	10.1 (50.2)	11.9 (53.4)	11.9 (53.4)	10.4 (50.7)	8.3 (46.9)	5.0 (41.0)	3.5 (38.3)	6.8 (44.2)
Record low °C (°F)	−9 (16)	−8 (18)	−7 (19)	−3 (27)	−1 (30)	2 (36)	5 (41)	4 (39)	1 (34)	−1 (30)	−4 (25)	−8 (18)	−9 (16)
Average rainfall mm (inches)	107 (4.2)	72 (2.8)	85 (3.3)	65 (2.6)	65 (2.6)	68 (2.7)	74 (2.9)	95 (3.7)	98 (3.9)	120 (4.7)	130 (5.1)	123 (4.8)	1,102 (43.3)
Average rainy days (≥ 0.2 mm)	19.7	15.0	18.9	14.1	18.9	13.7	13.1	15.1	15.8	18.7	19.5	19.5	202
Average snowy days	2.9	3.1	1.7	0.7	0.1	0.0	0.0	0.0	0.0	0.0	0.4	1.6	10.5
Mean monthly sunshine hours	49.6	73.5	105.4	153.0	195.3	183.0	173.6	164.3	126.0	93.0	57.0	40.3	1,414
Source: Met Office

Climate data for Llanfairpwllgwyngyll, 1961–1990, Altitude: 15 metres above mean sea level
Month	Jan	Feb	Mar	Apr	May	Jun	Jul	Aug	Sep	Oct	Nov	Dec	Year
Average rainy days (≥ 1.0 mm)	15.6	11.2	13.0	10.4	10.9	10.3	9.4	11.7	12.3	15.0	15.7	15.1	150.6
Source: Met Office

Climate data for Llanfairpwllgwyngyll, 1961–1990, Altitude: 15 metres above mean sea level
Month	Jan	Feb	Mar	Apr	May	Jun	Jul	Aug	Sep	Oct	Nov	Dec	Year
Average rainy days (≥ 10.0 mm)	2.5	1.7	2.0	1.5	1.2	1.6	2.2	2.7	2.8	3.4	3.8	3.5	28.9
Source: Met Office

== Notable people ==
- Wilfred Mitford Davies (1895–1966), Welsh artist and publisher, went to school in the town.
- Sir John "Kyffin" Williams, KBE, RA (1918–2006), Welsh landscape painter, lived at Pwllfanogl, Llanfairpwll.
- Lady Rose McLaren (1919–2005), aristocrat, 4th daughter of the 6th Marquess of Anglesey, resided in Plas Newydd.
- John Lasarus Williams (1924–2004), known as John L, was a Welsh nationalist activist.
- Naomi Watts (born 1968), English actress and film producer, lived in the town as a child.
- Taron Egerton (born 1989), Welsh actor, went to school in the town.
- Siobhan Owen (born 1993), soprano and harpist from Llanfairpwll who now lives in Adelaide, emigrated aged two.
- Elin Fflur (born 1984), Welsh singer-songwriter, television and radio presenter.

== See also ==
- Llanfairpwll F.C., the village's football club
- List of long place names
- Taumatawhakatangihangakoauauotamateaturipukakapikimaungahoronukupokaiwhenuakitanatahu, a hill near Pōrangahau, New Zealand
