= Afon Cadnant =

River on Anglesey, Wales

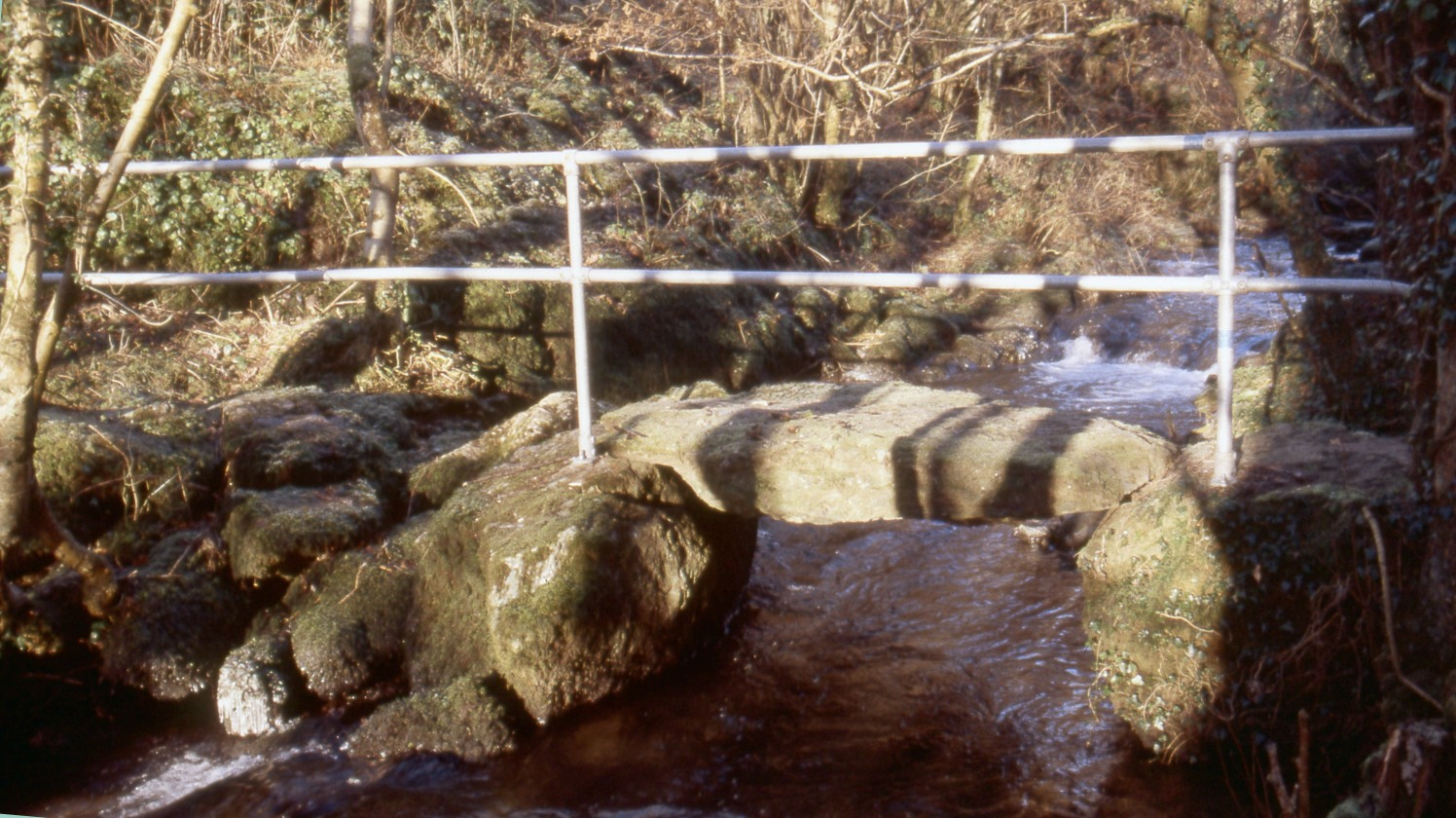
- Clapper bridge over Afon Cadnant

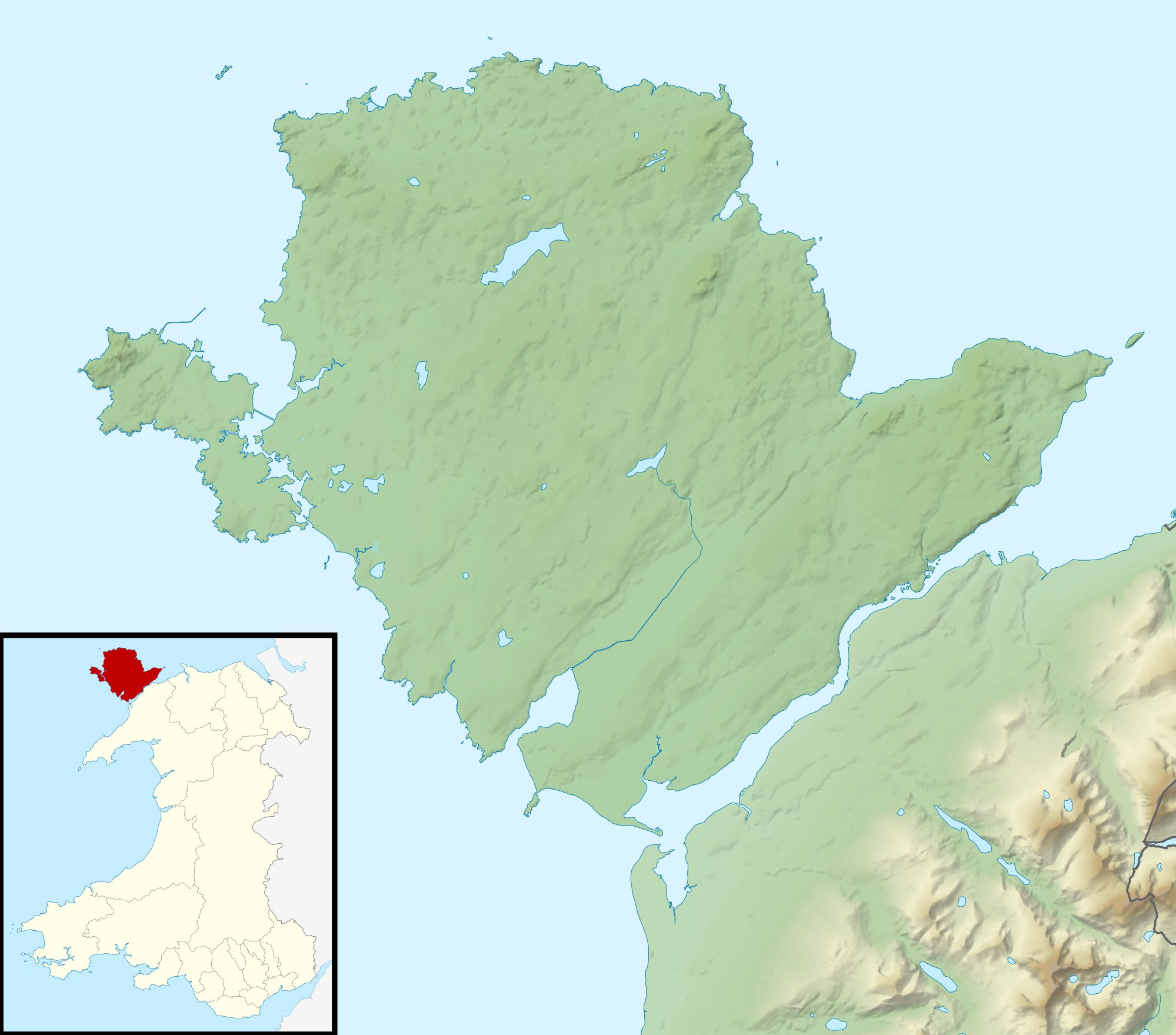
- Location on Anglesey

Location
- Country: Wales

Physical characteristics
- Mouth: Menai Strait

Afon Cadnant (Welsh for 'River Cadnant') is a small river on Anglesey, North Wales, which drains to the Menai Strait about 1 km (0.62 mi) northeast of the Menai Suspension Bridge. The river drains a largely agricultural area from Llandegfan to Llansadwrn and beyond, with feeder tributaries extending up towards Pentraeth forest.

Within the catchment are some artificial fishing ponds and a number of beef and dairy farms.

More notable are the remains and ruins of a number of water mills, especially in the lower section before the river enters the strait. Up until the end of the 18th century, it appears that great efforts were made to extract all the energy from the river to grind corn. This reflects the history of Anglesey as the bread-basket of Wales.

== Cadnant Dingle ==
The lower section known as Cadnant Dingle is a steep sided densely wooded valley with very restricted access. It is a designated SSSI as a representative example of the Brachypodium sylvaticum, Oak / Ash (slender falsebrome oak/ash) group of broadleaved woodlands.

Within the dingle and on the adjacent land is Plas Cadnant, a historical estate now noted for its extensive gardens.

At the mouth of the river, there is a small group of houses called Cwm Cadnant below which is a modern bridge carrying the main road to Beaumaris. Before the construction of the Menai Suspension Bridge, this was an important landing stage for boats carrying milled corn to the mainland. It was also the staging place for the Bishop of Bangor as he moved between his palace at Glyn Garth on Anglesey and his cathedral at Bangor.

Further upstream from the old bridge, there is an old smithy, a few workers cottages and a slate mill dating from 1820.
