= Albert Evans-Jones =

Welsh poet

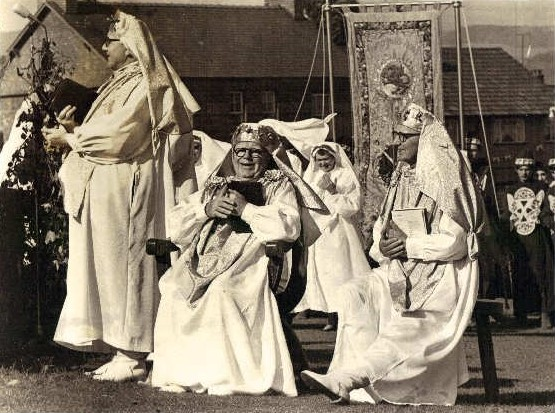
The Archdruid Cynan (middle) at the National Eisteddfod at Aberdare, 1956.

Sir (Albert) Cynan Evans-Jones CBE (14 April 1895 – 26 January 1970), more commonly known within Wales by his bardic name of Cynan, was a Welsh poet and dramatist.

== Early life ==
Cynan was born in Pwllheli as Albert Evan Jones, the son of Richard Albert Jones and Hannah Jane (née Evans). His father was the proprietor of the Central Restaurant in Penlan Street, Pwllheli. He was educated at Pwllheli Grammar School and the University College of North Wales at Bangor, where he graduated in 1916.

== First World War ==
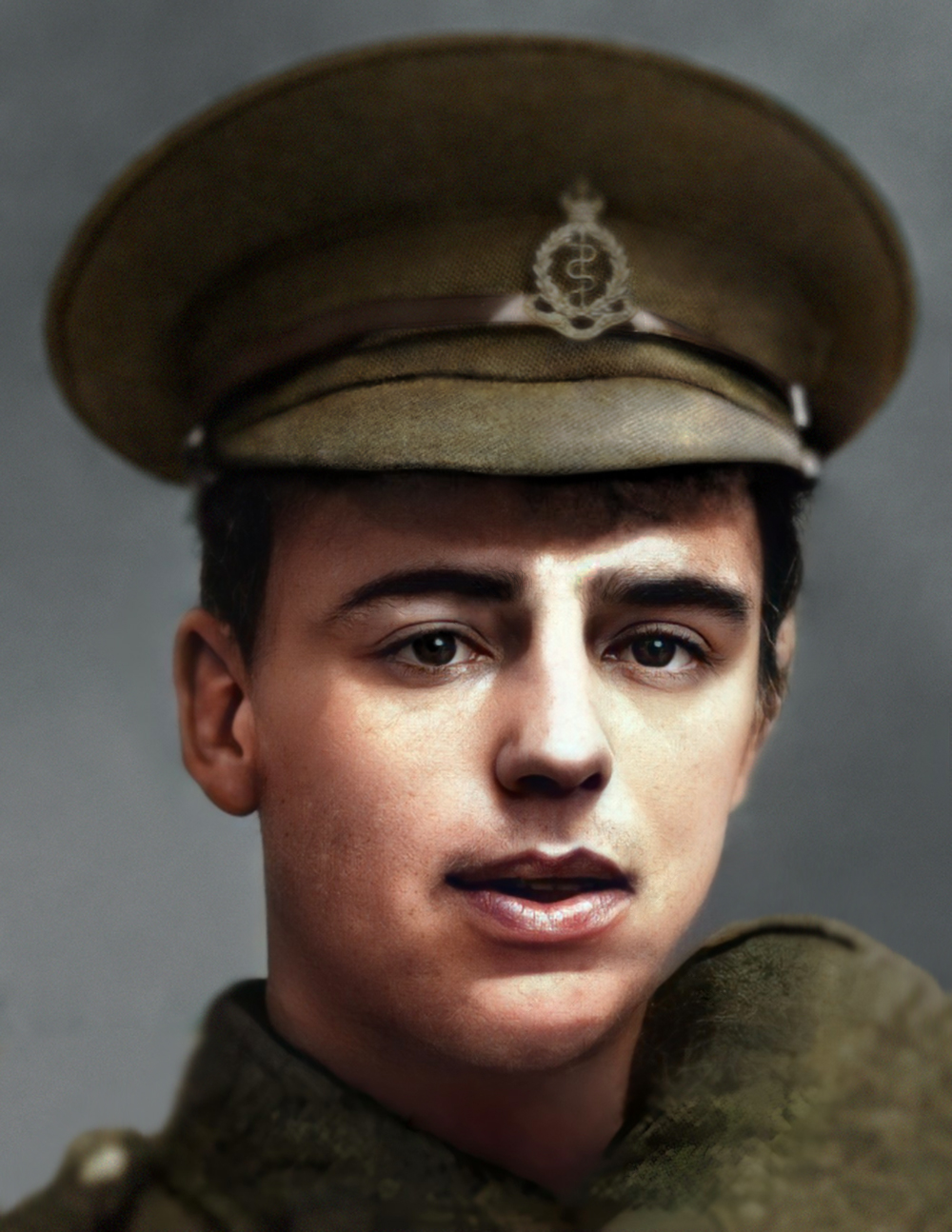
A portrait of Albert Evans-Jones (Cynan) in his military uniform (Circa 1916)

On graduation Cynan joined the Welsh Student Company of the RAMC, serving in Salonika and France, initially as an ambulance man and then as the company's military chaplain. His wartime experience had a profound effect on his poetic works, to such an extent that Alan Llwyd claims that Cynan, not Hedd Wyn, is the premier Welsh war poet of the First World War. Hedd Wyn's poems relating to the war were written before he had enlisted and he was killed before he could recount his experience of the war in his muse. Cynan, however, gives the best descriptions of the gritty atrocities of war, and the impact of war on a man's body as well as his spirit.

== Post-war career ==
After the war, Cynan entered college in Pwllheli to train for the ministry of the Presbyterian Church of Wales. He was ordained at Penmaenmawr, Caernarfonshire, in 1920 where he served as minister until 1931 when he relinquished his calling having been appointed a tutor in the Extramural Department of the University College of North Wales specialising in Drama and Welsh Literature. Despite having given up his ministry Cynan continued to accept regular preaching engagements, and was one of the most popular preachers of his day on the nonconformist preaching circuit in Wales. On 4 June 1923, Cynan was initiated into Freemasonry in Penmaenmawr Lodge No.4417.

Whilst working in the university, Cynan lived in Menai Bridge, Anglesey, but in his best known poem he expressed a wish to retire to Aberdaron, Caernarfonshire,

Pan fwyf yn hen a pharchus
Ac arian yn fy nghod,
A phob beirniadaeth drosodd
A phawb yn canu 'nghlod
Mi brynaf fwthyn unig
Heb ddim o flaen y ddôr.
Ond creigiau Aberdaron
A thonnau gwyllt y môr

Translation:

When I am old and reverend
With money to my name,
With all my judgments over
Yet basking in my fame:
I'll buy a lonely cottage
With nothing 'fore its door,
But the rocks of Aberdaron
And the ocean's maddened roar.

— Translated by Robin ap Cynan

== Drama ==
Apart from being an important figure in Welsh poetic circles Cynan was also influential in the field of Welsh drama. He wrote two full-length plays: Hywel Harris won the premier Eisteddfod prize for drama in 1931. He was commissioned to write an exemplary play for the National Eisteddfod in 1957 – his offering Absolom Fy Mab was accepted to great critical acclaim in Welsh dramatic circles as were his translations of English Language plays John Masefield's Good Friday and Norman Nicholson's The Old Man of the Mountain.

In 1931 he was appointed Reader of Welsh plays on behalf of the Lord Chamberlain, a post which he held till the abolition of censorship in 1968. He was seen as a liberal censor, having allowed James Kitchener Davies' controversial drama Cwm Glo to be performed after it won the drama prize in the 1934 Eisteddfod.

Cynan made regular appearances on Welsh language radio and TV programmes, and he was the subject of the first Colour TV programme broadcast in the Welsh Language Llanc o Lŷn.

== National Eisteddfod ==
Cynan is best known for his huge influence in the modernisation of the National Eisteddfod. He was Archdruid twice. He was the only person to have been elected to the position for a second term. His two terms were from 1950 till 1954 and from 1963 till 1966. He was the Recorder of the Gorsedd of Bards in 1935, and joint-secretary of the National Eisteddfod Council in 1937.

He was the First Archdruid to accept that the Gorsedd was an 18th-century invention by Iolo Morganwg and that it had no links to Welsh mythology or to the ancient Druids, thus healing rifts between the academic and ecclesiastical establishments and the Eisteddfod movement.

Cynan is also responsible for designing the modern ceremonies of the Crowning and the Chairing of the Bard in the Eisteddfod as they are now performed, by creating ceremonies which, he thought, better reflected the Christian beliefs of the Welsh people.

Cynan was also prominent as a National Eisteddfod competitor. He won the Bardic Crown in 1921 at the Caernarfon National Eisteddfod for his poem Mab y Bwthyn ("A Cottage Son"), which recounted his experiences in the Great War. He won the Crown for his poem Yr Ynys Unig ("The Lonely Isle") in the Mold Eisteddfod of 1923; his third crowned poem, Y Dyrfa / The Crowd ( Bangor 1931 ), described a rugby match – the first time such a topic was attempted in Welsh poetry.

To add to his three crowns Cynan was also awarded the Bardic Chair in 1924 for a poem I'r Duw nid adwaenir ("To the Unknown God"), which is the only time that the chair has been awarded for an awdl that was not written according to the rules of Cynghanedd.

Cynan also adjudicated many times at the National Eisteddfod.

== Honours ==
Cynan was awarded the honorary degree of D.Litt. by the University of Wales in 1961.

He was awarded the freedom of the borough of Pwllheli in 1963.

He was appointed CBE in 1949, and elevated to Knight Bachelor in 1969.

== Marriage ==
Cynan was married twice. His first marriage, in 1921, was to Ellen J. Jones of Pwllheli and they had one son and one daughter; Ellen died in 1962 and he married Menna Meirion Jones of Valley, Anglesey the following year.

== Death and burial ==
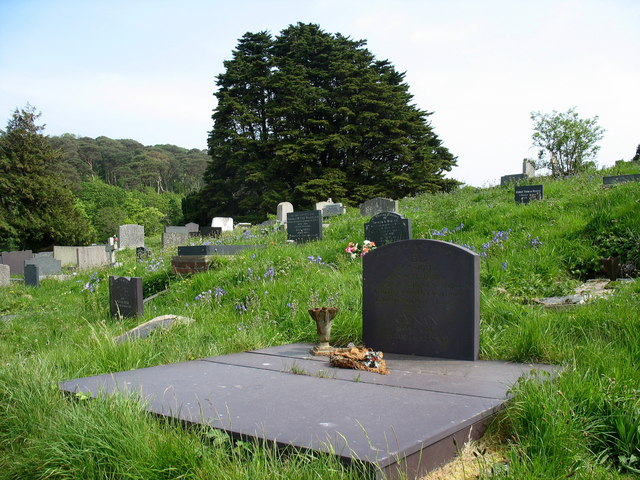
Bedd Cynan. Cynan's Grave at Church Island

Cynan died on 26 January 1970 and was buried in the yard of St Tysilio's Church, Menai Bridge, Church Island, Menai Strait, Anglesey.

== In translation ==
Ballade by the War Memorial.
(A Speech that would not be heard on Armistice Day).
By Albert Evans-Jones.
Translated by Alan Llwyd.

From ghostly realms I come, a shade,
On your dead sons' behalf, to see
What honour, praise, or accolade:
We would return to, not that we
Would wish for your false eulogy.
But what is this? – the old, old lie
On stones to shame our memory:
"For one's own land, it's sweet to die."

When the wild heart of youth was made
Tame by the clumsy artistry
Of some rough blacksmith's bayonet blade
Or the hot bullet's ecstasy,
Or when the shells whined endlessly,
And then became a colder cry,
Would you still sing so joyously:
"For one's own land, it's sweet to die?

But it is sweet to be dismayed
On seeing those whom we made free
Through war grown wealthy, while, betrayed,
My friends who fought for victory
Now starve: I'd break these stones to be
Bread for old comrades of days gone by
While you still sing with so much glee:
"For one's own land it's sweet to die."

L'Envoi.
Friend, in the colours of the O.T.C.,
One day you will remember why
I challenged such hypocrisy:
"For one's own land, it's sweet to die."

== Works ==
=== Poetry ===
- Telyn y Nos (1921)
- Caniadau (1927)

=== Plays ===
- Hywel Harris (1932)
- Hen Ŵr y Mynydd (Translation, 1949)
- Absalom Fy Mab (1957)

=== Novels ===
- Ffarwel Weledig (1946)

Preceded by William Evans (Wil Ifan)	Archdruid of the National Eisteddfod of Wales; 1950–1953	Succeeded by John Dyfnallt Owen
Preceded by Edgar Phillips	1963–1966	Succeeded by E. Gwyndaf Evans
