= Wilfred Mitford Davies =

Welsh artist and publisher

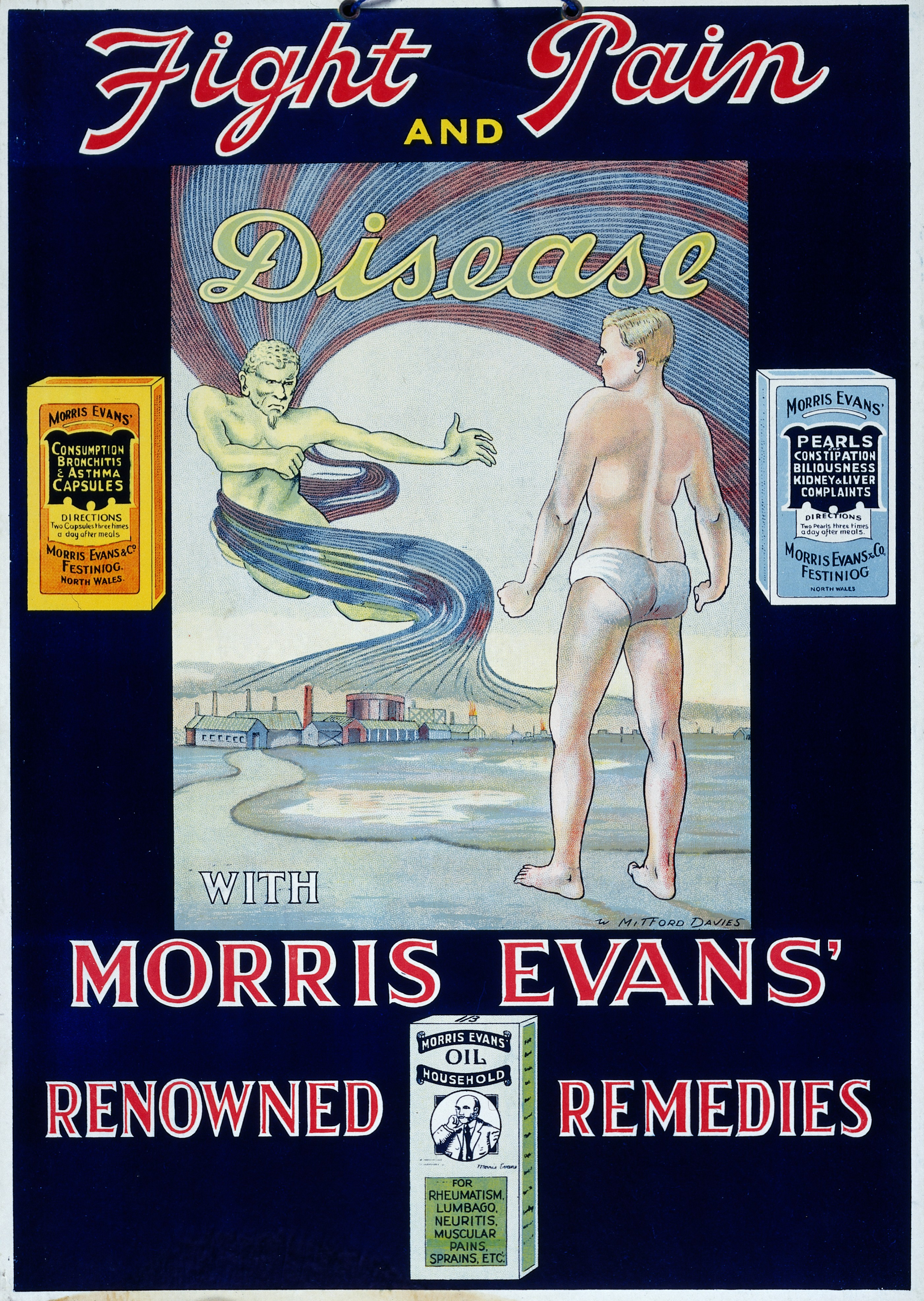
Colour lithograph incorporating a design by Wilfred Mitford Davies. It is advertising the use of Morris Evans' remedies, which were manufactured in Ffestiniog, North Wales.

Wilfred Mitford Davies (23 February 1895 – March 15, 1966) was a Welsh artist and publisher, best known for his work with the Cymru'r Plant imprint to produce children's reading matter in the Welsh language.

Davies was born at Menai Bridge, Anglesey, and brought up in the village of Star. He went to school at Llanfairpwll and Llangefni, and hoped to become an architect. He served in the army during World War I, and afterwards studied at Liverpool School of Art, returning to his home village of Star in the early 1920s. He was approached by Ifan ab Owen Edwards to produce children's cartoon characters for the newly launched Cymru'r Plant magazine. His characters Toodles and Twm y Gath ("Tom the Cat") were later used in Breton children's publications. He illustrated many children's books, as well as providing cartoons for newspapers and magazines. He also produced landscape paintings, mostly of North Wales.
