= Swellies =

Stretch of the Menai Strait, North Wales

Coordinates: 53°13′13″N 4°10′22″W

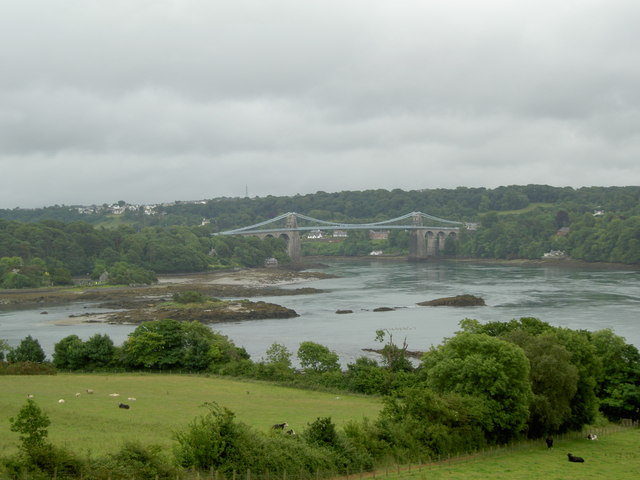
The infamous Swellies. The hazards of this crossing were the driving force which led to the creation of Telford's suspension bridge

The Swellies or Swillies (Welsh: Pwll Ceris) is an area of treacherous water in the Menai Strait, Wales, most commonly referring to the stretch between the Britannia Bridge and the Menai Bridge.

== Description ==
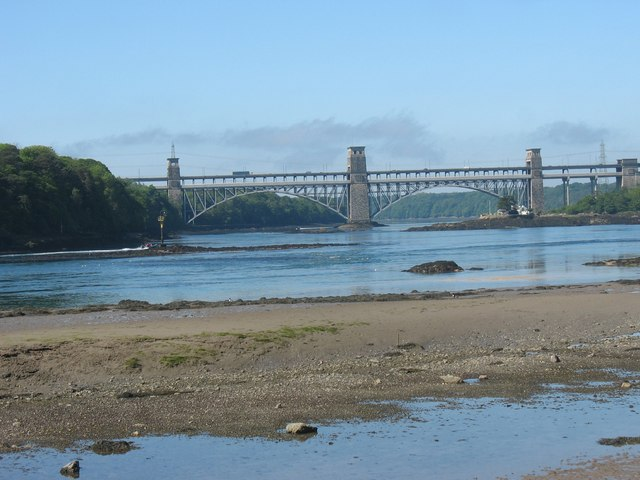
The Swellies from the Belgian Promenade

It is notable for its difficulty in safely navigating its shoals and rocks due to the whirlpools and surges that are the result of the tides washing around the island of Anglesey at different speeds. There are several small islands in The Swellies, the largest of which are Church Island (Welsh: Ynys Dysilio) and Welsh: Ynys Gored Goch (Red Weir Island in English but also known as Whitebait Island).

== In Welsh literature ==
The Welsh name (variously spelled as "Pwll Ceris", "Pwll Cerys" or "Cerys bwll"), has been in popular usage since at least the sixteenth century when it became the subject for a number of poetic works by Welsh bards. Some of these works were reprinted in The Cambro-Briton journal in 1806, including works by the notable bards Gruffudd Hiraethog and Huw Roberts Len. These works would again be republished throughout the nineteenth century, including as part of thirteen englynion on Pwll Ceris published in the journal Y Grael in 1820. In 1804, Richard Llwyd published another well known Englyn "On Pwll Ceris, the Vortex in the Menai"

"Cerys bwll, megys am eigion - y trai
Troad chwrli gwgon;
Crwydrad dwvr yn cordroi ton,
Ceulwnc i ofni calon.

Perygl ar for-bwll, myn Peris, rodio,
Val rhoi hoedl ar y dis;
Peryglad from uch fris,
Pwy all caru Pwll Ceris.

Cau arw ddwfryn cerwyn ddull,
Caled o bwnc gwaelod bell;
Croes Duw deg, Crîft a'i waed oll,
Croefa bawb rhag Cerys Bwll."

- Gruffudd Hiraethog, sixteenth century

A medieval document quoted in the 2003 book The Menai Strait (translated from the 2003 Welsh original Y Fenai) by Gwyn Pari Huws and Terry Beggs (Gwasg Gomer Press) states: "In that arm of the see that departeth between this island Mon and North Wales is a swelowe that draweth to schippes that seileth and sweloweth hem yn, as doth Scylla and Charybdis – therefore we may nouzt seile by this swalowe but slily at the full see."

== See also ==
- Menai Suspension Bridge
- The Swellies in the name of Llanfairpwllgwyngyll
