= Marquess of Anglesey's Column =

- Tŵr Marcwis (Welsh)
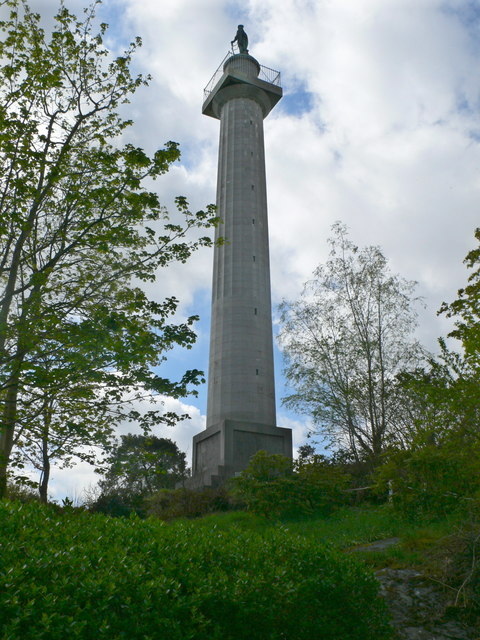

- Location within Anglesey
- 53.2208°N 4.1967°W
- Type: Monument
- Location: Anglesey, Wales
- OS grid reference: SH 5343 7156

History
- Built: 1817

Listed Building – Grade II*
- Official name: Anglesey Column
- Designated: 5 February 1952
- Reference no.: 5432
- Community: Llanfair Pwllgwyngyll

The Marquess of Anglesey's Column, or Anglesey Column (Welsh: Tŵr Marcwis), is a Doric column near Llanfairpwllgwyngyll on the island of Anglesey, Wales. It commemorates the military achievements in the Napoleonic Wars of Henry William Paget, the first marquess of Anglesey, who is depicted in the statue at the top of the column. The column is a Grade II* listed building.

== Column ==
The 27-metre-high (89 ft) monument consists of 115 steps. It was designed by Thomas Harrison and erected in 1817. It overlooks the Menai Strait and is situated near Plas Newydd, a country house belonging to Paget. On the foundation stone there is an inscription in English, Welsh and Latin:

The inhabitants of the counties of Anglesey and Caernarvon have erected this column in grateful commemoration of the distinguished military achievements of their countryman HENRY WILLIAM, MARQUESS OF ANGLESEY the leader of the British Cavalry in Spain throughout the arduous Campaign of 1807 and Second in Command of the Armies confederated against France at the memorable battle of Waterloo on the 18th of June 1815. Thomas Harrison Architect.

During the battle of Waterloo, Paget (at that time Earl of Uxbridge) lost his leg to a cannonball hit. It is claimed he turned to Arthur Wellesley, 1st Duke of Wellington when his leg was hit, and exclaimed, "By God, sir, I've lost my leg!" – to which Wellington replied, "By God, sir, so you have!" Paget was later fitted with the first ever articulated wooden leg.

The column stands on an outcrop of blueschist rock, formed when pillow lavas were metamorphosed under high pressure but at relatively low temperature. This example is amongst the oldest known in the world, and in 2010 the site was declared a Geological Site of Special Scientific Interest. It is a significant feature of the GeoMôn UNESCO Global Geopark.

== Statue ==
The monument was not completed until 1860 (after the Marquess had died) when the brass sculpture at the top was added. It was sculpted by Matthew Noble.

== Decline and restoration attempts ==
In recent years, the condition of the column has deteriorated. Many of the wooden steps in the tower have rotted, and pose a severe fire risk. As a result, the column closed to the public in March 2012, with no formal restoration proposals agreed. The last 'column keeper' was David Blackmore who lived in the cottage and took care of the site for 20 years.

In 2017, the 200th year of the column's life, a charity, the Anglesey Column Trust, was set up to look into the possibility of repairing and re-opening the column. In 2018, £60,000 funding from the National Lottery was awarded towards restoring the column which was used to further assess work needed and prepare further funding applications. In September 2020, £19,300 was granted by the National Lottery Heritage Fund's Emergency section for the installation of CCTV and other security features. In July 2021 the largest grant to date of £872,000 was given. This will allow not only the re-opening of the column but parking to be made available, a visitor centre opened in the cottage and a viewing platform for disabled visitors. It is hoped six new jobs will be created.
