= Victoria Hotel, Menai Bridge =

Grade II listed building in Anglesey, UK

Coordinates: 53.2244°N 4.1617°W

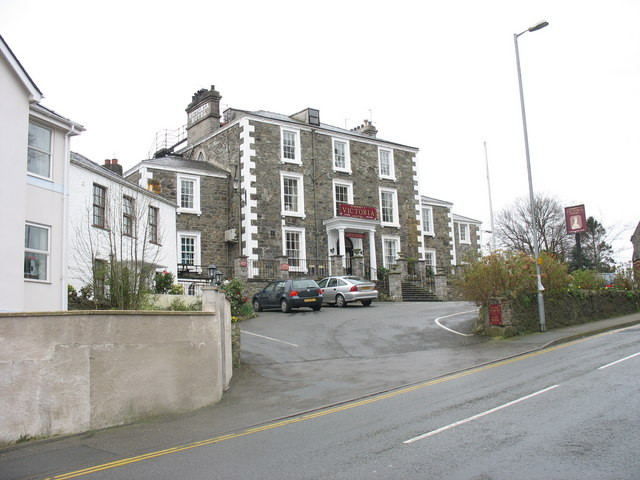

The Victoria Hotel is a historic Grade II listed hotel and pub in Menai Bridge, Anglesey, Wales.

Since 2022 it has been part of the Chef & Brewer chain.
