= Hugh Williams (historian) =

Welsh church historian, tutor and minister

Hugh Williams (1843–1911) was a Welsh church historian and college tutor, known also as a Presbyterian minister.

== Life ==
The son of Hugh Williams (d. 1905, aged ninety-two), carrier and small freeholder, of Menai Bridge, Anglesey, by his wife Jane, he was born at Porthaethwy in Anglesey on 17 September 1843. He had schooling there and at Bangor, and for some years worked as a mason, while continuing studies.

In 1864 Williams entered the Calvinistic Methodist College, Bala, where he acted (1867–9) as one of the tutors. He graduated B.A. London in 1870 (first in second class honours in classics); M.A. London in 1871 (second in philosophy honours). He then ran a grammar school at Menai Bridge, at the same time ministering to Calvinistic Methodists in Anglesey, and was ordained without charge (1873) in the presbyterian church of Wales. Appointed professor of Greek and mathematics at Bala in August 1873, he entered on his duties in the following year. In the vacation of 1874 he visited Germany for the study of the language. When the Bala College became purely theological (1891), he was appointed professor of church history.

In 1903 Williams was moderator of the North Wales assembly of the presbyterian church. On 19 April 1904 he received the degree of D.D. in Glasgow University. He was for some time troubled with a form of laryngitis. He preached every Sunday, though not reckoned a popular preacher, and conducted a weekly bible class. He was a member of the theological board and court of the University of Wales; also of the council of the Bangor College.

After suffering for nearly two years from arterial disease, Williams died at Bala on 11 May 1911, and was buried in the churchyard of Llanycil, Merionethshire.

== Works ==
Williams made a reputation with his edition of Gildas, with English translation and notes, pt. i. 1899; pt. ii. 1901 (Cymrodorion Record series). Magazine articles and papers prepared the way for his major work, Christianity in Early Britain, which was issued by the Clarendon press in February 1912: Some Aspects of the Christian Church in Wales in the Fifth and Sixth Centuries (1895); The Four Disciples of Illtud (1897); the article on the Welsh church in the new edition (1889–96) of the Encyclopædia Cambrensis (Gwyddoniadur Cymreig); a review of Heinrich Zimmer's Keltische Kirche (1901) and Pelagius in Irland (1901) in the Zeitschrift für Celtische Philologie (1903); and the article "Church (British)" in the Encyclopædia of Religion and Ethics (1910). He had outlined his findings in his Davies lecture, delivered at Birkenhead on 8 June 1905.

Williams published in Welsh, including:

- Yr Epistol at y Colossiaid, Bala, 1886.
- Yr Epistol at y Galatiaid: cyfiethiad newydd [together with that of 1620] … a nodiadau. Gyda map, Bala, 1892 (this and the preceding were new and annotated versions for Sunday school use).
- Y Sacramentau: anerchiad agoriadol, Bala, 1894.
- De Imitatione Christi … Rhagdraeth, Bala, 1907 (the introduction only was by Williams).

He also edited Lewis Edwards's Holiadau Athrawiaethol, Bala, 1897.

== Family ==
On 31 December 1884 Williams married Mary, eldest daughter of Urias Bromley, Old Hall, Chester, who survives him without issue.

== Notes ==
Attribution

This article incorporates text from a publication now in the public domain: Lee, Sidney, ed. (1912). "Williams, Hugh". Dictionary of National Biography (2nd supplement). Vol. 3. London: Smith, Elder & Co.
