= Church Island (Anglesey) =

Island in Anglesey, Wales

Coordinates: 53°13′22″N 4°10′17″W

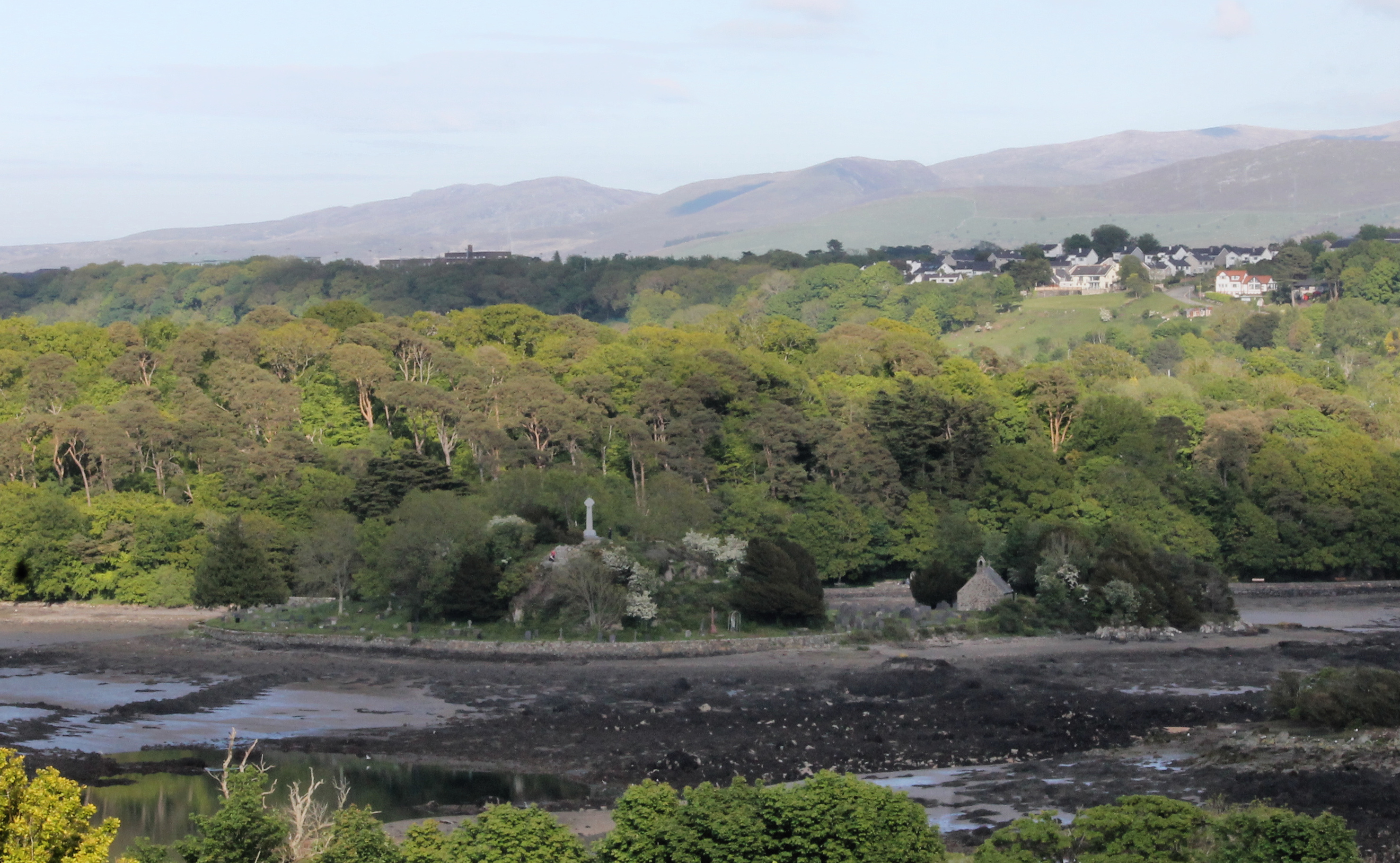
Church Island from Anglesey

Church Island, also known as Llandysilio Island, (Welsh: Ynys Tysilio) is a small island in the Menai Strait on the shores of Anglesey to which it is attached by a short causeway that is reachable only on foot. The dominant feature of the island is with St Tysilio's Church, constructed in the 15th century, its churchyard, and a grade-II listed war memorial. The 20th-century bard Cynan (Albert Evans-Jones) is among several notable people buried in the churchyard. The Anglesey Coastal Path passes the head of the causeway.

A number of birds inhabit the island and its waters, and it also features numerous primroses.

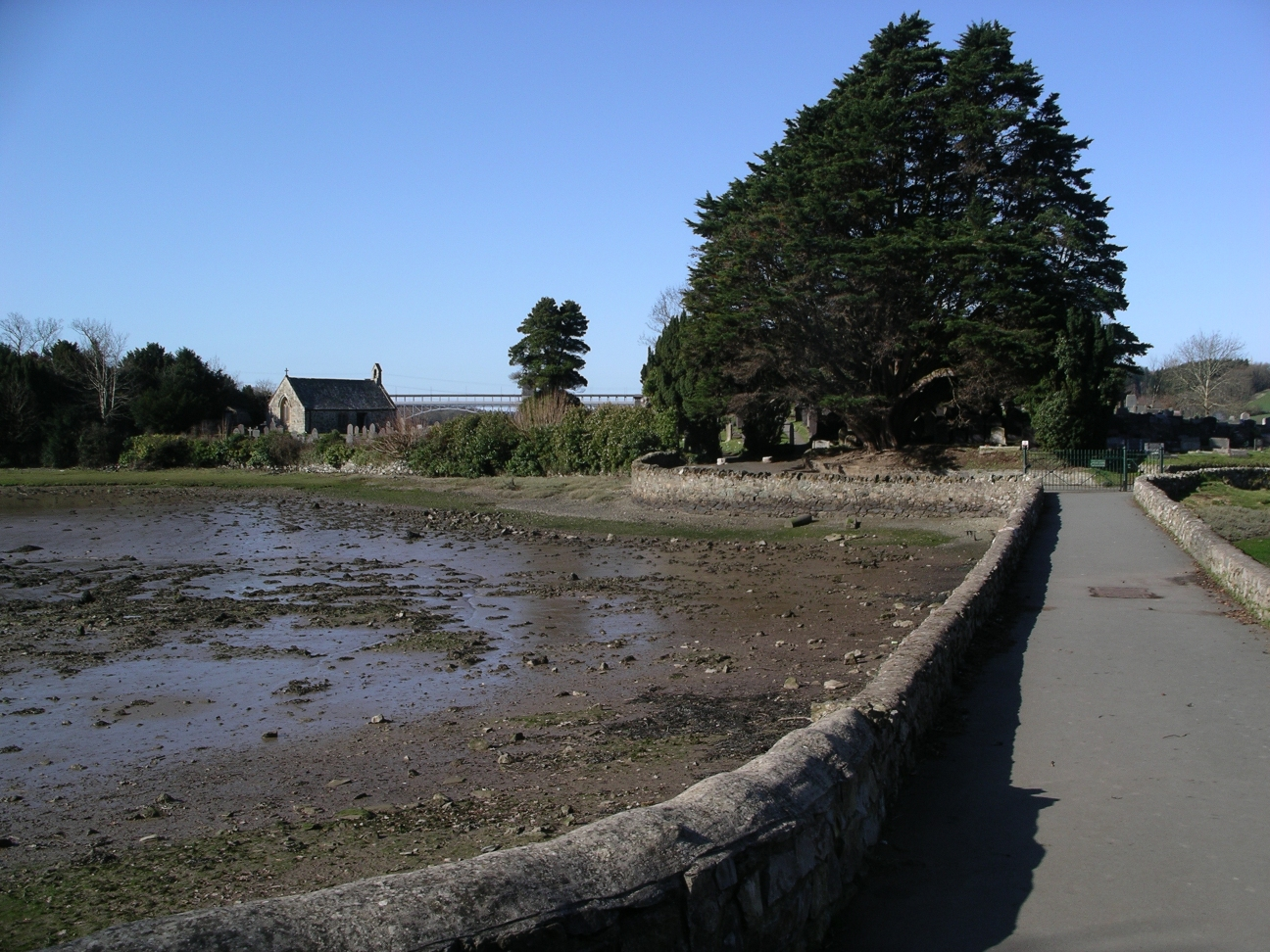
Church Island and Causeway

== Description ==
Church Island is located in the Menai Strait, off the south-eastern shore of the island of Anglesey, close to the town of Menai Bridge. It is located in a stretch of the Menai known as the Swellies, which is prone to dangerous tidal currents. Access to the island is via a short tidal causeway, which meets the Wales Coast Path long-distance footpath at its Anglesey end. The closest road is the A545, with a car park from which the island can be accessed via a woodland path.

St Tysilio's, a single-chamber church, is the major feature on the island, along with its graveyard and a war memorial near the highest point, which was designed by Harold Hughes and was given a grade-II listing in 1997.

== History ==
The early history of the island, including details of the construction of the causeway to the Anglesey mainland, is unknown. The first recorded occupation was by Prince Tysilio, later Saint Tysilio, who was the son of Brochwel Ysgithrog, a king of Powys. Tysilio arrived on Church Island in approximately AD 630, and founded a hermitage there. He remained there for around seven years, before moving to Meifod where he became an abbot. No trace of Tysilio's hermitage survives on Church Island today.

The present-day church of Saint Tysilio was founded in the fifteenth century. It is not known who built the church, but it is likely that it replaced an earlier structure on the same site. Several prominent people are buried in the churchyard, including Henry Rees Davies, other members of his family such as father Richard Davies, John Edward Lloyd, and the bard Albert Evans-Jones, known by the pseudonym of Cynan.

== Flora and fauna ==
Birds found close to the island include oystercatchers, curlews, common terns, and in recent times, little egrets. There are also a number of primroses growing, which give the island a golden appearance during the spring months.

== See also ==
- Ynys Gored Goch
