= Plas Cadnant =

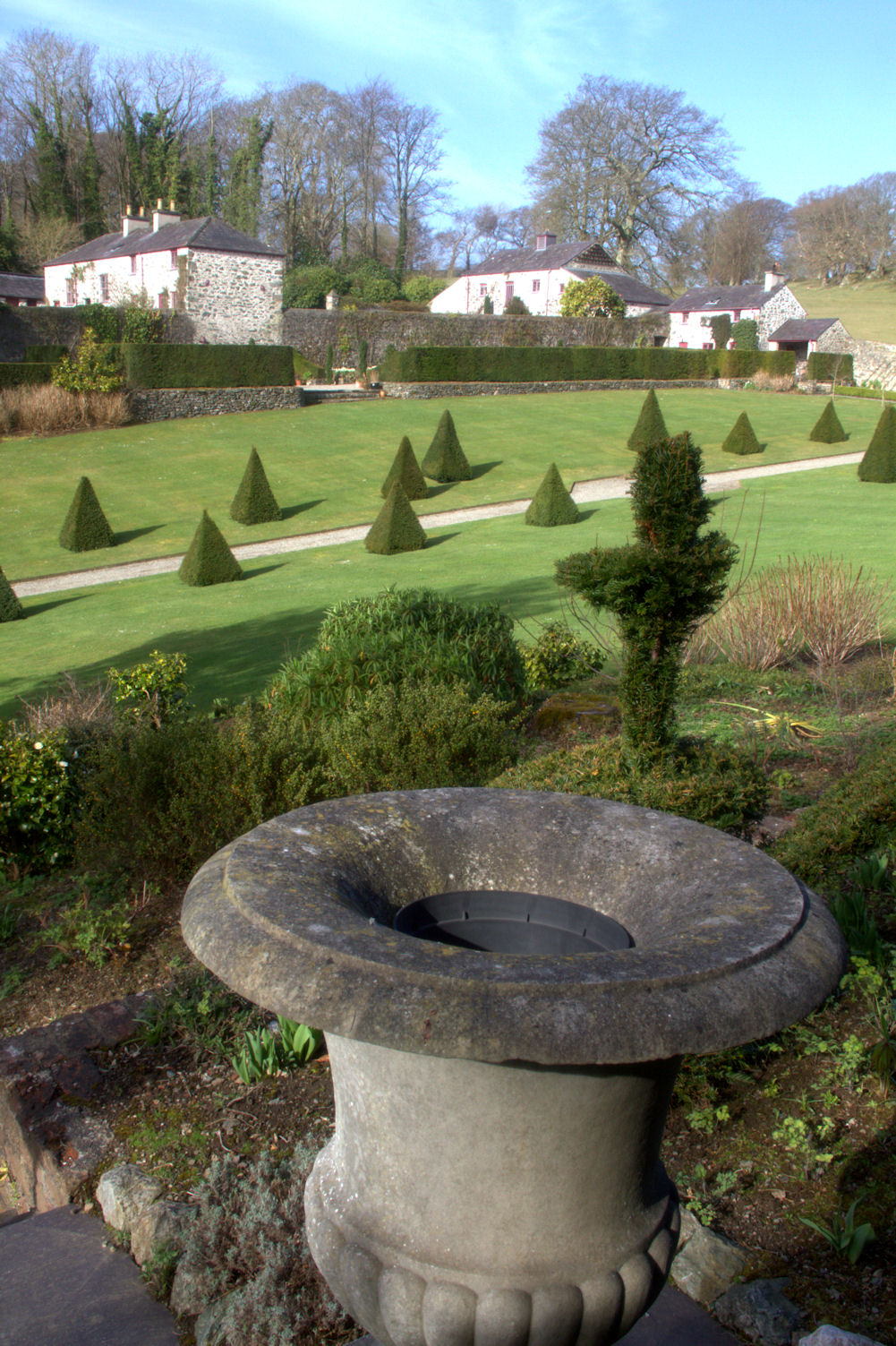

- Location within Wales

General information
- Status: Completed
- Location: Isle of Anglesey, Menai Bridge, Wales
- Coordinates: 53.2358°N 4.1629°W
- Construction started: 1803
- Renovated: 1996
- Owner: Anthony Tavernor

Technical details
- Grounds: 10 acres

Design and construction
- Awards: Menai Bridge Civic Society 2013

Other information
- Parking: yes

Website
- http://www.plascadnant.co.uk/

Plas Cadnant is an historic country estate in the town of Menai Bridge on the Isle of Anglesey. The buildings were Grade II listed by Cadw in 1967. The Georgian house dates from 1803 when it was built by John Price as his family home. The listed buildings also include Cadnant Lodge, at the entrance to the estate; a range of domestic outbuildings (which are thought to pre-date the Georgian house) and an icehouse.

== History ==
The land at Plas Cadnant began as a farm in the 16th century, and by the Victorian era had become a country estate. The estate deteriorated during the second half of the twentieth century until it was purchased in 1990 by Anthony Tavernor who began renovations on the buildings and grounds. While his intentions were to open the estate as a business, he describes the renovation work as "a labour of love". Tavernor aimed to restore the gardens in the picturesque ideal, aiming for an early 1800s style.

By 2006 Tavernor had opened a hotel service on the grounds via a number of self-catering cottages. Previously only open by appointment, the gardens were opened to the public in 2011, and a tea room and visitor centre were built.

== Gardens ==
The estate's gardens were developed in the 1800s by the family who owned the land but had been left to grow wild since the 1940s. In the 1990s renovations began to uncover and restore the overgrown areas, and in 2010 Anthony Tavernor was honoured by the Campaign for the Protection of Rural Wales for his work.

The garden consists of three sections: a walled garden containing a water pool and a variety of fruit trees, a "secret valley" garden in which waterfalls and a river can be found, and an upper woodland garden.

In December 2015, during heavy flooding, water damaged large parts of the garden including the destruction of an original 200-year-old wall and a number of rare plants. Repairs began on the affected areas of the garden in January 2016.
