= St Tysilio's Church, Menai Bridge =

Church in Anglesey, Wales

Coordinates: 53.2224°N 4.1713°W

St Tysilio's Church
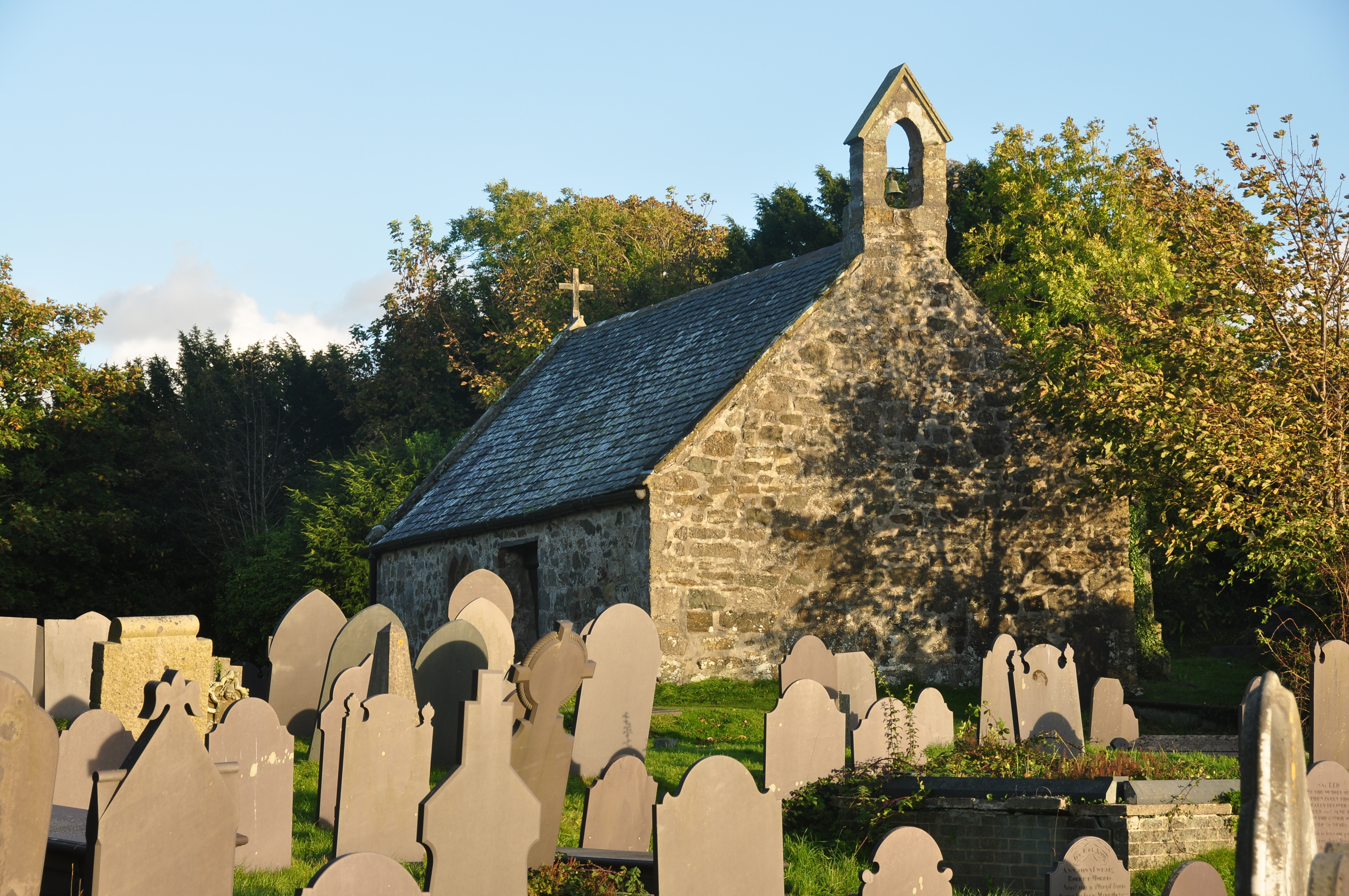
- St Tysilio's Church
- Country: Wales
- Denomination: Church in Wales

Architecture
- Heritage designation: Grade II*
- Designated: 14 February 1967
- Architectural type: Church
- Style: Medieval

St Tysilio's Church is a medieval church in the village of Menai Bridge, Anglesey, Wales. The current building dates from the early 15th century and underwent renovations in the 19th century. It was designated as a Grade II* listed building on 14 February 1967.

== History and location ==
Located on Church Island near Menai Bridge, St Tysilio's Church is dedicated to Saint Tysilio, who was renowned for establishing a sanctuary on Ynys Suliau (also known as Ynys Tysilio). The current structure most likely dates to the early 15th century, with some renovations made in the 19th century. It was designated as a Grade II* listed building on 14 February 1967. There are some World War One graves located in the church yard.

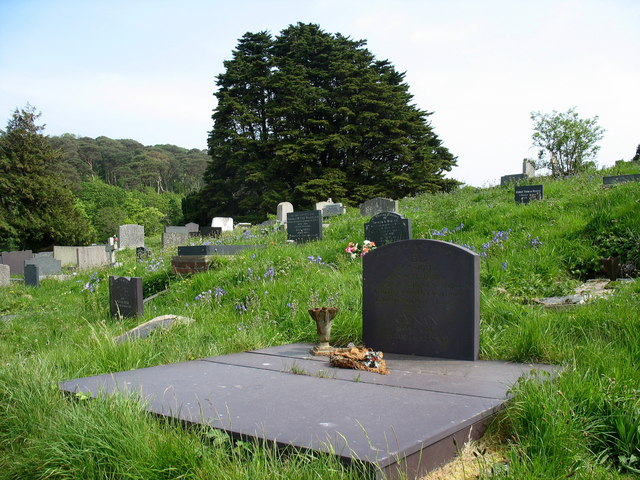
Bedd Cynan. Cynan's Grave in St Tysilio's Churchyard

Welsh war poet and dramatist Sir Albert Evans-Jones (Bardic name Cynan) (1895–1970) is buried in the churchyard.
