= Menai Bridge =

Town and community in Anglesey, Wales

Menai Bridge: Welsh: Porthaethwy
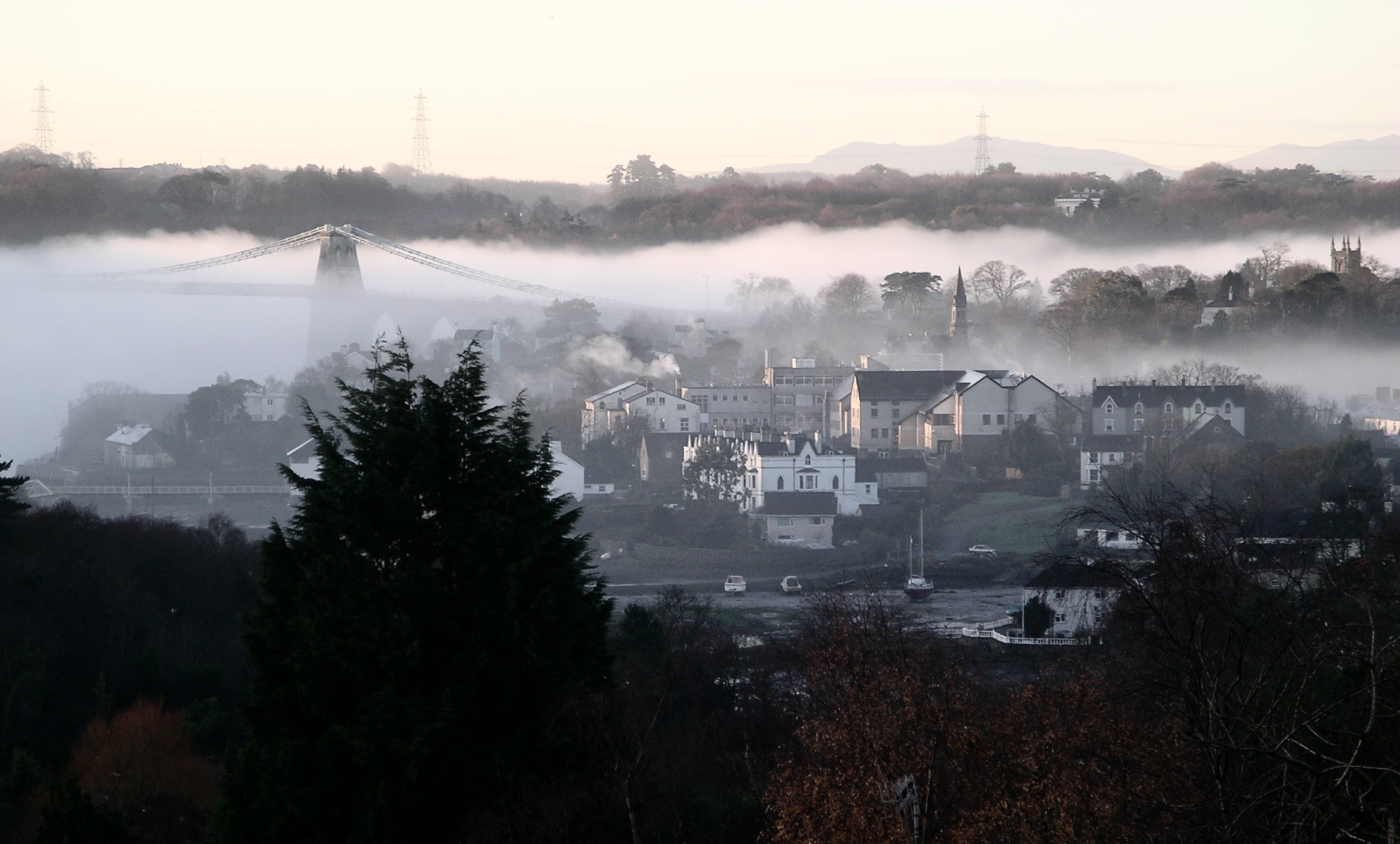
- Menai Bridge in mist

- Location within Anglesey
- Population: 3,376
- OS grid reference: SH555725
- Community: Menai Bridge
- Principal area: Isle of Anglesey
- Preserved county: Gwynedd
- Country: Wales
- Sovereign state: United Kingdom
- Post town: MENAI BRIDGE
- Postcode district: LL59
- Dialling code: 01248
- Police: North Wales
- Fire: North Wales
- Ambulance: Welsh
- UK Parliament: Ynys Môn
- Senedd Cymru – Welsh Parliament: Bangor Conwy Môn
- Website: menaibridge.org
- List of places UK Wales Anglesey 53.23°N 4.16°W Map of the community

Menai Bridge (Welsh: Porthaethwy; usually referred to colloquially as Y Borth) is a town and community on the Isle of Anglesey in north-west Wales. It overlooks the Menai Strait and lies by the Menai Suspension Bridge, built in 1826 by Thomas Telford, just over the water from Bangor. Menai Bridge has a population of 3,376.

There are many small islands near the town, including Church Island. The Menai Heritage Bridges Exhibition celebrates the Menai Suspension Bridge, built by Thomas Telford, and the Britannia Bridge, built by Robert Stephenson.

== Description and attractions ==
At the eastern edge of the town is Cwm Cadnant Dingle which is now by-passed by a modern bridge constructed in the 1970s. The Afon Cadnant drains into the Menai Strait at this point and this small estuary provides a natural haven for small boats crossing from the mainland. This was the location of the landing stage for the Bishops of Bangor who had their residence at Glyn Garth on Anglesey but whose cathedral was in Bangor on the mainland.

There are a number of small islands in the Menai Strait some of which are connected to the town by causeways, including Ynys Faelog, Ynys Gaint, Ynys Castell and Ynys y Bîg east of the suspension bridge and Church Island (Ynys Tysilio in Welsh) west of the bridge. The Isle of Anglesey Coastal Path passes along the waterfront.

Menai Bridge has several churches and chapels, including an English and Welsh Presbyterian church and a Catholic church. The town also has a primary school, Ysgol y Borth, and a large bilingual comprehensive school, Ysgol David Hughes.

Menai Bridge is home to the School of Ocean Sciences, part of Bangor University. Their research ship, the Prince Madog, is based at the pier when not at sea.

Attractions in Menai Bridge include the 14th-century Church of St Tysilio, St George's Pier, a butterfly house, Pili Palas, and the Plas Cadnant Hidden Gardens, a 200-acre (80 hectare) estate originally developed as a picturesque garden in the 1800s. The garden had been the site of restoration for twenty years. In December 2015, heavy rains caused flooding which washed away rare plants representing twenty years of work by Anthony Tavernor. Tavernor received some help to restore the garden, enabling him and his small staff to begin rebuilding and replanting the garden. The garden was able to reopen by Easter, 2016.

== Listed buildings ==
There are over 30 buildings listed by Cadw of being of special importance. These include the suspension bridge itself, St. Mary's Church, the church of St. Tysilio, the Victoria Hotel, and the War memorial on Church Island and several individual houses and buildings

== Glyn Garth ==
Menai Bridge includes the development along Beaumaris Road known as Glyn Garth. This was a favoured location for holiday houses for the wealthy from the Manchester and Liverpool areas in the late 19th century, and many large houses of that period remain. This was also where the Bishop of Bangor had his palace. The palace was demolished in the early 1960s and replaced by a block of flats, Glyn Garth Court, completed in 1966.

== History ==
The town existed as Porthaethwy for centuries and still has a house which dates from the 17th century. The name derives from Porth (harbour) + Daethwy (the name of a local Celtic tribe and later of a local medieval commote). It is likely that a community existed here in Roman times as it is the shortest crossing of the Menai Strait.

In the 9th century, St Tysilio lived here as a hermit on Church Island.

A ferry across the Menai was first recorded in 1292. When the bridge opened in 1826, the ferry closed, but connections with the sea remained through the import, export and shipbuilding trades.

Lewis Carroll's Through the Looking Glass (1872) mentions the Menai Bridge in chapter 8 in a nonsense song.

From 1877 to 1920, the ship HMS Clio was docked at Menai Bridge; it was lent to the North Wales Society to teach young men the ways of seafaring. Many local people believed the ship was used for some type of prison, but this was not entirely true. The ship was home to young men who were in need of discipline to keep them from getting into serious trouble; some were sent to the Clio against their will. The young men on the Clio were not permitted to leave the ship; some of the corporal punishment administered was cruel. Stories about life on the Clio were commonplace among the residents of Menai Bridge; for many years, some mothers threatened their misbehaving children with being sent to live on the ship.

On 12 November 1918, Major Thomas Elmhirst (later Air Marshal Sir Thomas Elmhirst), commanding officer of RNAS Anglesey, flew airship SSZ73 under the Menai Bridge following the armistice at the end of World War I.

=== Carreg yr Halen ===
Carreg yr Halen is a small tidal island in the Menai Strait. Its centre lies approximately 20 metres offshore from the Belgian Promenade just upstream of the suspension bridge. Only the rocky tip of the island is visible at high spring tide but at low tide area of rock, sand and some seaweed are exposed which provides feeding ground for a variety of wading birds including oystercatcher, redshank, and curlew.

It is the site of one of the many ferry crossings of the Menai Strait which were in use prior to the construction of the suspension bridge in 1826

In 1914, Belgian refugees from Mechelen, who had settled in the area, built a promenade (the Belgian promenade) out of gratitude for the town's hospitality. The promenade was built along the Menai Strait from Ynys Tysilio (Church Island) to Carreg yr Halen and was completed in 1916. It was rebuilt in 1963. The ceremonial reopening in 1965 was performed by the only surviving refugee, Eduard Wilhelms. Most of the refugees lived at three houses in Menai Bridge, with 12 housed at the Village Hall in Llandegfan. Most of the men were skilled in marquetry.

A special celebration was held in 2014 at Menai Bridge to celebrate to centenary of the construction of the promenade.

== TV location ==
Welsh-language production company, Rondo Media, has converted a disused garage into a fake row of shops in the centre of Menai Bridge as a film set for the soap opera Rownd a Rownd, shown on the Welsh-language channel S4C. They also film the show in schools in the town, Ysgol y Borth, and around the town itself.

== Fair ==
The large car park to the north of the High Street is the "fair field". This is a piece of common land set aside for the holding of an annual fair called Ffair Borth, a tradition dating back to 1691. It started as a horse fair, and livestock trading was carried out until the 1970s. It was also a hiring fair. It was one of the year's great occasions for the folk of Anglesey and Arfon. The fair now features traditional fair rides. It comes to Menai Bridge on 24 October every year, unless it falls on a Sunday, in which case it is held on either 23 or 25 October. The fair stalls also take over most of the roads and streets in the town, making passage through the town very difficult.

A traditional verse goes:

'Mae Ffair y Borth yn nesu,
Caf deisen wedi ei chrasu,
A chwrw poeth o flaen y tân,
A geneth lân i'w charu.'
(Hen Benillion, edited by T. H. Parry-Williams, no. 218)

Translation:

"The Porthaethwy fair is getting near,
The cake is out of the oven,
In front of the fire is warm beer,
And a fair maid for loving."

== Governance ==
There are two tiers of local government covering Menai Bridge, at community (town) and county level: Menai Bridge Town Council and Isle of Anglesey County Council. The town council is based at Canolfan Coed Cyrnol on Mona Road.

=== Administrative history ===
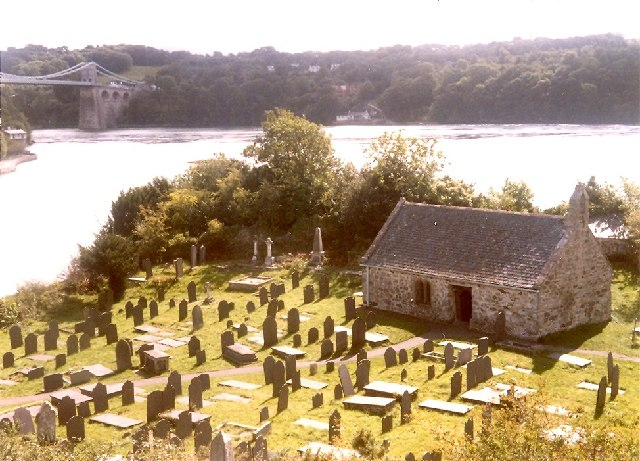
St Tysilio's Church on Church Island

The community of Menai Bridge corresponds to the ancient parish of Llandysilio, which had its parish church at St Tysilio's Church on Church Island.

In 1884 the parish was made a local government district, administered by an elected local board. Although its area was defined as the parish of Llandysilio, the local government district took the name Menai Bridge. The local board also took over the functions of the Llandysilio improvement commissioners, which had been established in 1879 to manage certain areas of former common land in the parish. Such local government districts were reconstituted as urban districts under the Local Government Act 1894.

Menai Bridge Urban District was abolished in 1974, with its area instead becoming a community called Menai Bridge. District-level functions passed to Ynys Môn-Isle of Anglesey Borough Council, which in 1996 was reconstituted as a county council.

== Notable people ==
- Hugh Williams (1843–1911), a Welsh church historian, college tutor and Presbyterian minister.
- Gwendolen Mason (1883-1977), Welsh harpist
- Jane Helen Rowlands (1891–1955), scholar and missionary
- Alun Owen (1925–94), screenwriter who wrote the script for The Beatles' A Hard Day's Night

== Gallery ==
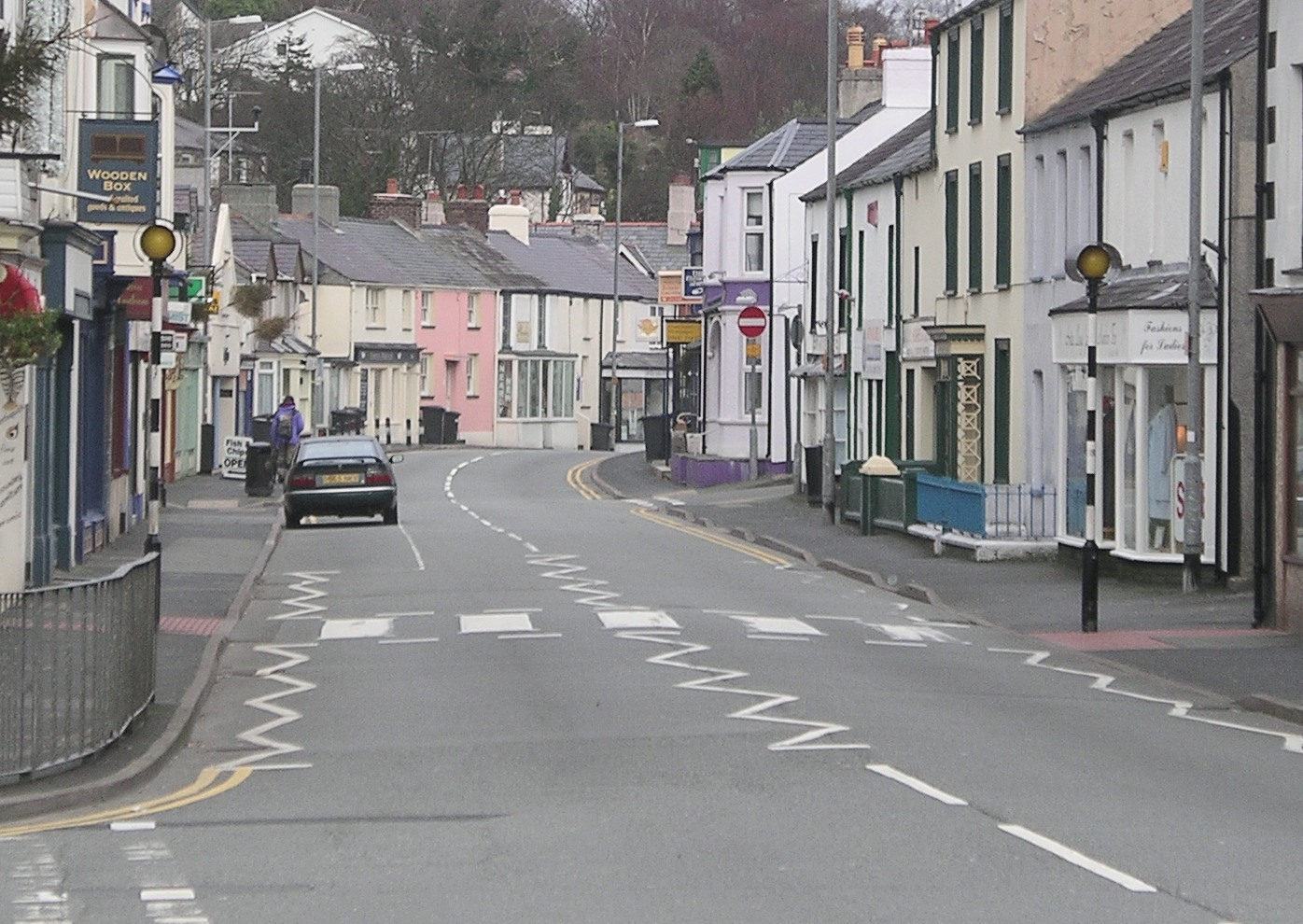
Menai Bridge High Street looking east

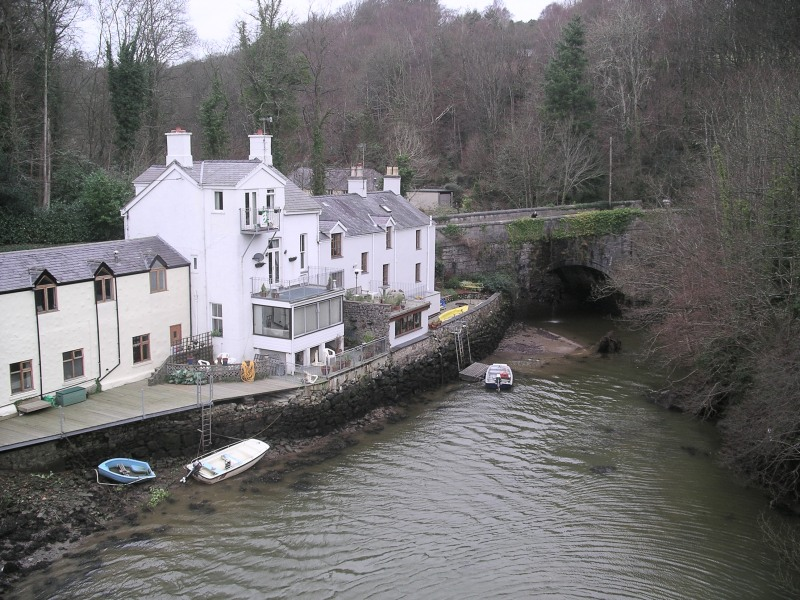
Cadnant Dingle January 2005

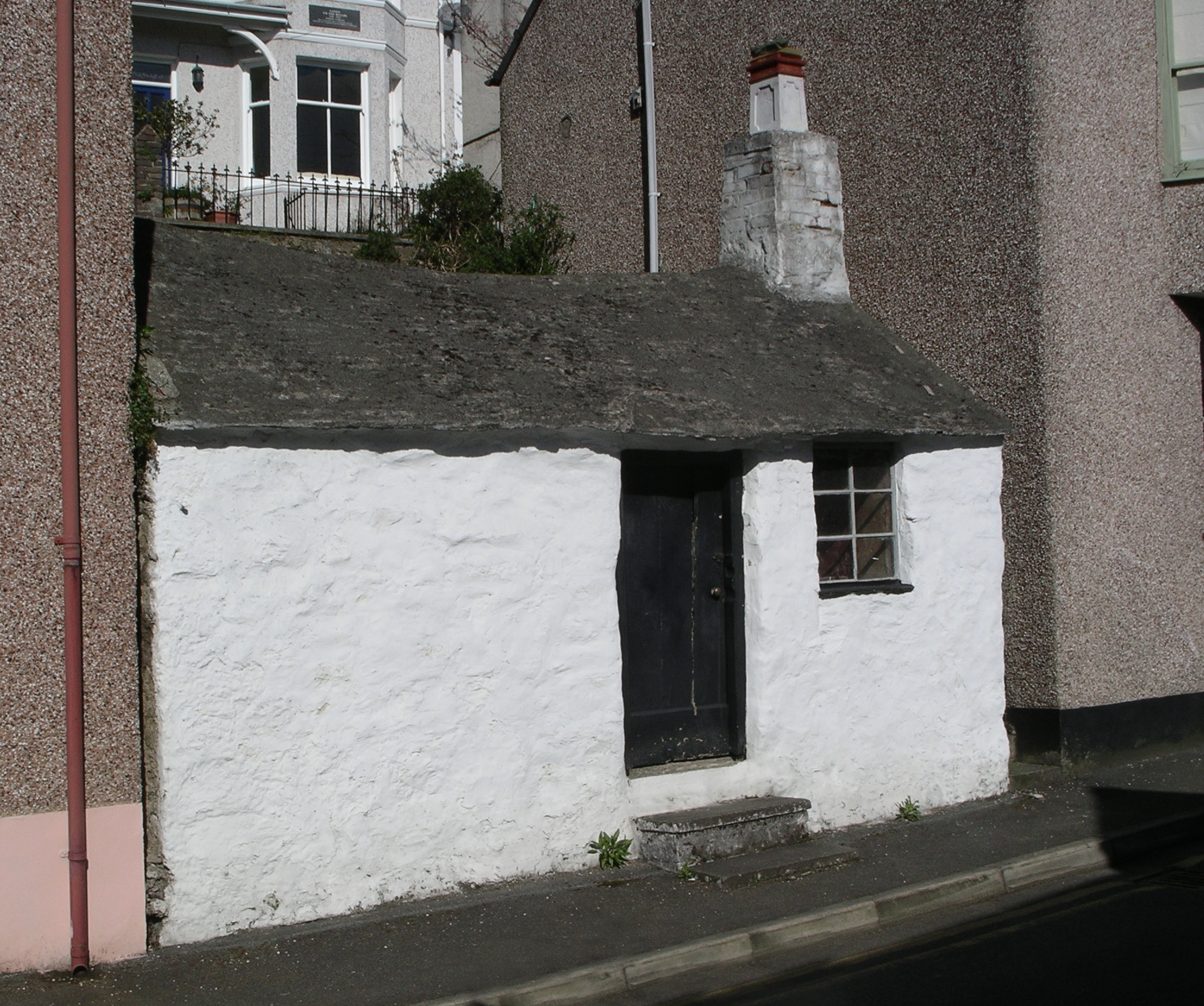
Smallest house in Menai Bridge

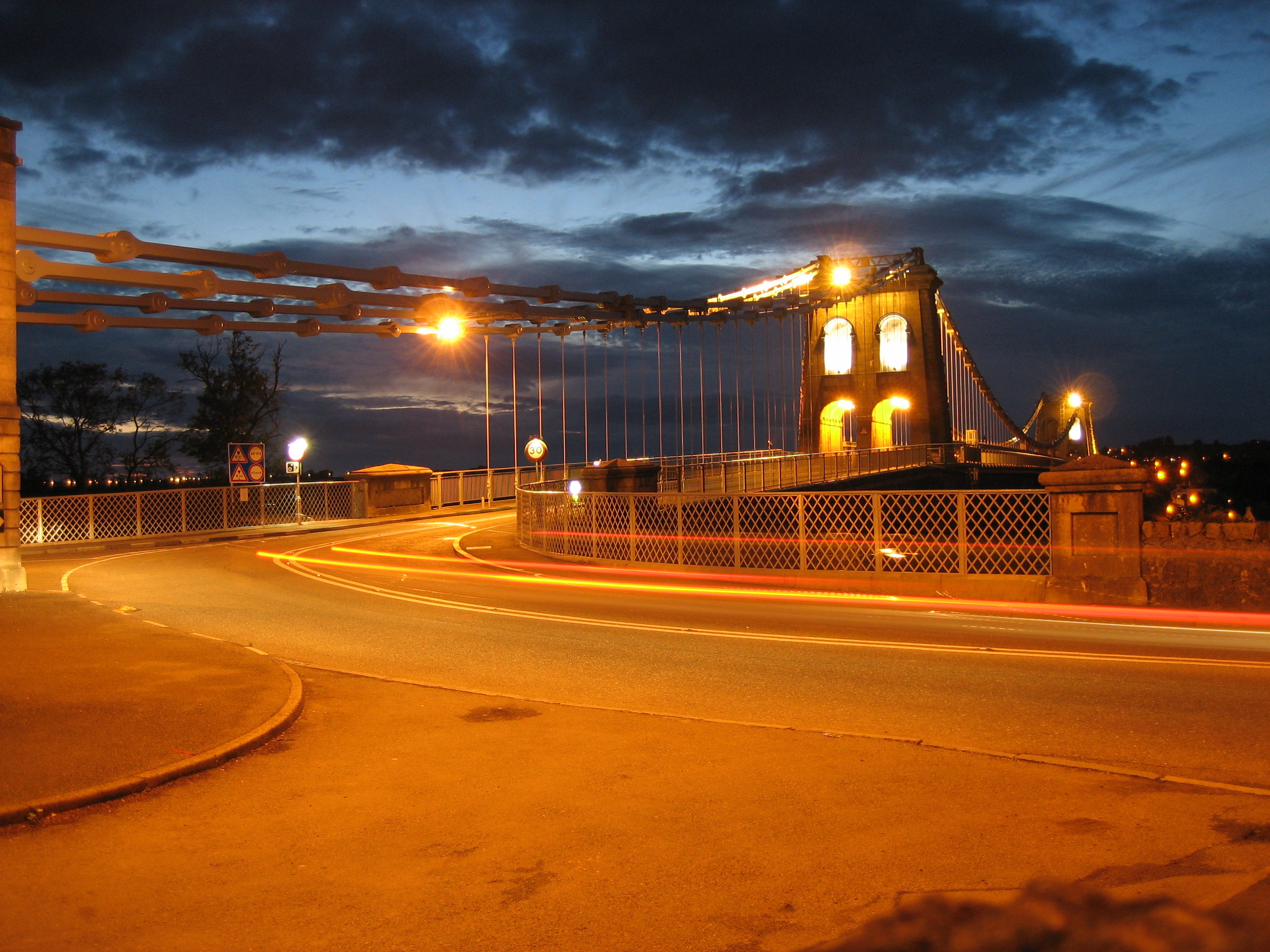
2.5 second exposure of the Menai Suspension Bridge in the evening

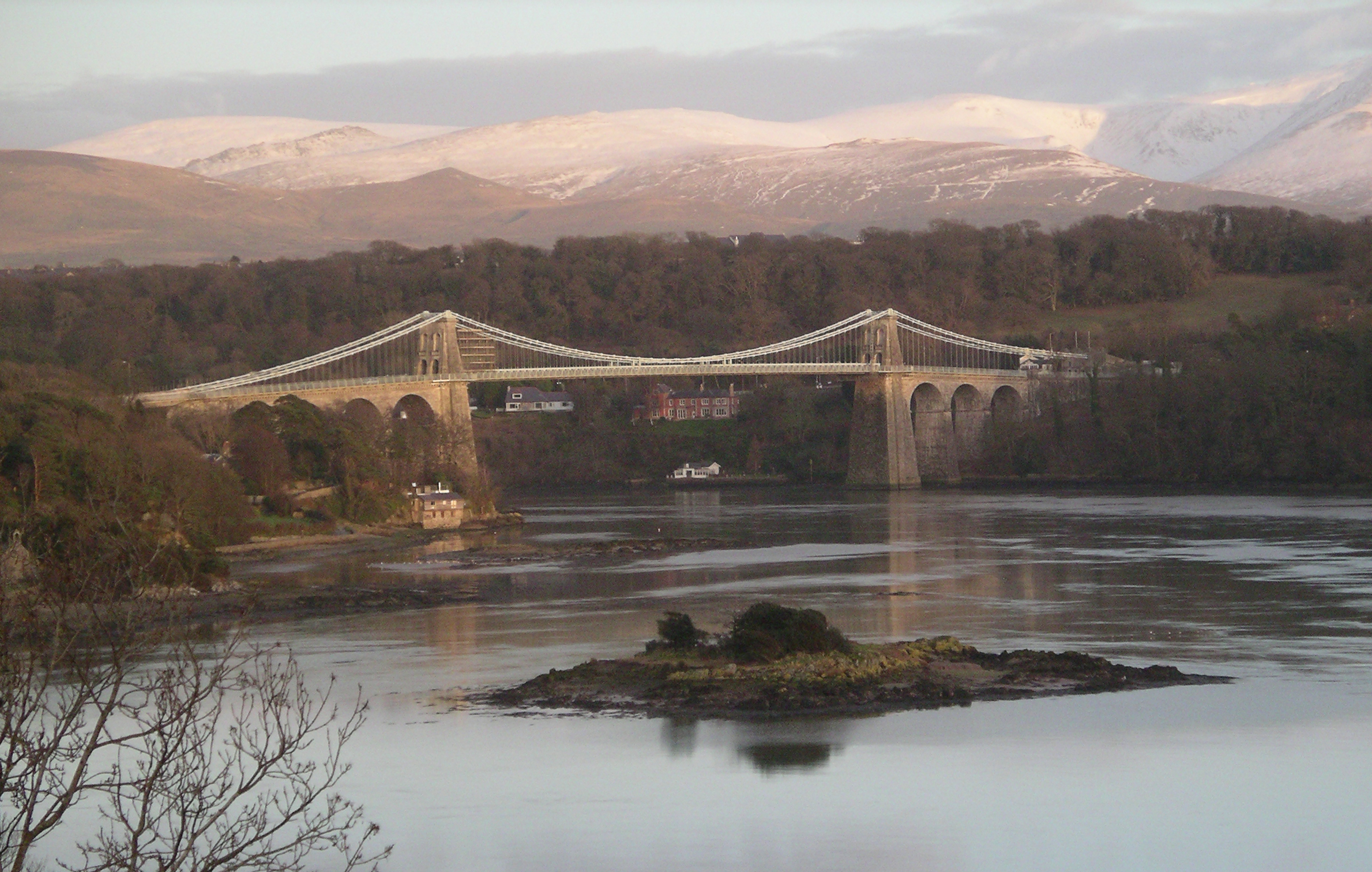
The Menai Suspension Bridge from a viewpoint on the A4080 near the Britannia Bridge

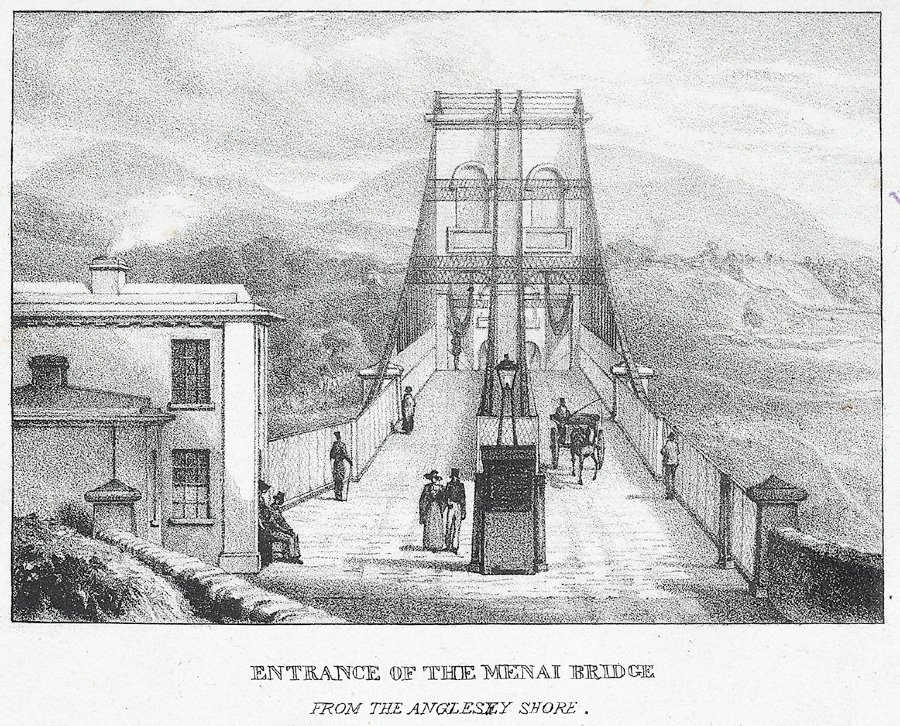
Entrance of the Menai Bridge: From the Anglesey Shore, ca 1840 by W Crane, fl. ca. 1835-1850

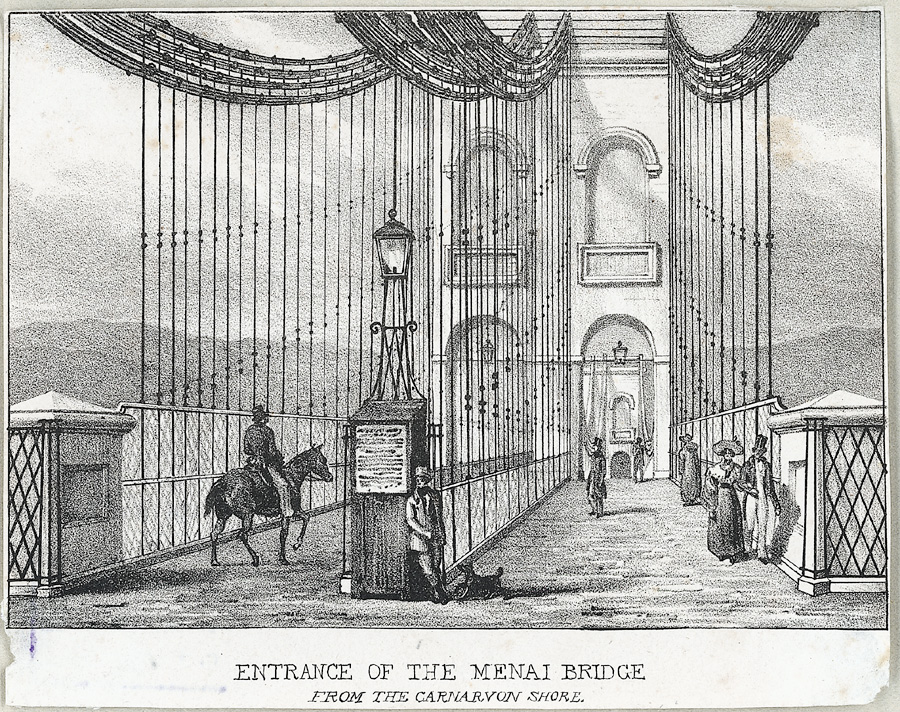
Entrance of the Menai Bridge: from the Carnarvon shore ca 1840

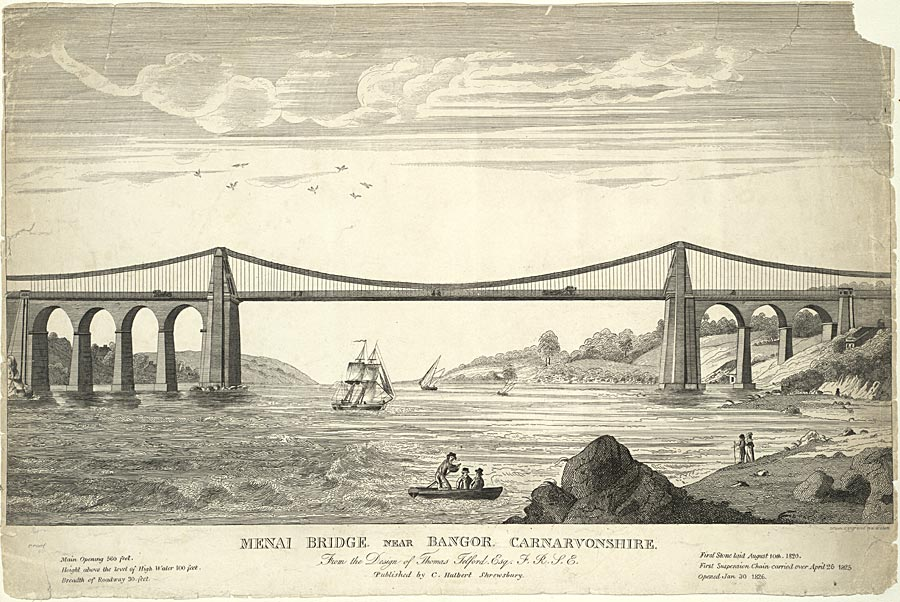
'Menai Bridge, near Bangor Carnarvonshire' by D Graham, engraver and D Graham, artist

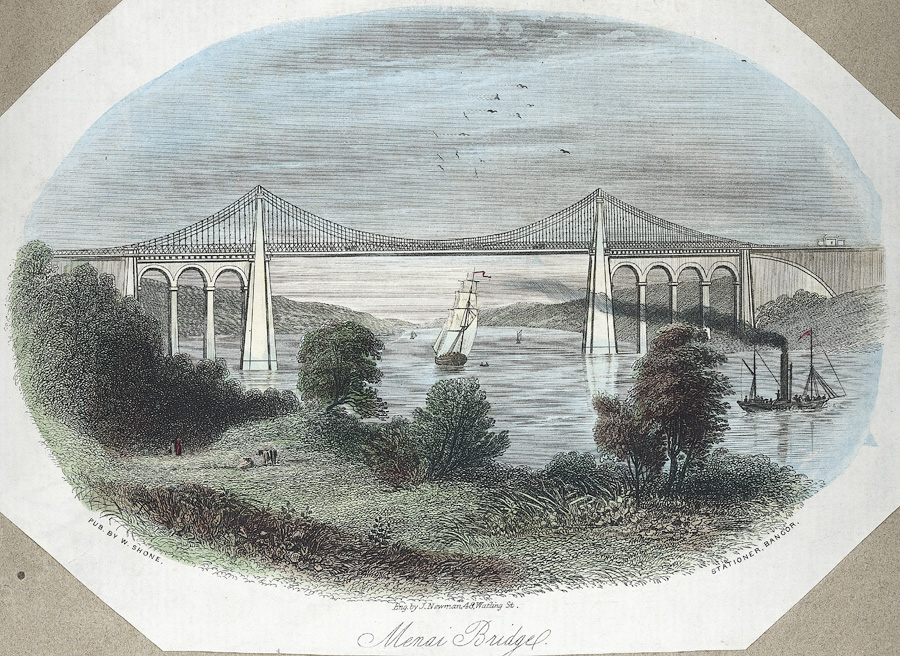
'Menai Bridge' ca 1830 by John Newman, fl. 1838-1880
