= Menai Strait =

Tidal water between Anglesey and mainland Wales

- Afon Menai (Welsh)
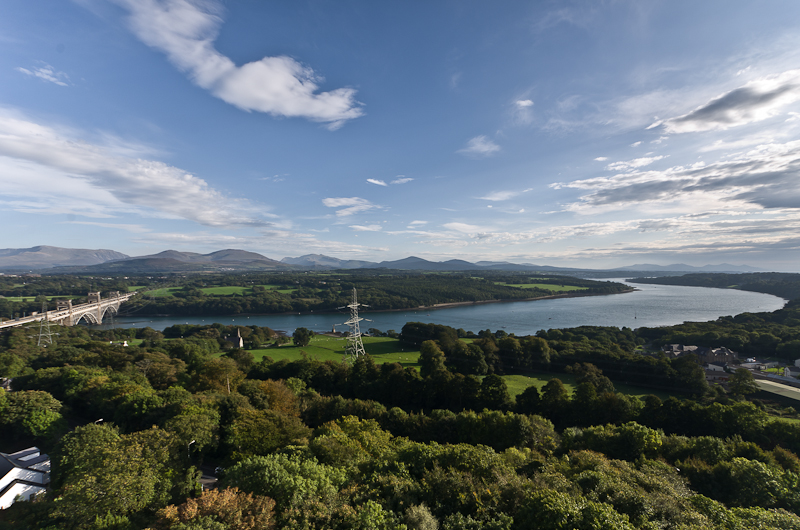
- The strait from Anglesey, looking towards Gwynedd, with the Britannia Bridge to the left.

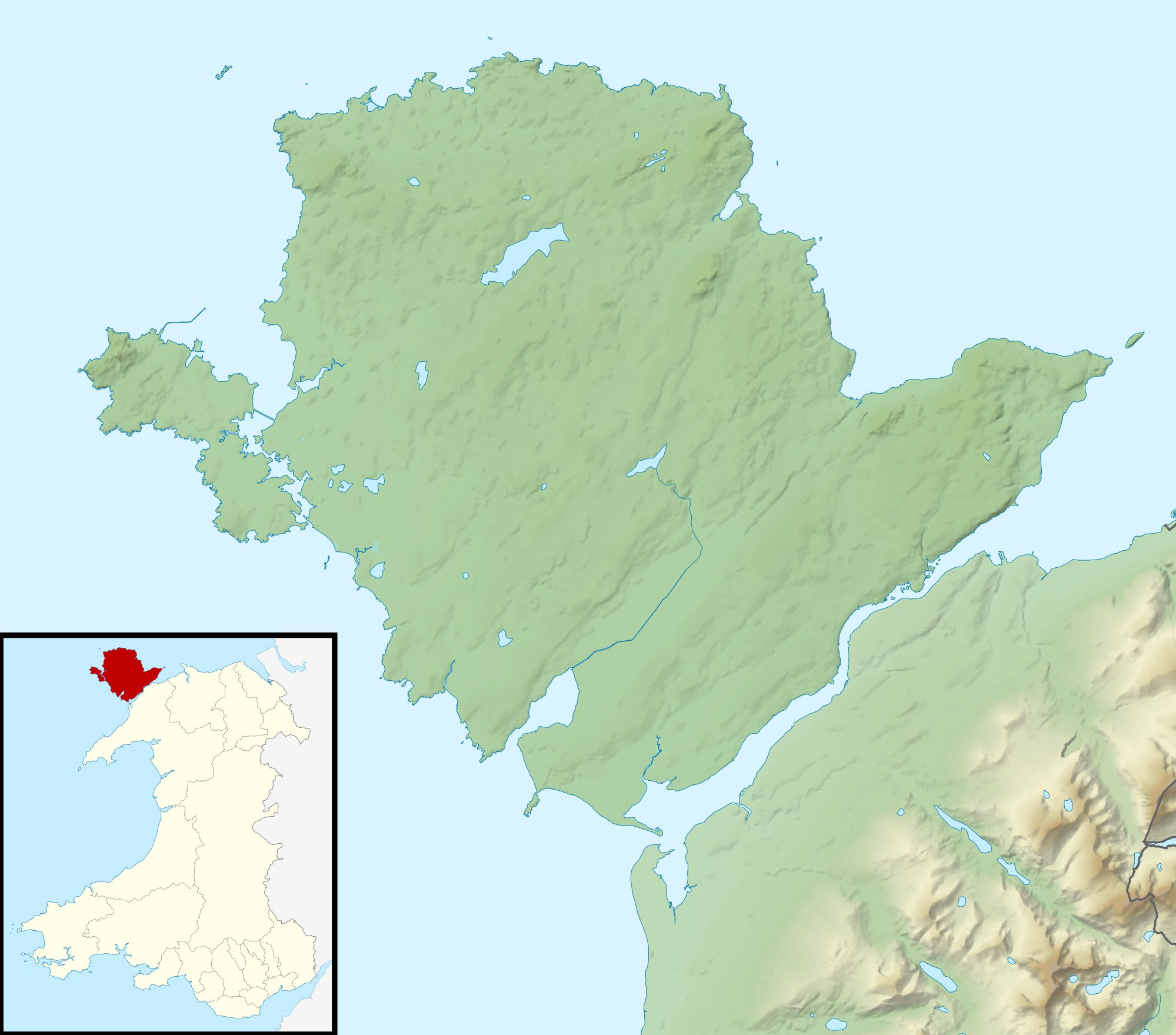
- Location within Anglesey
- Location: Irish Sea
- Coordinates: 53°10′50″N 4°14′00″W
- Type: Strait
- Settlements: Bangor, Beaumaris, Caernarfon, Y Felinheli, Menai Bridge

The Menai Strait (Welsh: Afon Menai, lit. 'River Menai') is a strait which separates the island of Anglesey from Gwynedd, on the mainland of Wales. It is situated between Caernarfon Bay in the south-west and Conwy Bay in the north-east, which are both inlets of the Irish Sea. The strait is about 16 mi (25 km) long and varies in width from 400 metres (1,300 ft) between Fort Belan and Abermenai Point to 4.7 miles (7.5 km) between Puffin Island (Ynys Seiriol) and Penmaenmawr. It contains several islands, including Church Island (Ynys Tysilio), on which is located St Tysilio's Church.

The strait is bridged by the Menai Suspension Bridge (Pont Grog y Borth), which was completed in 1826 to a design by Thomas Telford and carries the A5 road, and the Britannia Bridge (Pont Britannia) a truss arch bridge which carries the North Wales Main Line and the A55 road; it is an adaptation of a tubular railway bridge completed in 1850 to a design by Robert Stephenson, which was severely damaged by a fire in 1970.

The differential tides at the two ends of the strait cause very strong currents which create dangerous conditions. One of the most hazardous areas is the Swellies (Pwll Ceris), between the two bridges, where rocks near the surface cause over-falls and local whirlpools. This was the site of the loss of the training ship HMS Conway in 1953. Entering the strait at the Caernarfon end is also hazardous because of the frequently shifting sand banks that make up Caernarfon bar.

== Origins ==
The present day channel is a result of glacial erosion of the bedrock along a line of weakness associated with the Menai Strait fault system. During a series of Pleistocene glaciations a succession of ice-sheets moved from northeast to southwest across Anglesey and neighbouring Gwynedd scouring the underlying rock; the grain of which also runs in the same direction. The result was a series of linear bedrock hollows across the region, the deepest of which was flooded by the sea as world ocean levels rose at the end of the last ice age (c. 10,000 BC).

== History ==
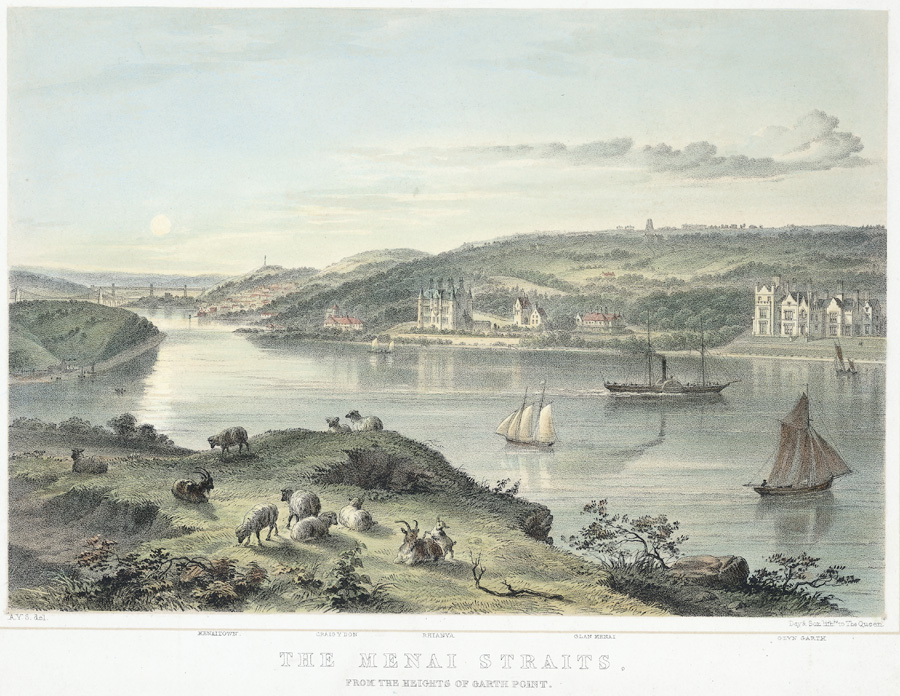
The Menai Strait, painted 1860

The name Menai comes from Welsh main-aw or main-wy, meaning "narrow water."

According to Heimskringla, the 11th century Norse-Gael ruler Echmarcach mac Ragnaill plundered in Wales with his friend, the Viking Guttorm Gunnhildsson. However they started quarreling over the plunder and fought a battle at the Menai Strait. Guttorm won the battle by praying to Saint Olaf and Echmarcach was killed.

In the 12th century, a later Viking raid and battle in the Menai Strait are recounted in the Orkneyinga Saga as playing an important role in the life of Magnus Erlendsson, Earl of Orkney – the future Saint Magnus. He had a reputation for piety and gentleness. Refusing to fight in the raid on Anglesey, he stayed on board his ship, singing psalms. This incident is recounted at length in the 1973 novel Magnus by Orcadian author George Mackay Brown, and in the 1977 opera, The Martyrdom of St Magnus by Peter Maxwell Davies. The first of the opera's nine parts is called "The Battle of Menai Strait".

From the 1890s until 1963, the pleasure steamers of the Liverpool and North Wales Steamship Company would ply their main route from Liverpool and Llandudno along the Menai Strait, and around Anglesey. After the company's voluntary liquidation in 1962, P and A Campbell took over the services for a while. Now, every year for two weeks in the summer, the MV Balmoral undertakes a similar service. The most recent service appears to have been Feb-2021, since when the vessel has been taken to dry dock for essential repair work

== Tidal effects ==
The tidal effects observed along the banks of the strait can be confusing. A rising tide approaches from the south-west, causing the water in the strait to flow north-eastwards as the level rises. The tide also flows around Anglesey until, after a few hours, it starts to flow into the strait in a south-westerly direction from Beaumaris. By this time, the tidal flow from the Caernarfon end is weakening and the tide continues to rise in height but the direction of tidal flow is reversed. A similar sequence is seen in reverse on a falling tide. This means that slack water between the bridges tends to occur approximately one hour before high tide or low tide.

Theoretically it is possible to ford the strait in the Swellies at low water, spring tides when the depth may fall to less than 0.5 metres (1.6 ft). However, at these times a strong current of around 4.8 knots (8.9 km/h) is running, making the passage extremely difficult. Elsewhere in the strait the minimum depth is never less than 2 metres (6.6 ft) until the great sand flats at Lavan Sands are reached beyond Bangor.

The tides carry large quantities of fish, and the construction of fish weirs on both banks and on several of the islands, helped make the Strait an important source of fish for many centuries. Eight of the numerous Menai Strait fish weirs are now scheduled monuments.

== Ecology ==
A crab wearing a sponge suit seen underwater below the Menai Suspension Bridge

=== Marine ===
Because the strait has unusual tidal conditions and very low wave heights owing to its sheltered position, it supports a unique and diverse benthic ecology.

The depth of the channel reaches 15 metres (49 ft) in places, and the current can exceed 7 knots (13 km/h). It is very rich in sponges.

The existence of this unique ecology was a major factor in the establishment of Bangor University's School of Ocean Sciences at Menai Bridge, as well as its status as a special area of conservation with marine components. The waters are also a proposed Marine Nature Reserve.

=== Land ===
The same unique ecology and geomorphology has let to a number of designations of SSSIs along the strait including Glannau Porthaethwy, the ivy–oak–ash woodland on the southern shore (Coedydd Afon Menai) and Lavan Sands (Welsh: Traeth Lafan). The banks of the Menai Strait are home to the critically endangered Menai Whitebeam. The plant is an extremely rare species of Sorbus only found in this part of North Wales. The population contains about 30 plants, and most of these are thought to be mature.

Much of the land on Anglesey at the eastern end of the strait is designated as an area of outstanding natural beauty.

== Crossings ==
=== Menai Bridge ===
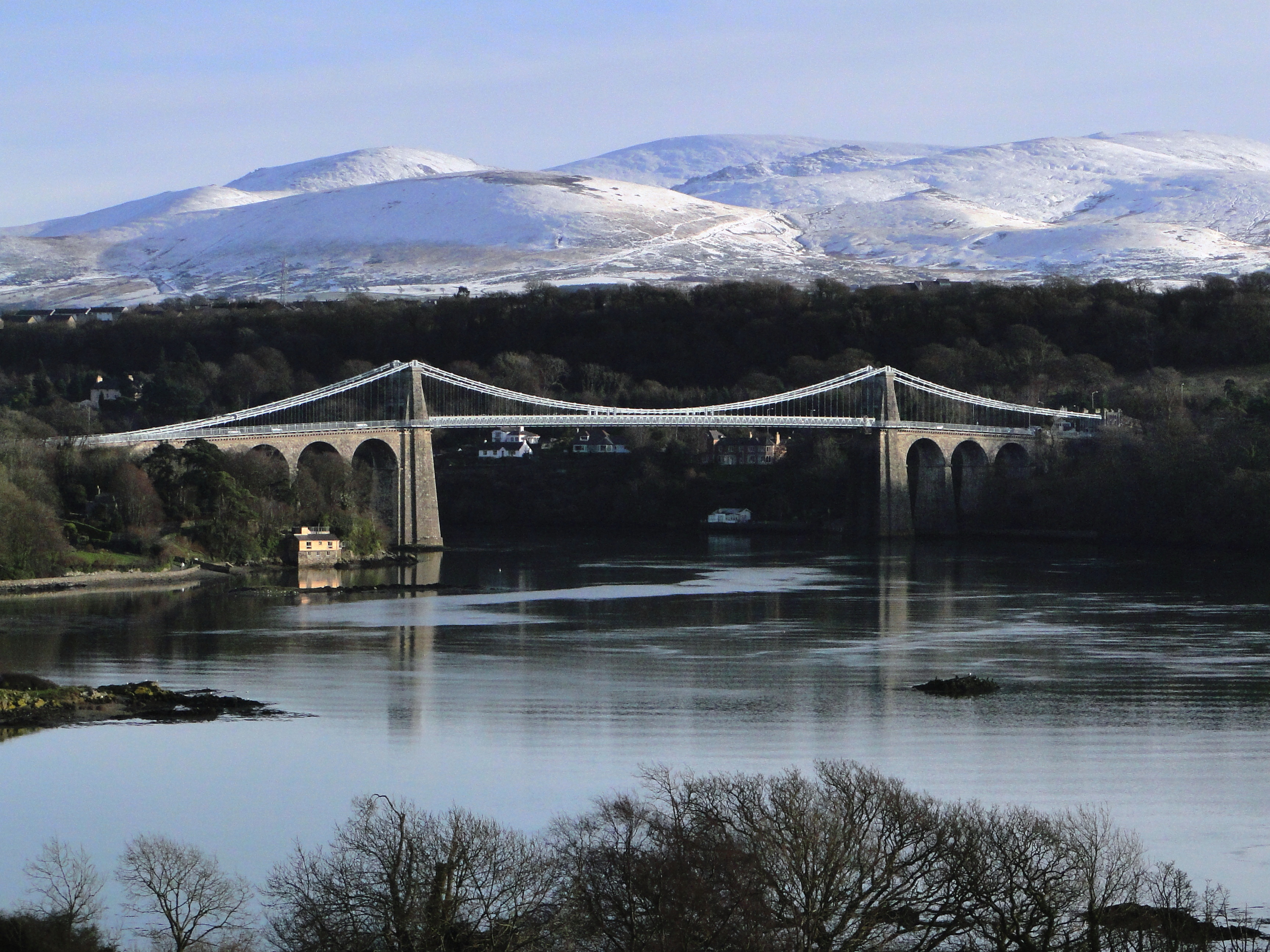
Thomas Telford's Menai Suspension Bridge.

Opened in 1826, the Menai Bridge is a 417-metre-long (1,368 ft), 30-metre-tall (98 ft) suspension bridge, and the first bridge to cross the Menai Strait. The bridge, designed by Thomas Telford, carries the A5, a road which connects the capital London to Holyhead on Holy Island. The bridge itself is grade one listed and a candidate to become a UNESCO World Heritage Site.

=== Britannia Bridge ===
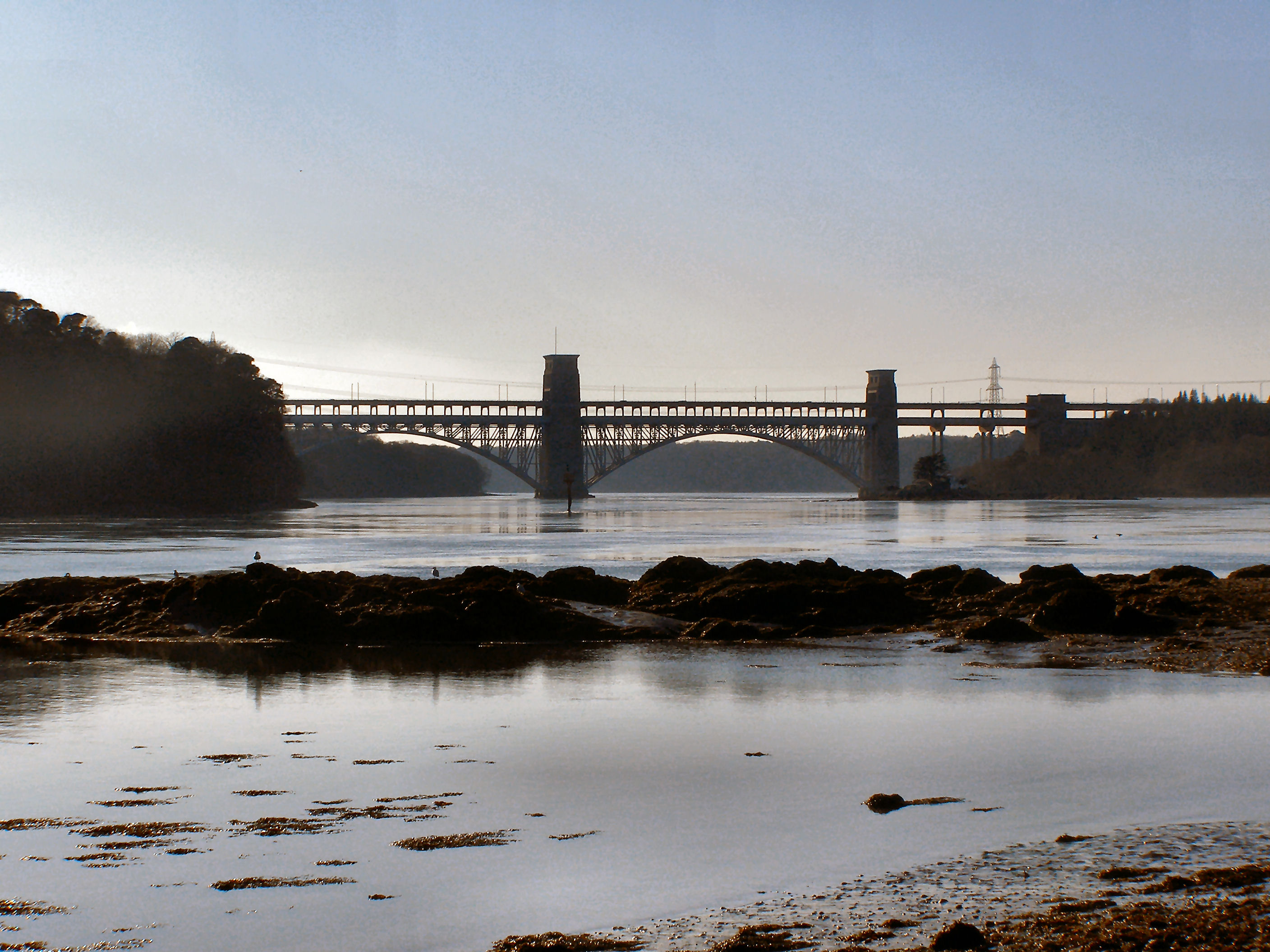
Robert Stephenson's Britannia Bridge.

Opened in 1850, the Britannia Bridge was built as a rail bridge connecting Anglesey to the mainland. The bridge, 461 metres long and 40 metres tall, carries the North Wales Coast Line connecting Holyhead to Crewe. Between 1970 and 1972, the bridge underwent a redesign in order to accommodate what would later become the A55, a dual carriageway connecting Chester to Holyhead. The bridge is grade two listed and is the more common crossing point out of the two bridges.

=== Proposed third crossing ===
Since 2007, a Third Menai Crossing had been proposed by government to tackle congestion on the other two crossings. However, on 14 February 2023, the Welsh Government announced that the project would not go ahead, citing efforts to reduce car usage, its environmental impact and it being a "blot" on the landscape. Issues with financing the project was later stated by the government as another reason why the project could not proceed. Lee Waters, deputy minister for climate change, later stated the crossing could be considered again as part of a wider review into the infrastructure of North Wales, rather than individually.

== See also ==
- Angharad ferch Owain – Queen of Gwynedd
- Halen Môn - sea salt produced from the waters of the Strait
