= St Cristiolus's Church, Llangristiolus =

Coordinates: 53.236743°N 4.323919°W

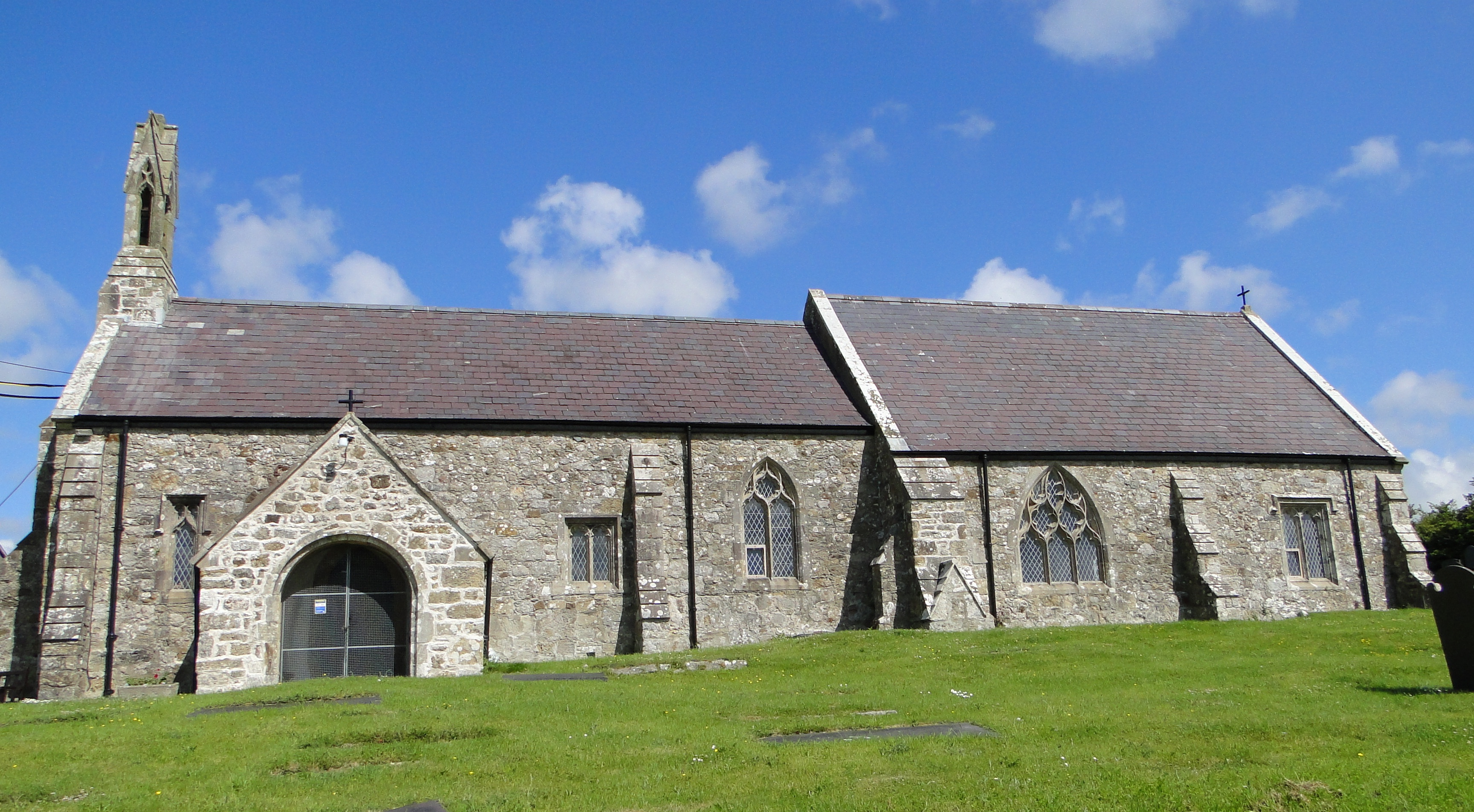
- The south side of St Cristiolus's Church, with the nave to the left and the chancel to the right

- Location in Anglesey
- Location: Llangristiolus, Anglesey
- Country: Wales
- Denomination: Church in Wales
- Website: St Cristiolus's Church

History
- Status: Church
- Founded: 610 (reputedly); Present building dates from 12th century
- Founder: St Cristiolus (reputedly)
- Dedication: St Cristiolus

Architecture
- Functional status: Active
- Heritage designation: Grade II*
- Designated: 30 January 1968
- Architect: Henry Kennedy (1852 restoration)
- Style: Mainly in Decorated style

Specifications
- Length: Nave 44 ft 9 in (13.6 m); chancel 32 ft 9 in (10.0 m)
- Width: Nave 15 ft 6 in (4.7 m); chancel 20 ft 6 in (6.2 m)
- Materials: Rubble masonry, dressed with freestone

Administration
- Province: Province of Wales
- Diocese: Diocese of Bangor
- Archdeaconry: Bangor
- Deanery: Malltraeth
- Parish: Plwyf Seintiau Braint a Chefni

Clergy
- Vicar: The Reverend E C Williams

St Cristiolus's Church, Llangristiolus is a medieval church near the village of Llangristiolus, in Anglesey, north Wales. The village, about 1 mile (1.6 km) from the building, takes its name from the church. Reputedly founded by St Cristiolus in 610, the present building dates from the 12th and 13th centuries. Alterations were made in the 16th century, when the large east window in Perpendicular style was added to the chancel – a window which has been described by one guide to the buildings of north Wales as "almost too big to fit" in the wall. Some restoration work took place in the mid-19th century, when further windows were added and the chancel largely rebuilt.

The church is still in use for weekly Sunday services (in Welsh and English), as part of the Church in Wales, and is one of four churches in a combined parish. It is a Grade II* listed building, a national designation given to "particularly important buildings of more than special interest", in particular because of its age and the east window. The church contains a decorated font from the 12th century, as well as memorials from the 18th, 19th and 20th centuries. Richard Owen, a 19th-century Calvinistic Methodist minister from Llangristiolus, is buried in the graveyard. The churchyard also contains the grave of the noted geologists, Edward and Annie Greenly, who pioneered modern geological mapping in Anglesey.

== History and location ==
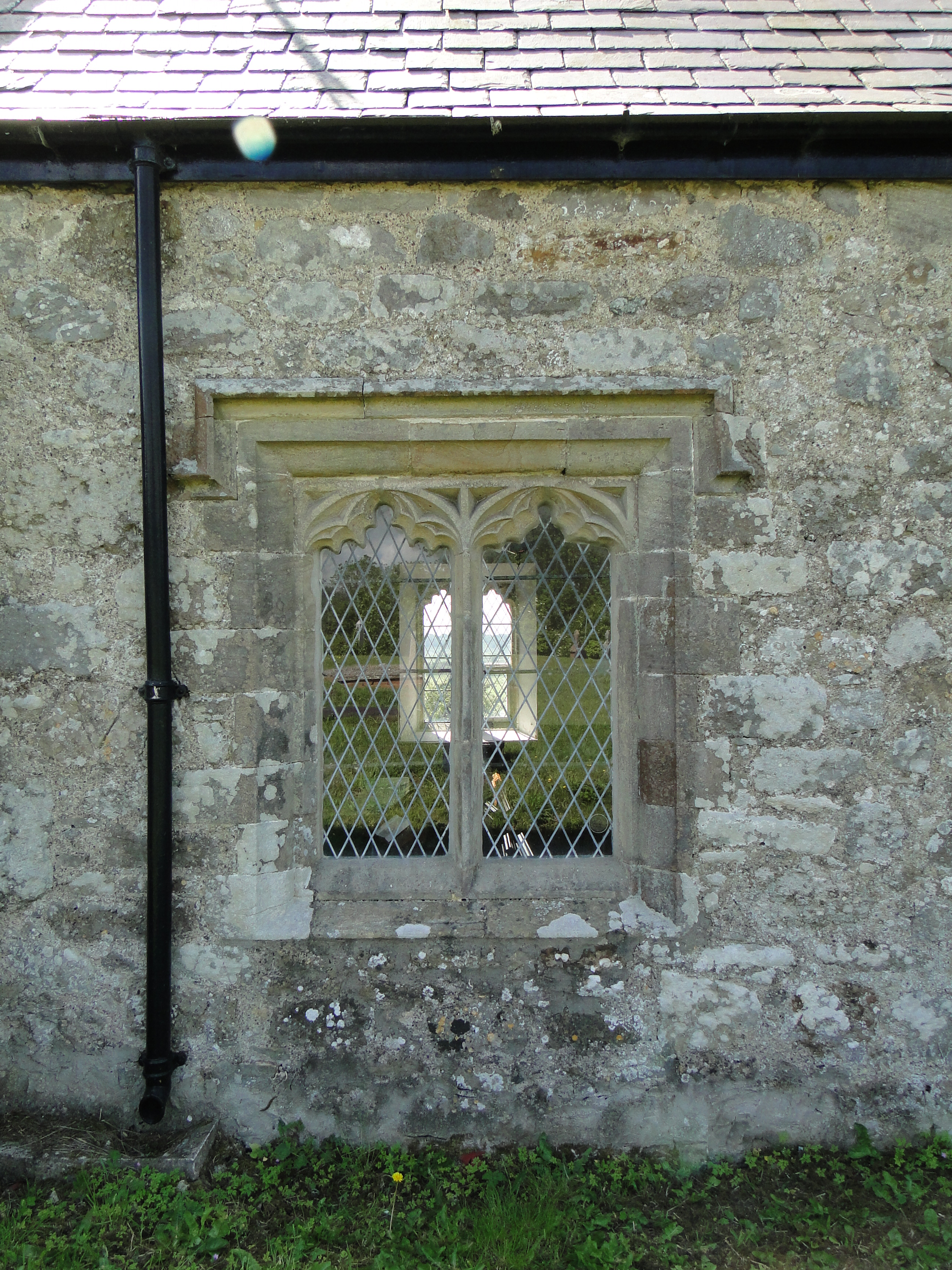
The 16th-century window in the north wall of the chancel; its 19th-century counterpart on the other side can also be seen

St Cristiolus's Church is in central Anglesey, north Wales. It is situated just to the south of the A5 and A55 roads, on raised ground above Malltraeth Marsh. The modern village of Llangristiolus is about 1 mile (1.6 km) to the west of the church. The village takes its name from the church: the Welsh word llan originally meant "enclosure" and then "church", and "-gristiolus" is a modified form of the saint's name.

The date of foundation of the first building on this site is unknown. Geraint Jones, in a 2006 guide to Anglesey churches, wrote that it is thought that St Cristiolus established a church here in 610. Cristiolus, a 7th-century saint about whom little detail is known, was a follower of St Cadfan, a Breton saint associated with the Christian community on Bardsey Island in Wales. Cristiolus is also credited with the foundation of the church in Eglwyswrw in modern-day Pembrokeshire, south Wales. He was the brother of St Rhystud, who established the church at Llanrhystud in mid-Wales.

The present building dates from the 12th century; it is the only medieval building in the parish. During the 13th century, the chancel was extended, and the older part of the church may have been rebuilt using the previous stones at this time. By 1535, the position of rector of the parish was held by the person holding the position of Archdeacon of Anglesey, as part of the remuneration for that office; this is no longer the case. Further structural changes to the church were made in the early 16th century when some windows were added to the chancel. In 1852, restoration work took place to the nave and chancel under Henry Kennedy, architect of the Diocese of Bangor. The chancel was rebuilt, although the east wall and window were retained, and further windows were added in the church.

St Cristiolus's Church is still in regular use and belongs to the Church in Wales. It is one of six churches in the combined benefice of Plwyf Seintiau Braint a Chefni. The other churches in the benefice are St Michael's, Gaerwen; St Ffinan's, Llanffinan; St Caffo's, Llangaffo; St Edwen's, Llanedwen; and St Mary's, Llanfairpwll. It is within the deanery of Malltraeth, the archdeaconry of Bangor and the Diocese of Bangor. The current incumbent (as of 2013), Emlyn Williams, was appointed as vicar of St Cristiolus's Church in 2007; before that, the position had been vacant for 20 years despite many attempts by the Church in Wales to fill it. He is assisted by one associate priest and two associate curates. Services are held every Sunday morning, alternating between a bilingual service of Holy Communion and a service of Morning Prayer; there are no midweek services.

People associated with the church include Henry Maurice (elected Lady Margaret Professor of Divinity at the University of Oxford shortly before his death in 1691; his father, Thomas, was the perpetual curate of the church) and the 19th-century writer and priest Owen Wynne Jones (who was the curate for a time in the early 1860s). The 19th-century Calvinistic Methodist preacher Richard Owen was born in the parish, and is buried in the graveyard that surrounds the church.

== Architecture and fittings ==
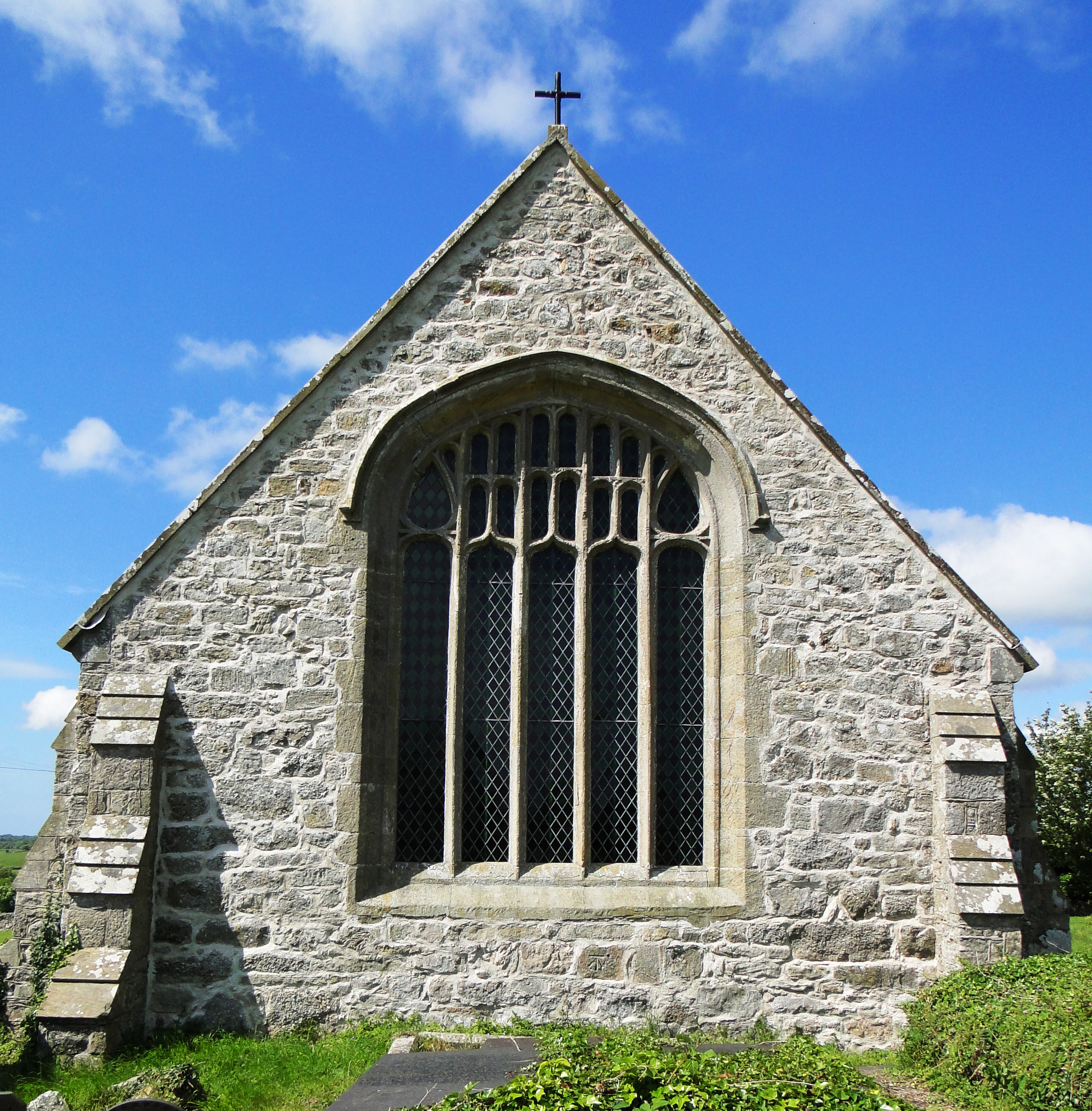
The large east window in the chancel, added in the 16th century

The church is built from rubble masonry (mainly gritstone) and dressed with freestone. The nave measures 44 feet 9 inches long by 15 feet 6 inches wide (13.6 by 4.7 m) and the chancel measures 32 feet 9 inches long by 20 feet 6 inches (10 by 6.25 m) wide. The nave has three bays, and the chancel at the east end of the nave has two bays; it is slightly wider than the nave. The nave and the chancel have external buttresses.

Internally, the chancel arch dates from the 13th century. It is 12 feet (3.7 m) wide and 19 feet (5.8 m) from the floor to the top of the arch; the supporting pillars are 10 feet (3.0 m) tall. There are windows from the early 16th century in the chancel, with the large east window in Perpendicular style (in contrast to the rest of the church, which is mainly in Decorated style). It has five ogee-headed lights separated by vertical tracery, and measures 10 feet 10 inches (3.3 m) at its widest point by 14 feet 2 inches (4.3 m) at its tallest. Unlike most of the other windows in the church, it contains coloured glass. A smaller window in the north wall also dates from this time, and has a square frame containing two lights; a matching window was added in the 19th century in the opposite wall. The other windows in the church are from the 19th century in various designs. One window, in the north wall of the nave, has had stained glass added as a memorial to two local residents who died in the 1990s.

The entrance is through a porch (probably dating from the 16th century) on the south side of the building, at the west end of the nave. At the west end of the roof, which is made of slate, there is an ornate bellcote for one bell (added by Kennedy). There are plain iron crosses on top of the porch and the chancel. Inside, the rafters and trusses of the roof are exposed. The pews and choir stalls were added in the 19th century. The nave has a brass memorial to a former Chancellor of Bangor Cathedral, William Morgan (died 1713), his wife and son. There are other memorials inside the church, including one for those from the parish who died during the First World War.

The gritstone circular font, at the west end, dates from the 12th century, and has six decorative panels. It is one of a group of fonts in north-west Wales using interlace (a medieval decorative style) showing links to Irish and Norse artistic traditions; other similar fonts in Anglesey are found at St Ceinwen's, Cerrigceinwen, St Peter's, Newborough and St Beuno's, Trefdraeth. One author says that the patterns on the fonts at Llangristiolus and St Beuno's Church, Pistyll (in the nearby county of Gwynedd) seem "closely linked" to patterns on one of the stone crosses at St Seiriol's Church, Penmon.

== Churchyard ==
The churchyard contains six Commonwealth war graves: in the east part of the ground are buried two British Army soldiers of World War I and north-north-west of the church are buried three soldiers and an airman of World War II.

== Assessment ==
The church has national recognition and statutory protection from alteration as it has been designated as a Grade II* listed building – the second-highest (of three) grade of listing, designating "particularly important buildings of more than special interest". It was given this status on 30 January 1968, and has been listed because it is a medieval church that, unusually for Anglesey, dates substantially from the 12th and 13th centuries. Cadw (the Welsh Assembly Government body responsible for the built heritage of Wales and the inclusion of Welsh buildings on the statutory lists) also notes the "fine 16th-century rebuilding of the chancel" and the chancel window. The chancel arch has been described (in a 2009 guide to the buildings of north-west Wales) as the best such arch in the region, and the "fine" east window as "almost too big to fit" in the wall.

The 19th-century antiquarian Angharad Llwyd described the church as "a spacious structure, exhibiting some excellent architectural details, and decorated with an east window, of good design, enriched with tracery." Writing in 1846 (before Kennedy's restoration work in 1852), the clergyman and antiquarian Harry Longueville Jones noted a wooden gallery at the west end, above the font, inscribed RICHARDUS DE GREY FECIT 1778. LAUS DEO. He described the chancel arch as displaying "workmanship of good character."

The Welsh politician and church historian Sir Stephen Glynne visited the church in 1849. He wrote that it was a "fair specimen of the better sort of Anglesey village church". The nave and chancel were "of good proportions", with the chancel "properly distinguished and developed". He also said that the chancel arch was "of considerable elegance, unusual in North Wales, having excellent moulding and clustered shafts which have a Middle Pointed character."
