= Abbeyford Leisure =

British holiday park operator

- Company type: Private Limited Company
- Industry: Leisure / Holiday
- Founded: 1950s as Abbeyford Caravan and Trailer Company Ltd
- Headquarters: Pensarn, North Wales
- Number of locations: 6 holiday parks (3 in Wales and 3 in Scotland)
- Key people: David J Evans (Chairman)
- Number of employees: 50
- Website: abbeyford.com

Abbeyford Leisure has been operating holiday parks for over 50 years, with holiday parks across coastal Fife in Scotland.

== Abbeyford Leisure Holiday Parks ==
- Elie Holiday Park, Fife, Scotland
- St Andrews Holiday Park, Fife, Scotland
- St Monans Holiday Park, Fife, Scotland
