= North Expressway =

North Expressway may refer to:

- North Luzon Expressway in the Philippines
- North Wales Expressway or A55 road in Wales and England
