= Malltraeth Marsh =

Marshland in Anglesey, Wales

Coordinates: 53.216°N 4.333°W

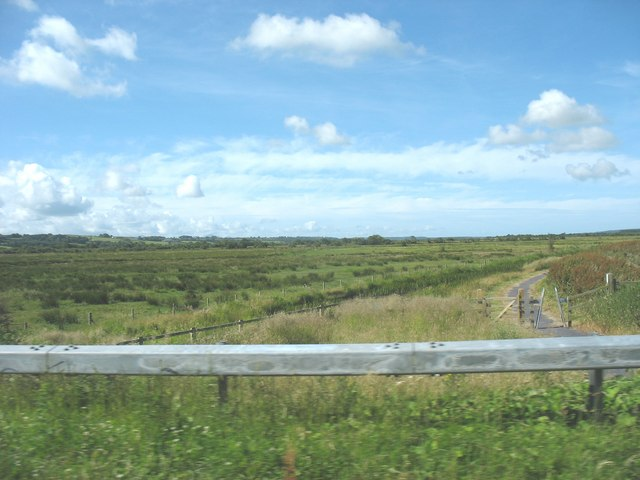
Malltraeth Marsh flatlands near the village of Pentre Berw

Malltraeth Marsh (also spelled as Malldraeth; Welsh: Cors Malltraeth or Cors Ddyga) is a large marsh area in Anglesey, North Wales, north-east of Malltraeth village, along the flatlands of Trefdraeth, Bodorgan, Llangristiolus and south of Cefn Cwmwd, Rhostrehwfa. It was reclaimed from estuarine marshes after the construction of the Malltraeth Cob (dyke), a 1 mile (1.6 km) long embankment, and the subsequent canalisation in 1824 of the Afon Cefni.

The name Malltraeth comes from mall ('bad'), and traeth ('sandy shore'). The marsh measures 1,366.5 hectares (3,377 acres) in area. The area is recognised as a Site of Special Scientific Interest (SSSI), and has a range of reedbeds, marshes, wet grassland and small pools/lakes.

== History ==
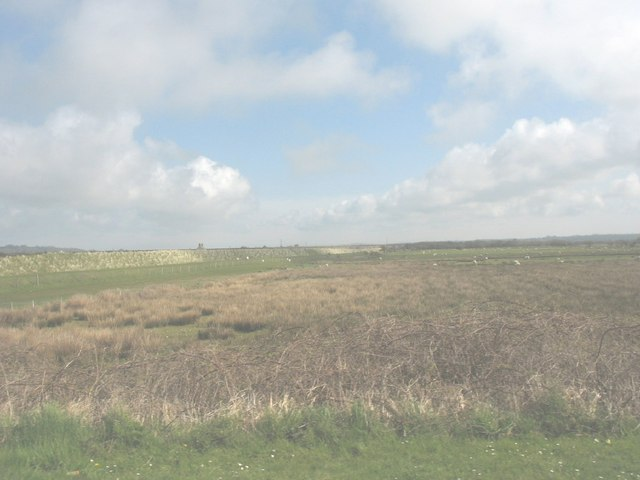
Malltraeth Marsh and the Cefni flood embankment

In the Middle Ages the Malltraeth estuary was tidal, stretching as far inland as Llangefni and Ceint.

In 1790, an act of Parliament was obtained for more effectually embanking the marshes called Malltraeth and Corsddeuga, under the provisions of which 93 hectares (230 acres) were allotted to the several proprietors of land in the parish of Llangaffo. The 1,600 hectares (4,000 acres) of reclaimed alluvium at the mouth of the River Cefni subsequently underwent considerable improvements in the late-18th century and early-19th century with the introduction of embankments and flood mitigation measures. During World War I, further improvements were made due to the concerns of farmers. However the reclamation became neglected and by the end of the war, it had fallen into a bad state and was subject to numerous heated conflicts between the drainage engineer, the CWAEC, and the underfunded catchment board managing the drainage of the marsh. Bitter disputes over the marsh reached a climax with the chairman resigning from the Malltraeth Marsh and Cors Ddyga subcommittee in March 1942 and unusually high rainfall during the harvest in the following year devastating most of the cereal crops in the area. Due to pressure from local farmers, Lord Anglesey met with Robert Hudson and Megan Lloyd George in 1944 to outline ideas for improving the local habitat. Some £100,000 was allocated to developing what was about 50% derelict marsh during the war and by 1947, £147,000 had been spent on the scheme.

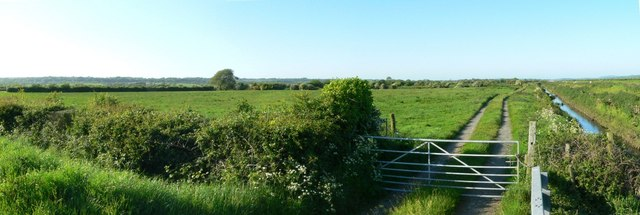
The marsh near Morfa Brennin

== Geography ==
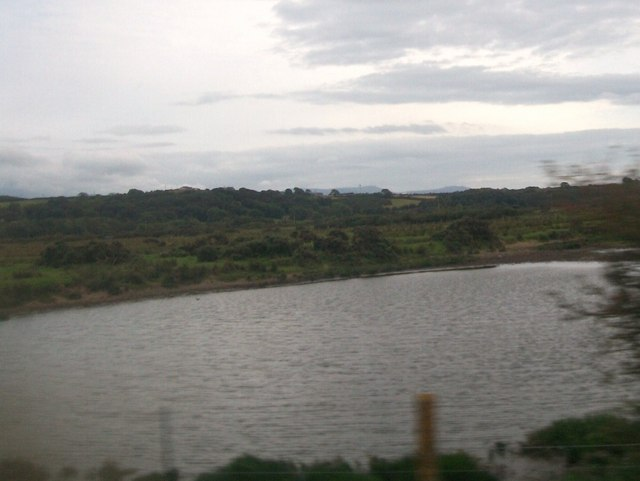
Pool alongside the railway line on the Malltraeth Marsh

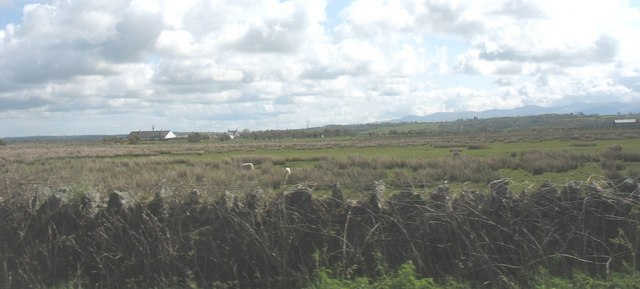
View across Malltraeth Marsh towards Pen-y-Bont Farm

Located in the cwmwd of Malltraeth, Cors Malltraeth Marsh is on the west side of the Afon Cefni valley which crosses Anglesey parallel to the Menai Strait, approximately 4 miles (6.4 km) to the north-west. The habitat of Cors Ddyga on the east side of Afon Cefni has been reverted to wetlands and reeds. The wetland reserve is officially called RSPB Cors Ddyga. It consists of marshy grasslands, lakes, pools, fossiliferous coal and shales.

The geology underlying both marshes, Cors Malltraeth and Cors Ddyga, is characterized by Carboniferous Limestone, millstone grit, soft coal measures shales, sandstone, coal seams, and Permian strata. The Afon Cefni valley is 9 miles (14 km) long and runs almost exactly parallel to the valley of the Menai Strait.

Malltraeth Marsh is a wide and perfectly flat expanse of reedy pasture. An embanked tidal river runs through its midst, opening to Malltraeth Sands, 0.5 miles (0.80 km) to the southwest. A short tunnel, the first in Anglesey, pierces the low hills which extend along the west side of Malltraeth Marsh before reaching Bodorgan railway station. Above Malltraeth lies the extensive common land of the marsh, which is bounded on the north-west by the parishes of Llangadwaladr, Trefdraeth, and Llangristiolus; on the northeast by Llangefni and Llanffinan. Cors Ddyga ("Tygai's marsh") lies in the commote of Rhosyr. It is on the east side of the Afon Cefni River or Afon Fawr Llanfihangel-y-Ceifiog, Llanidan, Llangaffo, Llangeinwen, and Newborough.

== Vegetation ==
The vegetation reported from the Malltraeth Marshand and Cors Ddyga consist of reed canary-grass, water-plantain, branched bur-reed, club rush and reed sweet-grass. Spiked water-milfoil, blunt-leaved pondweed, horned pondweed are also reported in the marsh land, apart from rare species of flowering rush, water-violet and marsh stitchwort.

== Fauna ==
European water voles inhabit the marsh. Birds such as northern lapwing, Eurasian curlew, common redshank and common snipe are reported from the lowland wet grassland. Eurasian teal, northern shoveller, gadwall and common pochard occupy the open water. Other birds recorded are Eurasian bittern and grey heron. Invertebrates include water beetles (Hydrochus brevis) and hairy dragonflies.

== Conservation ==
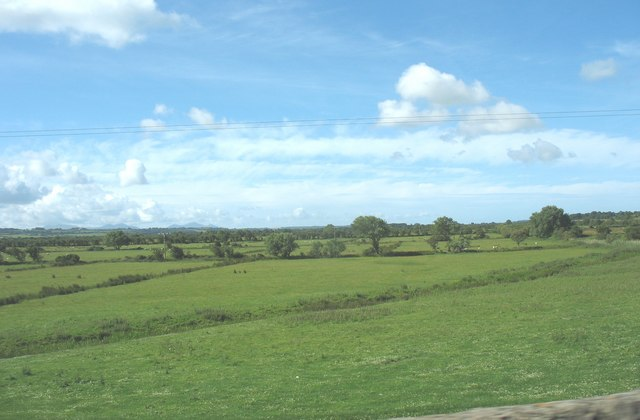
Reclaimed farmland on the western edge of the Malltraeth Marsh

Malltraeth Marsh and Cors Ddyga is a Site of Special Scientific Interest (SSSI). The marshes are notable for their breeding bird community, lowland damp grassland, reedbeds, the threatened habitat of wet meadows, and the botanical importance of their ditches and watercourses. A Royal Society for the Protection of Birds reserve is situated in the north-east corner of the SSSI.

Management options undertaken to conserve the marshland consists of: maintaining water levels by proper upkeep of clay-lined ditches to conserve flora and fauna; maintaining an exclusive swamp area to breed bittern; creation of shallow water ditches along old water courses to drain large land areas where waders can feed; establishing water control structures on secondary drains to maintain high ground water table during the spring season; control of introduced invasive plant species such as fairy fern, Australian stonecrop and Himalayan balsam; reduce risk of predation (by predators such as crows and minks) of birds by constant conservation and preservation of hedges; encouraging grazing during the winter season and reducing it during summer to attract ground nestling birds, and controlled agricultural management to provide nestling sites for waders.
