= Medwyn =

Medwyn may refer to:

== People ==
- John Hay Forbes, Lord Medwyn (1776–1854), British judge
- Medwyn Williams, 20th-21st century prize-winning Welsh gardener

== Other uses ==
- Medwyn, a character in The Chronicles of Prydain, by Lloyd Alexander

== See also ==
- North Medwyn River, Scotland
- South Medwyn River, Scotland
- Medwin, a surname
