= Medwin =

Medwin is a surname. Notable people with the surname include:

- Albert Medwin (1925–2020), American electrical engineer
- Cameron Medwin (born 1982), Canadian soccer player
- Fergus Medwin (1874-1934), Australian Labor politician
- Michael Medwin (1923–2020), English actor and film producer
- Terry Medwin (1932–2024), Welsh international footballer
- Thomas Medwin (1788–1869), English poet and translator

== Fictional characters ==
- Arthur Medwin, a character in the British soap-opera Coronation Street

== See also ==
- Medwyn (disambiguation)
- Midewin (disambiguation)
