= Special Roads Act 1949 =

Act of the Parliament of the United Kingdom

Special Roads Act 1949 (Note: Section 23(1).)
- Act of Parliament
- Parliament of the United Kingdom
- Long title: An Act to provide for the construction of roads reserved for special classes of traffic; to amend the law relating to trunk roads; and for purposes connected with the matters aforesaid.
- Citation: 12, 13 & 14 Geo. 6. c. 32
- Territorial extent: England and Wales; Scotland; (Note: Section 23(2).)

Dates
- Royal assent: 11 May 1949
- Commencement: 11 May 1949 (Note: The Acts of Parliament (Commencement) Act 1793.)
- Repealed: 16 November 1989
Other legislation
Amended by	Highways Act 1959; Road Traffic Act 1960; Town and Country Planning Act 1962; Town and Country Planning (Scotland) Act 1972; Highways Act 1980
Repealed by	Statute Law (Repeals) Act 1989
Relates to	Special Roads Act (Northern Ireland) 1963

Status: Repealed

Text of statute as originally enacted

Special Roads Act 1949

The Special Roads Act 1949 (12, 13 & 14 Geo. 6. c. 32) was an act of the Parliament of the United Kingdom that:

- Authorised the construction of special roads (that became known as motorways)
- Allowed these roads to be restricted to specific types of vehicles

The act did not apply to Northern Ireland; the later Special Roads Act (Northern Ireland) 1963 fulfilled a similar role.

== Subsequent developments ==
The act was partially repealed and replaced by the Highways Act 1959 (7 & 8 Eliz. 2. c. 25), and later the Highways Act 1980.

The whole act was repealed by section 1(1) of, and part X of schedule 1 to, the Statute Law (Repeals) Act 1989, which came into force on 16 November 1989.
