= Richard Owen (minister) =

Welsh Calvinistic Methodist minister and preacher

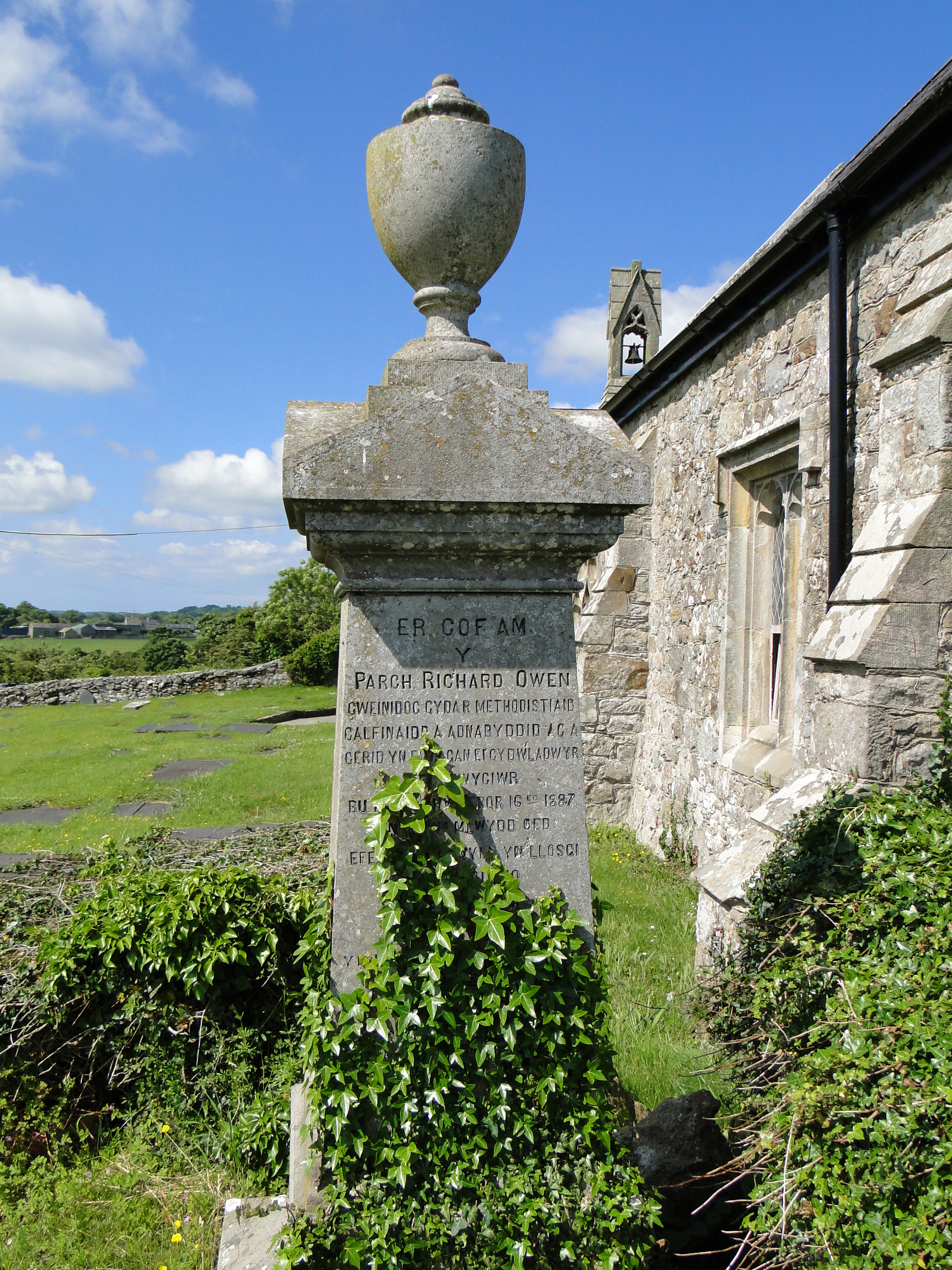
Owen's memorial at St Cristiolus's Church, Llangristiolus, Anglesey

Richard Owen (1839 – 16 February 1887) was a Welsh Calvinistic Methodist minister and preacher.

== Life and career ==
Richard Owen was born in 1839 in Llangristiolus, Anglesey, in north Wales. His education was disrupted by the deaths of his father (when Richard was 11) and, in the following year, of his brother. He began his work at a chapel called Cana in the area, later putting himself forward for an official position in the ministry of the Calvinistic Methodist church. He was permitted to preach in seven churches, and given financial support to attend the school in Llangefni, Anglesey. He started studying at the Calvinistic Methodists' college in Bala, Gwynedd but found it hard to benefit from studying there because of his preaching commitments. He impressed the college's principal, Lewis Edwards, when both preached at a service in Blaenau Ffestiniog. After marrying in 1867 and a period in London, he was ordained in 1873. Based at Penmaenmawr on the north Wales coast, he was regarded as an inspiring preacher and "his influence spread throughout Wales." After living in Denbigh and Aberystwyth, he died in Pentraeth, Anglesey, on 16 February 1887; he is buried at St Cristiolus's Church, Llangristiolus.
