= Conwy RSPB reserve =

Wetland nature reserve in north Wales

Coordinates: 53.277°N 3.802°W

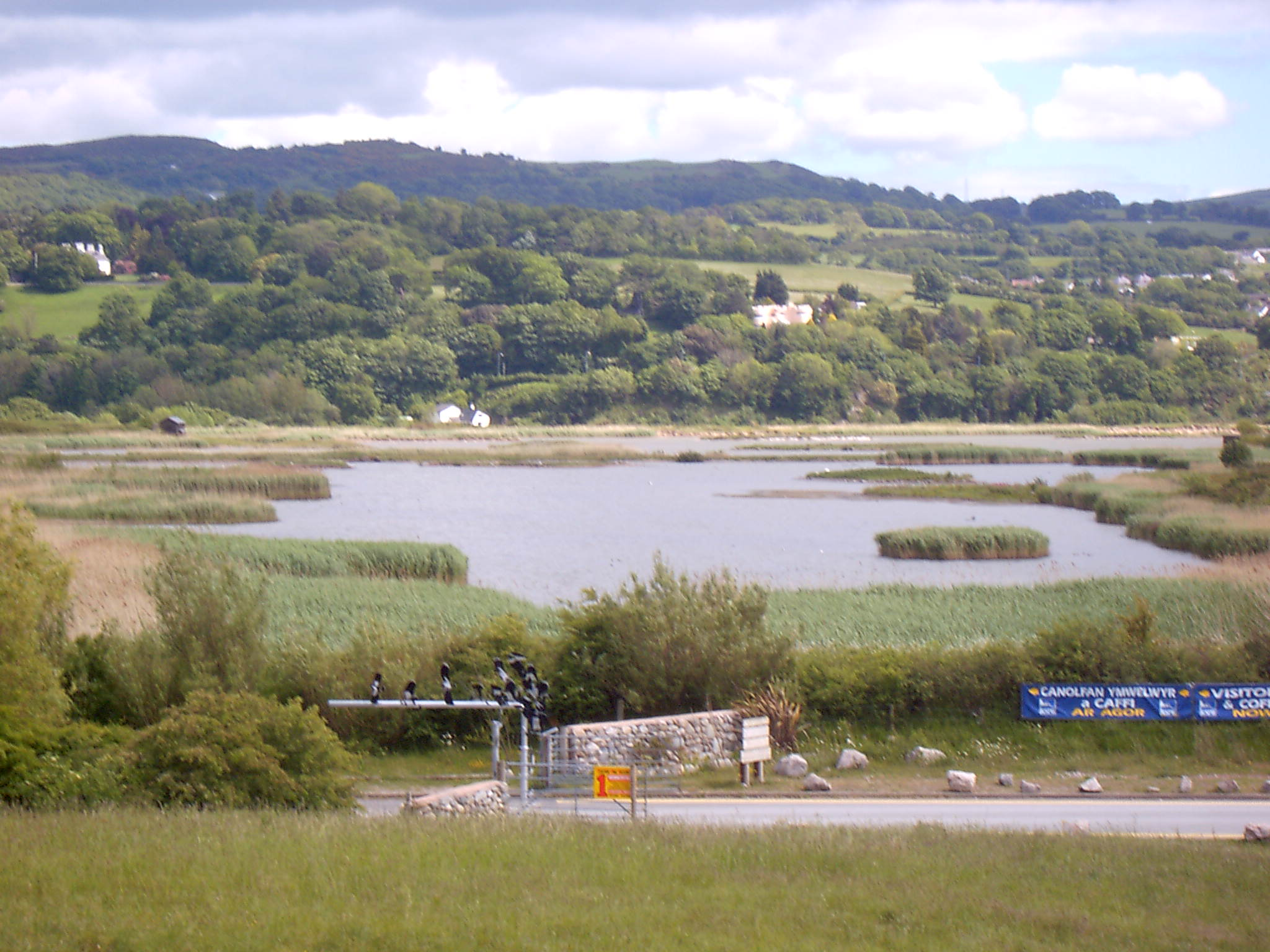
View over the reserve.

Conwy RSPB reserve (formerly RSPB Glan Conwy) is a nature reserve of the Royal Society for the Protection of Birds situated on the east side of the Conwy estuary in Conwy County Borough, North Wales. It covers 47 hectares (114 acres) and protects a variety of habitats including grassland, scrubland, reedbeds, salt marsh and mudflats. It was created as compensation for the destruction of areas of wildlife habitat during the construction of the A55 road tunnel under the estuary between 1986 and 1991. Waste from dredging was dumped onto the site which was later landscaped to create two large pools and several smaller ones. The reserve opened to the public on 14 April 1995 and facilities for visitors now include a visitor centre, café and three hides. A farmers' market is held on the reserve car park each month.

Over 220 species of bird have been recorded on the reserve, including lapwing, little ringed plover, skylark and reed warbler. Large numbers of ducks and waders are present outside the breeding season, together with water rails and a large roost of starlings. Vagrant birds have included the stilt sandpiper, Terek sandpiper, broad-billed sandpiper and alpine swift.

Other wildlife includes otter, stoat and weasel along with 11 species of dragonfly and damselfly and 22 different butterflies. The reserve has become increasingly well-vegetated and 273 species of plant have been found. Stands of common reed and areas of willow and alder have been planted.
