= Llangristiolus =

Village and community in Anglesey, Wales

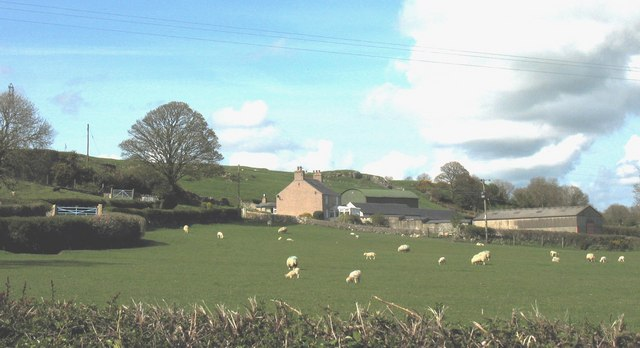
- Sheep at Tan-yr-Allt Farm, Llangristiolus

- Location within Anglesey
- Population: 1,357 (2011)
- OS grid reference: SH4373
- Principal area: Anglesey
- Preserved county: Gwynedd
- Country: Wales
- Sovereign state: United Kingdom
- Post town: BODORGAN
- Postcode district: LL62
- Dialling code: 01248
- Police: North Wales
- Fire: North Wales
- Ambulance: Welsh
- UK Parliament: Ynys Môn
- Senedd Cymru – Welsh Parliament: Bangor Conwy Môn
- List of places UK Wales Anglesey 53.235°N 4.345°W Map of the community

Llangristiolus is a village and community in the middle of Anglesey, Wales, southwest of Llangefni, and is named after Saint Cristiolus. The River Cefni flows through the village. The village is within a mile of the A5 and A55 roads. The village of Rhostrehwfa is in the community.

The church of St Cristiolus dates from the 12th century.

== Notable people ==
- Henry Maurice (ca.1647–1691), a Welsh clergyman
- Richard Owen, (1839–1887), a Welsh Calvinistic Methodist minister and preacher.
- Edward Greenly (1861–1951), English geologist, buried at Llangristiolus
- Medwyn Williams (born ca.1940), a Welsh vegetable gardener, 11 x gold medallist at the Chelsea Flower Show.
- Naomi Watts (born 1968), film actress, lived in Llangristiolus with her maternal grandparents at Llanfawr as a child.
- Rhun ap Iorwerth (born 1972), MS for Ynys Môn resides in the village
- Meinir Gwilym (born 1983), musician and broadcaster, educated at Ysgol Henblas within the village.
