= Special road =

Official classification of motorways in the United Kingdom

A special road is a road or highway (these terms have different meaning in different jurisdictions in the UK) in the United Kingdom reserved for use by special classes of traffic; such roads include but are not limited to motorways. For a road to be designated a special road, the status must in England and Wales be provided by a scheme under the Highways Act 1980; in Scotland special roads are provided for in the Roads (Scotland) Act 1984; in Northern Ireland, legislation commenced with the Special Roads Act (Northern Ireland) 1963 (c. 12 (N.I.)).

== The Special Roads Act 1949 ==
The passing of the Special Roads Act 1949 (12, 13 & 14 Geo. 6. c. 32) through Parliament allowed authorities in Great Britain to construct roads that were not automatically rights of way for certain types of user. Existing roads were mostly rights of way for all road users, including pedestrians, so it was not possible to build roads designated only for motorised traffic. The act therefore allowed the construction of motorways.

The Special Roads Act 1949 was in England and Wales partly repealed by the Highways Act 1959 (7 & 8 Eliz. 2. c. 25).

=== The first special road ===
The Special Roads Act 1949 was first used in the late-1950s to designate the Preston By-pass in Preston, Lancashire, now largely part of the M6 motorway, as a special road.

== Classes of traffic (England and Wales) ==
Highways Act 1980 Schedule 4: Classes of Traffic for Purposes of Special Roads
Permitted on motorways
Class 1	Class 2	Class 3	Class 4	Class 5	Class 6	Class 7	Class 8	Class 9	Class 10	Class 11
Self-propelled motor vehicles 50cc> and trailers with tyred wheels (min speed 25 mph on the level, unladen with no trailer attached)	Abnormal loads, earthmovers, engineering plant, military vehicles, vehicles constructed for use overseas and attached trailers (min speed 25 mph on the level, unladen with no trailer attached)	Pedestrian-controlled motor vehicles	All motor vehicles not described in classes 1, 2, 3, 10 & 11	Animal-drawn vehicles	Vehicles not described in classes 7 & 9 drawn or propelled by pedestrians	Pedal cycles	Animals (ridden, led or driven)	Pedestrians, baby carriages and dogs on a lead	Motorcycles <50cc	Invalid carriages

== Non-motorway special roads ==
Although the majority of special roads in the UK are also motorways, there are a number of special roads that are not motorways. Quite a number of these are toll bridges, and several others are former motorways which have since been downgraded. In order to charge a toll on a newly built road, special road regulations are usually necessary.

In addition, a small number of non-motorway special roads are relatively newly built dual-carriageway roads, such as the A1 Dual Carriageway east of Edinburgh and parts of the A720 Edinburgh bypass, or parts of the A55 in North Wales. These particular roads have many of the same regulations as motorways, apart from the speed limit regulations, since that only applies to special roads which are also motorways. The usual speed limit regulations that apply to all-purpose roads do not apply to special roads, so a non-motorway special road must define a speed limit as part of its Statutory Instrument.
