= A55 road =

Major road in England and Wales

A55
- North Wales Expressway
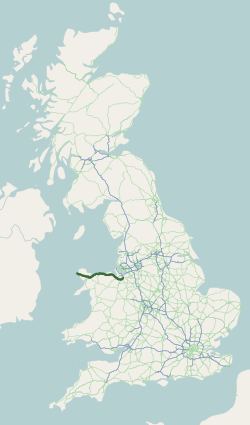

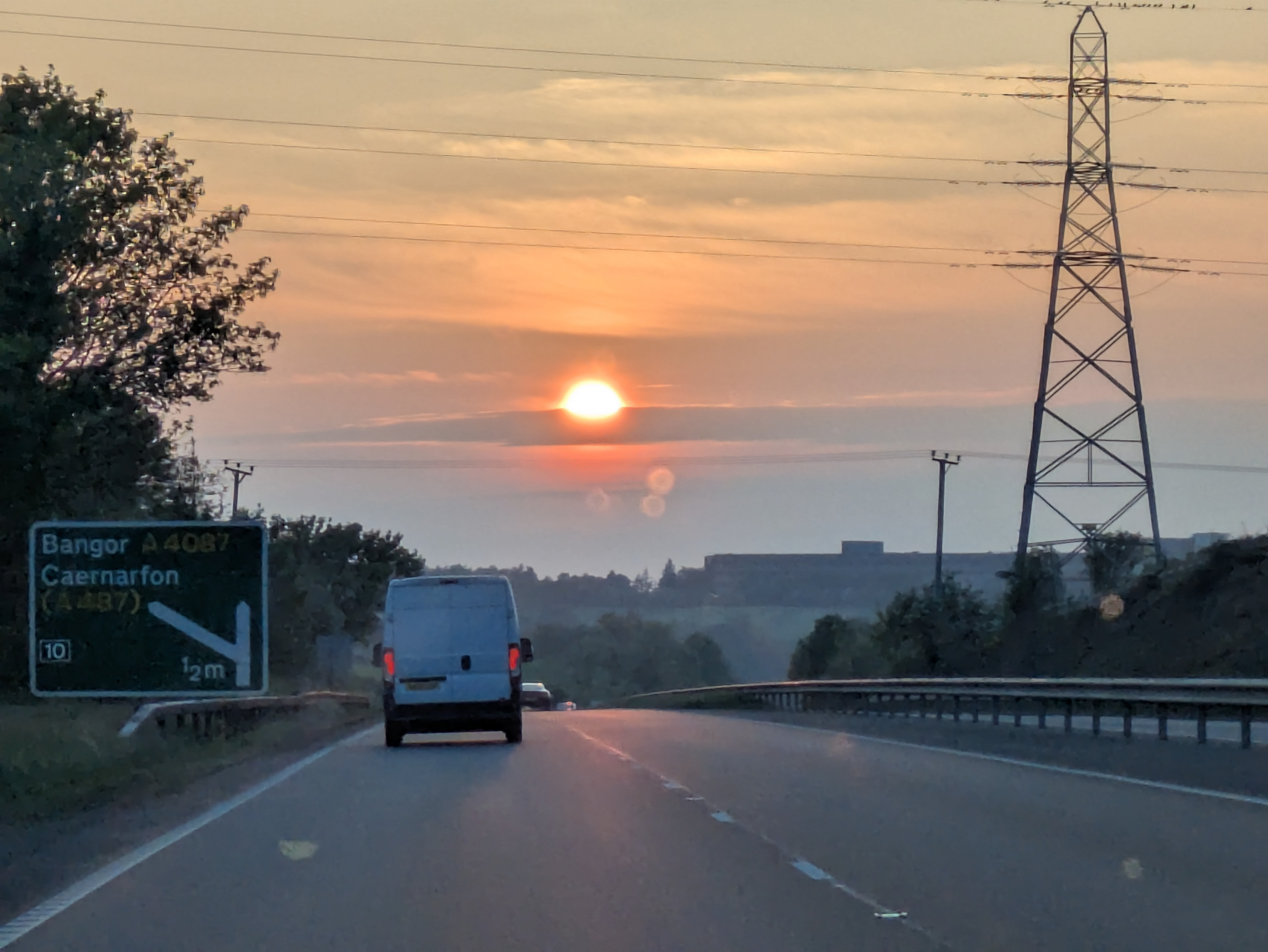
- Looking westbound towards J10 Bangor, with Ysbyty Gwynedd in the distance.

Route information
- Part of E22
- Maintained by National Highways (England); North and Mid Wales Trunk Road Agent
- Length: 87 mi (140 km)
- Existed: 1922–present
- History: Completed: 2001

Major junctions
- West end: Holyhead
- J2 ->A5153 road J5 ->A4080 road J6 ->A5114 road J7 ->A5152 road J8 ->A5025 road J9 → A487 road J10 ->A4087 road J11 → A5 road J17 ->A547 road J18 ->A546 road J19 → A470 road J23a ->A548 road J27 ->A525 road J31 ->A5151 road J32 ->A5026 road J33 ->A5119 road J34 → A494 road J35 ->A550 road J36 ->A5104 road J38 → A483 road / J39 → A41 road/A5115 road J40 → A51 road M53 motorway
- East end: Chester

Location
- Country: United Kingdom
- Counties: Anglesey, Gwynedd, Conwy, Denbighshire, Flintshire, Cheshire
- Primary destinations: Holyhead; Bangor; Conwy; Chester

Road network
- Roads in the United Kingdom; Motorways; A and B road zones

The A55, also known as the North Wales Expressway (Welsh: Gwibffordd Gogledd Cymru), is a major road in Wales and England, connecting Cheshire and North Wales. The vast majority of its length from Chester to Holyhead is a dual carriageway primary route, with the exception of the Britannia Bridge over the Menai Strait and several short sections where there are gaps in between the two carriageways. All junctions are grade separated apart from a roundabout east of Penmaenmawr and another nearby in Llanfairfechan. Initially, the road ran from Chester to Bangor. In 2001, it was extended across Anglesey to the ferry port of Holyhead parallel to the A5. The road improvements have been part funded with European money, under the Trans-European Networks programme, as the route is designated part of Euroroute E22 (Holyhead – Leeds – Amsterdam – Hamburg – Malmö – Riga – Moscow – Perm – Ekaterinburg – Ishim).

== Route ==
=== The Chester southerly bypass ===
The A55 begins at Junction 12 of the M53, the southern end of the motorway, near Chester. It is known as the Chester southerly bypass between J39 Christleton and J36a Broughton. The A55 crosses the River Dee and the border into Wales, passing close to Broughton, Flintshire, and passing north of Buckley, Penyffordd and Northop. There is a major climb between Broughton and Dobshill (Junctions 36a Broughton to 35 Dobshill) though with no crawler lane. Junction 34/33b is point at which the A494 converges and then diverges with the A55. The road briefly has a three-lane section as westbound traffic from Queensferry can leave towards Mold. In the eastbound direction another short three-lane section allows vehicles to join the A494 or exit onto the A55 to Chester. Traffic taking the A55 into England must negotiate a tight 270-degree speed-limited single lane curve to climb up and over the A55/A494 at Ewloe loops. Plans to upgrade the A494 between this junction at Ewloe and Queensferry were rejected by the Welsh Government on 26 March 2008 due to their scale.

=== Ewloe to Colwyn Bay ===
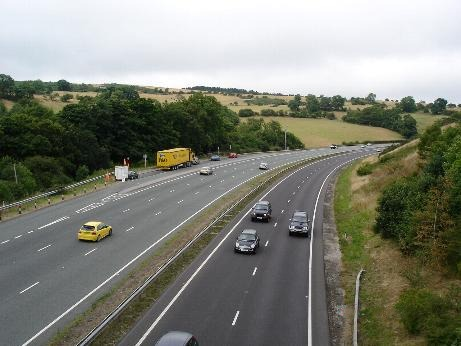
Climbing up Rhuallt Hill eastwards.

From Ewloe, the road is relatively flat until after Northop when it climbs up onto the flanks of Halkyn Mountain range, passing to the southwest of Holywell with major climbs between Northop and Halkyn (Junctions 33 and 32b) and Halkyn and Holywell Summit (Junctions 32 and 31). This section of road is notorious for poor weather conditions including fog, ice and snow in winter months. In fine weather, however there are extensive views over the River Dee estuary to the Wirral Peninsula, Liverpool and beyond. The highest part of the road is in the vicinity of Brynford at around 790 feet (240 m). The steep descent towards St Asaph is down the new Rhuallt Hill (Junctions 29 to 28), which also provides the first views of the mountains of Snowdonia in the far distance. There is a crawler lane on Rhuallt Hill for eastbound traffic. The road bypasses St Asaph to the north, and runs past Bodelwyddan and Abergele to reach the North Wales coast at Pensarn (Junction 23A). From here onwards to Bangor, the route is close to the North Wales Coast railway.

=== Colwyn Bay Bypass ===
Two sections between Junction 23 (Llanddulas) to Junction 17 (Conwy) are assigned 70 mph (110 km/h) speed limits because they are actually special roads. This is because these sections were built under legislation for building motorways but they were never declared as motorways. Legally, it means these two stretches of the A55 are neither part of the national UK motorway network nor trunk roads. As such, the national speed limit does not apply so 70 mph (110 km/h) signs (the maximum speed permitted on UK roads) are used instead. Unlike other sections of the A55 that have National Speed Limit (NSL) signage and are accessible to all motor vehicles, motorway restrictions are enforced on these two stretches of road (therefore no pedestrians, learner drivers, etc.)

A 50 mph (80 km/h) limit remains in force through the Colwyn Bay bypass (Old Colwyn to Mochdre). The restriction was imposed for several reasons - first as a safety precaution because the slip roads on this stretch are unusually short due to the road's design. Part of it was built on a narrow swathe of land through the town that was once the North Wales coast railway; Colwyn Bay railway station had to be rebuilt and the track bed realigned to complete the underpass as the road used the former railway goods yard which was relocated to Llandudno Junction. The former four-track railway was reduced to two more northerly tracks to make space for the road. Secondly, the reduced speed limit was intended to reduce road noise for residents. However, since the completion of the Colwyn Bay bypass, the lower speed limit has been an unpopular decision with drivers.

=== Conwy Tunnel ===
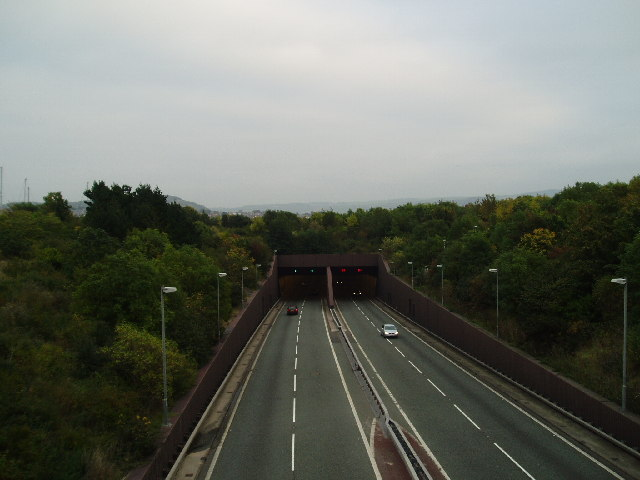
Approaching the tunnel from the west.

The crossing of the estuary of the River Conwy is by means of an immersed tube tunnel, the first of its kind constructed in the United Kingdom. At 1,060 metres (1,160 yd), the tunnel is the longest road tunnel in Wales.

The decision to construct an immersed tube tunnel bypass followed an extensive public consultation, named the Collcon Feasibility Study. This ruled out another bridge by the castle on aesthetic grounds, since it would have damaged the view of the world heritage site Conwy Castle, and the two bridges by Robert Stephenson and Thomas Telford. Another alternative bridge crossing was proposed at Deganwy, but this too was ruled out for aesthetic reasons. An inland alternative with heavy grades which would have passed over Bwlch-y-Ddeufaen pass at 430 metres (1,410 ft), following the old Roman road, was also worked up but rejected for cost and utility reasons as it would have required a very long crawler lane.

The tunnel was constructed by a Costain/Tarmac Construction joint venture, as pre-formed concrete sections, and then floated into position over a prepared trench in the bed of the estuary. The 3 million tonnes of silt and mud extracted to create the trench in which the tunnel sections sat were vacuumed to one side of the construction site, as to let them drift down river would have harmed the large mussel fishing beds downstream. The silt was deposited upstream of the bridge at Conwy which created a large new area of low-lying land which was subsequently given to the RSPB for a wildlife preserve. The casting basin for the tunnel sections was later converted into a new marina in the lower estuary. Because of the valuable fishery in the river and also because of the history of heavy metal mining in the catchment of the river, extensive ecological assessments were made both prior to the construction of the tunnel and subsequently. These studies finally concluded that no significant environmental damage had been caused.

After five years of construction, the tunnel was opened in October 1991 by Queen Elizabeth II, the tunnel initially had an advisory 50 miles per hour (80 km/h) speed limit, but this was removed in 2007 as accidents were rare in the tunnels.

=== Penmaenbach and Pen-y-clip tunnels ===
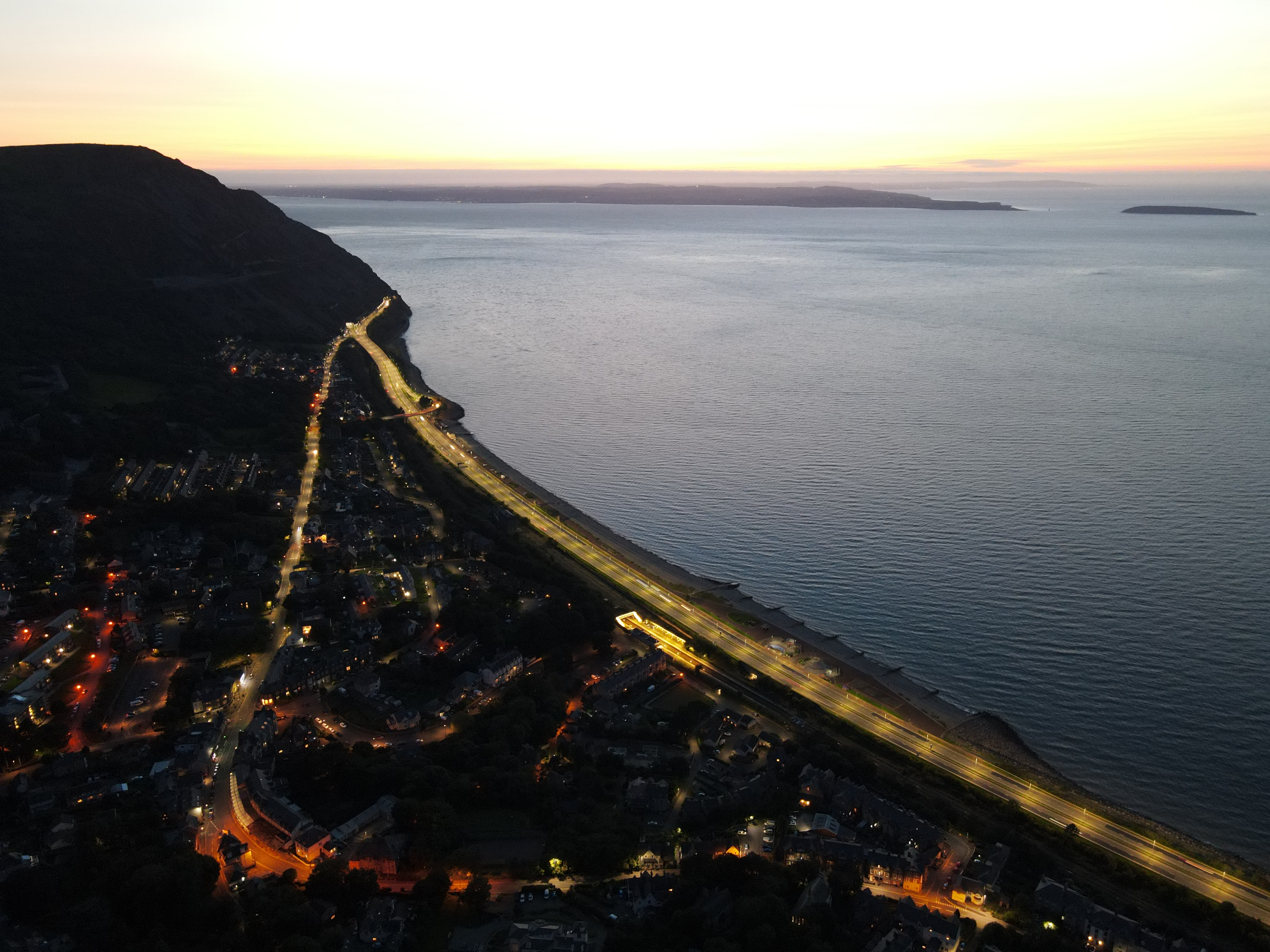
Sunset view of the A55 Expressway bypassing the older road through Penmaenmawr town centre before resuming the original route around the headland.

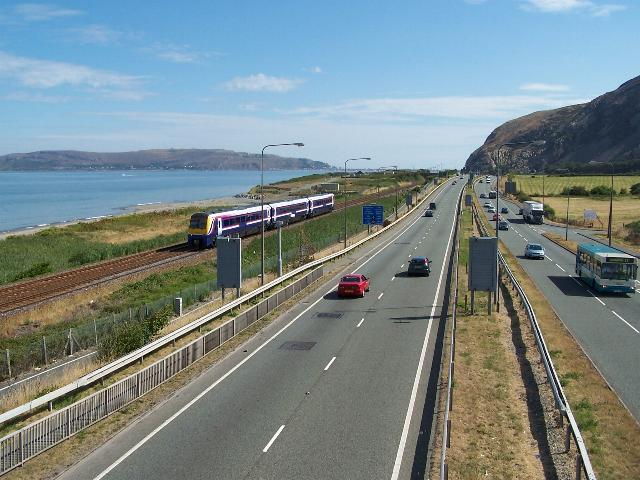
An easterly view of the A55 at Penmaenmawr with the North Wales Coast Railway on the seaward side. The Penmaenbach Tunnels are in the distance

Leaving Conwy in a westerly direction, the construction of this section has involved major civil engineering works because it crosses two major headlands: Penmaenbach Point and Penmaenan Point. Work has involved the cutting of several hard rock tunnels beneath the sea cliffs.

The first to be built in 1932 was the Penmaenbach Tunnel which carried motor traffic to Penmaenmawr. Two smaller tunnels through Penmaenan Point, opened 1935, carried the road on to Llanfairfechan. This new route, carrying traffic in both directions, relieved the original coach road built by Telford in the early 19th century. Cut into the cliffs by hand, this narrow, winding route hugged the contours around both steep headlands. Telford's route has now been converted into a cycleway across Penmaenbach and Penmaenan Points. Originally at the western end (Llanfairfechan) of the modern Pen-y-Clip tunnel, access was only allowed in an easterly direction because travelling the other way would mean heading the wrong way up the eastbound carriageway. However, in 2009 a purpose-built bridge – over the westbound carriageway – was constructed to allow unrestricted access to cyclists and walkers.

The 1930s alignment was used until a new two-lane Penmaenbach Tunnel opened in 1989 to carry westbound traffic. Eastbound traffic would now travel through the 1932 Penmaenbach Tunnel using both its original lanes. Four years later, work to build the Pen-y-clip tunnel was completed. Like at Penmaenbach it carried westbound traffic while the original road carried vehicles in the opposite direction. Both new routes were subject to an advisory 50 mph speed limit until these were lifted in 2007 as there had been few accidents.

However traffic travelling eastbound on the 1930s cliff-hugging route still faced speed restrictions at both tunnel locations. For instance the eastbound carriageway at Penmaenbach is subject to a 30 mph (50 km/h) speed limit due to sharp curves and double white lines nominally preclude lane changing. Plans to rectify the awkward alignment by building another tunnel parallel to the current westbound tunnel (as originally intended when the westbound tunnel was proposed) have been discussed for several years. The work in late-2007 at Penmaenbach eastbound has seen the erection of gantries to close lanes when bidirectional working is in place. New bridges over the railway tunnel entrances at each end were added and a footbridge over the railway at the eastern end to accommodate the cycleway.

=== Penmaenmawr to Anglesey ===
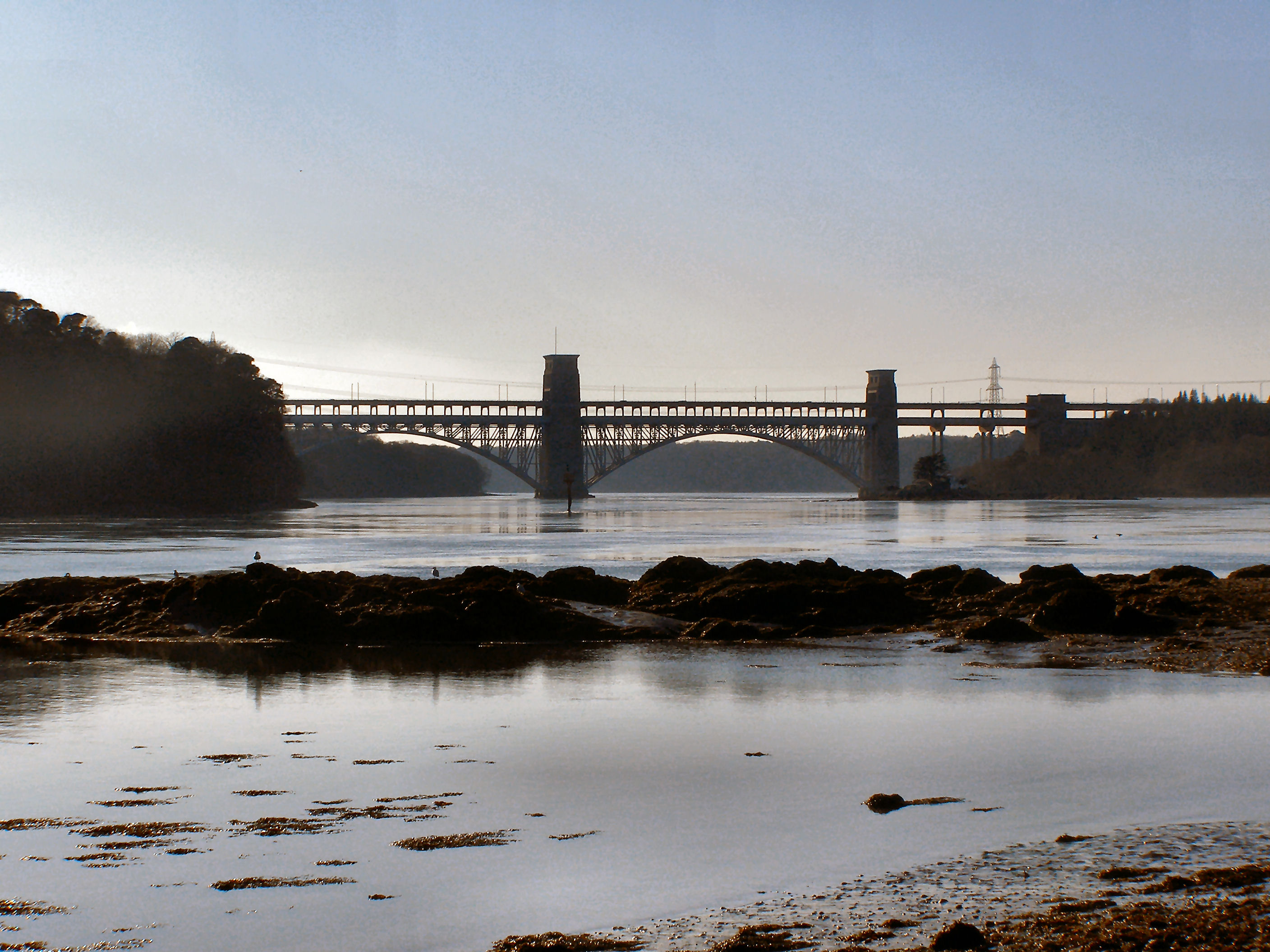
The A55 spans Britannia Bridge, connecting Anglesey to the British mainland.

Some sections of the rest of the route are of lower standard than that of those further east. Some traffic leaves for major holiday destinations such as Caernarfon or the Llŷn Peninsula, though much continues on to the port of Holyhead. As such part of the route is not classed as clearway and has two at grade junctions (roundabouts), Penmaenmawr (Junction 16) and Llanfairfechan (Junction 15). The Bangor bypass, in which the road previously terminated and became the A5 regains high standards and is such through the Anglesey section, bar the Britannia Bridge, which is a single carriageway deck above the North Wales Coast railway over the Menai Strait. In 2007 the Welsh Assembly Government undertook a consultation to determine which of four options would be preferred for another crossing. This section intersects with the A487 towards Caernarfon, and the west coast of North Wales.

=== Anglesey ===
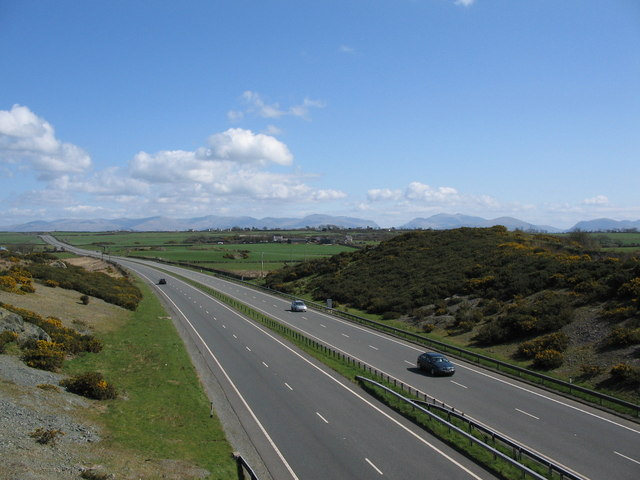
Looking east along the road in Anglesey with the mountains of Snowdonia in the background.

The final section of the A55 to be constructed was the Anglesey section. This 20 mile (32 km) section from the end of the Llanfairpwll bypass to Holyhead Harbour was constructed as a Private Finance Initiative (PFI) scheme, where the builders, a Carillion/John Laing joint venture, earn a shadow toll based on usage and lane availability. Under the PFI terms, they are also contracted to maintain the road for the extended period of their shadow toll agreement. When travelling eastbound along this section there are fine views of Snowdonia. The approach to Holyhead required major work with a new section over the sea paralleling the Stanley Embankment, which carries the original A5 and the North Wales Coast railway. This PFI road was opened in March 2001 but within the first two years there were indications of major defects in its bonding and water-proofing.

== Improvements underway ==
Work started in early 2017 on the upgrading of the 1960s built substandard section of dual carriageway west of Abergwyngregyn from Tai'r Meibion towards Tan-y-lon, which is a relatively narrow section of dual carriageway and prone to flooding. The Welsh Assembly Government (WAG) published its National Transport Plan in July 2009. After a pause, work restarted on the scheme (now known as the Abergwyngregyn-Tai'r Meibion scheme) in 2021 and encompassing some 2.2 km of the A55. It involves constructing a new road to the north of the dual carriageway for general use including cycleway and farm access. This allowed the closure of 8 central reservation gaps used by slow moving agricultural vehicles which caused safety concerns with the volume and speed of traffic on the dual carriageway. The work was well underway in September 2021 and due to open fully in 2022.

== Planned improvements ==
Plans are also in their final stages to grade separate the two roundabouts at Penmaenmawr and Llanfairfechan planned to be completed by 2022. A public inquiry was due to be held on 21 September 2021 in Llandudno Junction concerning issues over the side roads.

The two roundabout improvements will now be treated separately and the full plans can be seen on the A55 microsite.

In June 2021 the Welsh Government decided to review all road schemes whilst looking at public transport alternatives. In September 2021 the Welsh Government announced an expansion of their plans for the North Wales Metro that may impact this road scheme. In particular longer-term plans to reopen old rail routes from Bangor to Amlwch and Bangor to West Wales (presumably a link to Cambrian Coast railway and possibly onwards from Aberystwyth to Carmarthen) may impact cash available for road schemes. The Junction 16 scheme involves creating a new grade separated junction close to the Penmaenbach Tunnel with a single overbridge allowing access for all directions. This will replace the limited access junction 16A there for Dwygyfylchi. The existing junction 16 roundabout would be replaced by a limited access junction (westbound off/westbound on) as it is a difficult location close to the North Wales coast railway and cycle route and partly on a railway bridge. A new local road would run from the new Dwygyfylchi interchange to the existing roundabout passing around the rear of the Penguin Cafe/truckstop. The Llanfairfechan junction 15 grade separation is much easier to achieve and will be completed on site as a grade separated junction with a single overbridge allowing access/exit for all possible directions.

In November 2012, the Welsh Government published two more detailed studies looking at options to improve transport in the North East Wales and the A55 / A494 areas. Possible changes to be considered further include:

- applying managed motorway concepts
- providing hard shoulders
- providing crawler lanes at key points
- redesigning and improving slip roads.

== History ==
=== Origins ===
The A55 partly follows the alignment of the Roman road from Chester (Deva) to Caernarfon (Segontium), particularly from Junction 31 to 30 and Junction 13 to 12. Between Chester and Holywell the alignment of this road is uncertain and between St. Asaph and Abergwyngregyn, the Roman road followed an inland route, via Canovium Roman Fort at Caerhun, avoiding the difficulties of the crossing of the Conwy estuary and the cliffs at Penmaenbach and Pen-y-Clip.

On 1 April 1937, the route, as it was then, was classed to form the Chester–Bangor trunk road. By 2015, the Welsh Government was also classifying part of the road as part of the London–Holyhead trunk road.

=== Opening dates of major improvements ===
==== 1930s ====
- Unknown date pre-1832: Ewloe to Northop avoiding Northop Hall (shown on an OS surveyor's 1832 hand-drawn survey map in Flintshire Archives)
- 1931 or 1932 Northop Bypass
- Summer 1932 Holywell Bypass
- Unknown date 1930s? St. Asaph to Rhuallt dual carriageway and roundabouts
- Unknown date 1930s? Short section of 'experimental' concrete road west of St Asaph
- 1932 Penmaenbach Tunnel
- 1935 Pen-y-Clip Tunnels
- Post 1938 Vicar's Cross: A41/A51 interchange. (Directly over the site of Vicar's Cross, a mansion in occupation 1938 – Folliott family. This section only became the A55 on completion of the Chester southerly bypass in 1976).

==== 1950s ====
- 1958 Conwy new bridge avoiding Telford's suspension bridge opened 13 December 1958. This also included a one way system through Conwy with a new route for eastbound traffic around the town's north wall, eliminating a traffic lights at the town's narrow north gate. Originally it had been intended to go along the quay to the new bridge but this would have destroyed the harbour fishing industry.

==== 1960s ====
- 1960s Tai'r Meibion to Tan-y-lon dual carriageway east of Bangor
- 1964? Ewloe roundabout (part of the A494 Queensferry to Ewloe dualling, the 'Aston Bypass')
- Unknown date 1965? Llysfaen dualling
- 1968 Abergele Bypass

==== 1970s ====
- 1970 St. Asaph Bypass
- 1975 Northop Hall Crossroads to East of Gables
- 1976 Coed-y-Cra to Chaingates (Holywell)
- 1976 Chester Southerly Bypass (terminating at Broughton with a single carriageway section for the final mile as this was planned to be superseded by the Hawarden Bypass on a more southerly alignment)

==== 1980s ====
- 1980 Britannia Bridge and link roads
- December 1980 Holywell By-Pass (Stage 1)
- March 1981 Diversion East of Abergele
- December 1983 Bangor By-Pass
- September 1984 Hawarden By-Pass (from a point east of Broughton on the Chester Southerly Bypass to Northop Hall)
- December 1984 Llanddulas to Glan Conwy (Colwyn Bay By-Pass, Stage 1)
- June 1985 Llanddulas to Glan Conwy (Colwyn Bay By-Pass, Stage 2)
- October 1986 Holywell By-Pass (Stage 2)
- December 1986 Bodelwyddan By-Pass
- June 1989 Penmaenbach Tunnel
- June 1989 Northop By-Pass (Northop Hall to Halkyn)
- October 1989 Penmaenmawr and Llanfairfechan By-Passes (excluding Pen-y-Clip Tunnel)

==== 1990s ====
- May 1990 Travellers' Inn Improvement
- June 1991 Extension of Chester Bypass to M53 (Junction 12)
- 25 October 1991 Tunnel crossing of the River Conwy
- May 1992 Rhuallt Hill Improvement
- October 1993 Pen-y-Clip Tunnel
- October 1994 Abergwyngregyn Improvement

==== 2000s ====
- 16 March 2001 Anglesey section (Llanfairpwll to Holyhead) including Llanfairpwll by-pass
- 2000/2004 Penmaenmawr eastbound slip road and grade separation at the summit of the Rhuallt Hill
- 2004 Improvements to railway underbridges and cliffs at Penmaenbach (eastbound)
- 2007 Alterations to roundabout at Llanfairfechan and bidirectional road indicators at Penmaenbach (eastbound)
- 2008 New overbridge between Junction 32A and 32B for improved local access

== Services ==
There are three large service areas on the A55, along with numerous other petrol stations at the side of the road. The three major services are:

Bangor Services
(off J11) This service area is 200m off A55 via A5 southbound then turn right at roundabout onto A4244 before immediately turning right into services) – Starbucks, Subway, Greggs, Burger King, Travelodge, Esso, Costa Express

Gateway Services, Ewloe
Eastbound (After J33) – Starbucks, Greggs, Travelodge, Shell, Costa Express
Westbound (After J33B) – Costa Coffee, Subway, McDonald's, OK Diner, Holiday Inn, Shell, Costa Express, Deli2Go

Kinmel Park, St Asaph
Eastbound (After J24) – Esso, Starbucks and Greggs

Westbound (After J25) – Esso, Starbucks and Greggs

== Junctions ==
| County | Location | Miles | km | Junction | Destinations | Notes |
|---|---|---|---|---|---|---|
| Isle of Anglesey | Holyhead | 0.0 | 0.0 | – (Note: 53.30748°N 4.63010°W) | Holyhead railway station, Holyhead ferry port, Fish quay, Park and ride, Long stay | Roundabout |
| Isle of Anglesey | Holyhead | | | – (Note: 53.30641°N 4.62933°W) | Local traffic | Traffic lights, TOTSO |
| Isle of Anglesey | Holyhead | 0.3 | 0.5 | – (Note: 53.30625°N 4.63184°W) | A5154 - Town centre | Traffic lights, TOTSO |
| Isle of Anglesey | Holyhead | 0.4 | 0.7 | 1 (Note: 53.30446°N 4.63023°W) | B4545 - Trearddur Bay Kingsland | Terminus of the North Wales Expressway, Roundabout |
| Isle of Anglesey | Holyhead | 0.7; 1.2 | 1.2; 2.0 | 2 (Note: 53.29916°N 4.62268°W) | A5153 - Trearddur Bay; Parc Cybi | |
| Isle of Anglesey | Valley | 4.4; 4.8 | 7.1; 7.7 | 3 (Note: 53.27895°N 4.54977°W) | A5 - Valley, Caergeiliog | |
| Isle of Anglesey | Llanfihangel yn Nhowyn | 6.0; 6.3 | 9.6; 10.2 | 4 (Note: 53.27549°N 4.51407°W) | A5 - Caergeiliog, Bryngwran Bodedern | |
| Isle of Anglesey | Bryngwran | 8.7; 9.1 | 14.0; 14.6 | 5 (Note: 53.26163°N 4.45448°W) | A4080 - Rhosneigr, Aberffraw | |
| Isle of Anglesey | Llangefni | 14.4; 14.9 | 23.2; 24.0 | 6 (Note: 53.23906°N 4.32535°W) | A5 - Rhostrehwfa, Pentre Berw A5114 - Llangefni | |
| Isle of Anglesey | Gaerwen | 17.3; 17.8 | 27.8; 28.6 | 7 (Note: 53.22603°N 4.26042°W) | A5152 - Gaerwen, Pentre Berw, Llanfair Pwllgwyngyll | |
| Isle of Anglesey | Llanfair Pwllgwyngyll | 19.4 | 31.3 | 7a (Note: 53.22268°N 4.21643°W) | A5 - Llanfair Pwllgwyngyll; Star | No access to A55 Westbound, no access to or exit from A55 Eastbound |
| Isle of Anglesey | Llanfair Pwllgwyngyll | 20.4; 20.8 | 32.9; 33.4 | 8 (Note: 53.22444°N 4.19122°W) | A5025 - Benllech, Menai Bridge, Amlwch | |
| Isle of Anglesey | Llanfair Pwllgwyngyll | 21.0 | 33.8 | 8a (Note: 53.22023°N 4.18907°W) | A5 - Llanfair Pwllgwyngyll, Menai Bridge, Beaumaris | No access to A55 Westbound, no exit from A55 Eastbound |
| Gwynedd | Bangor | 21.9; 22.1 | 35.3; 35.6 | 9 (Note: 53.20596°N 4.17504°W) | A487 - Bangor, Caernarfon | |
| Gwynedd | Bangor | 22.6; 23.0 | 36.4; 37.0 | 10 (Note: 53.20491°N 4.15830°W) | A4087 - Bangor | |
| Gwynedd | Bangor | 25.0; 25.4 | 40.3; 40.9 | 11 (Note: 53.20484°N 4.10661°W) | Bangor services A5 - Bangor, Betws-y-Coed | |
| Gwynedd | Tal-y-bont | 27.1; 27.5 | 43.6; 44.2 | 12 (Note: 53.22049°N 4.06438°W) | Tal-y-bont | |
| Gwynedd | Abergwyngregyn | 29.3; 29.5 | 47.2; 47.5 | 13 (Note: 53.23491°N 4.01814°W) | Abergwyngregyn | |
| Gwynedd | Llanfairfechan | 30.4; 30.6 | 48.9; 49.2 | 14 (Note: 53.24423°N 3.99857°W) | Llanfairfechan | |
| Conwy | Llanfairfechan | 32.1 | 51.7 | 15 (Note: 53.26024°N 3.97231°W) | Llanfairfechan | Roundabout |
| Conwy | Penmaenmawr | 33.4; 33.7 | 53.8; 54.2 | 15a (Note: 53.26788°N 3.93652°W) | Penmaenmawr | No access to A55 Eastbound, no exit from A55 Westbound |
| Conwy | Penmaenmawr | 34.9 | 56.2 | 16 (Note: 53.27595°N 3.91015°W) | Penmaenmawr, Dwygyfylchi | Roundabout |
| Conwy | Dwygyfylchi | | | Services (Note: 53.28060°N 3.89965°W) | | |
| Conwy | Dwygyfylchi | 35.9 | 57.8 | 16a (Note: 53.28453°N 3.89146°W) | Dwygyfylchi | No access to or exit from A55 Eastbound |
| Conwy | Conwy | 37.5; 37.9 | 60.4; 61.0 | 17 (Note: 53.28889°N 3.85257°W) | A547 - Conwy | Terminus of special road |
| Conwy | Llandudno Junction | 39.5; 39.9 | 63.6; 64.2 | 18 (Note: 53.28095°N 3.80951°W) | A546 - Deganwy, Llandudno Junction | |
| Conwy | Llandudno Junction | 40.3; 40.7 | 64.8; 65.5 | 19 (Note: 53.28026°N 3.79121°W) | A470 - Betws-y-Coed, Llandudno | |
| Conwy | Rhos-on-Sea-Colwyn Bay boundary | 42.7; 43.4 | 68.7; 69.8 | 20 (Note: 53.30042°N 3.74142°W) | B5115 - Rhos-on-Sea | |
| Conwy | Colwyn Bay | 43.9; 44.1 | 70.6; 71.0 | 21 (Note: 53.29541°N 3.72207°W) | B5104 - Colwyn Bay | |
| Conwy | Old Colwyn | 44.4; 44.7 | 71.5; 72.0 | 22 (Note: 53.29298°N 3.70763°W) | Old Colwyn | |
| Conwy | Llanddulas | 47.2; 47.3 | 76.0; 76.1 | 23 (Note: 53.29092°N 3.64433°W) | A547 - Llandulas | Terminus of special road |
| Conwy | Llanddulas | | | Services (Note: 53.29182°N 3.63506°W) | | |
| Conwy | Pensarn | 49.7; 50.0 | 80.0; 80.4 | 23a (Note: 53.29269°N 3.58227°W) | A548 - Pensarn, Rhyl | No access to A55 Eastbound, no exit from A55 Westbound |
| Conwy | Abergele | 50.5; 50.9 | 81.2; 81.9 | 24 (Note: 53.28450°N 3.57030°W) | A547 - Abergele, Rhuddlan, Prestatyn | |
| Conwy | St George | 52.6 | 84.6 | 24a (Note: 53.27311°N 3.53532°W) | Towyn, St George | No access to A55 Westbound, no access to or exit from A55 Eastbound |
| Denbighshire | Bodelwyddan | | | Services (Note: 53.26910°N 3.51908°W) | Kinmel Park services | |
| Denbighshire | Bodelwyddan | 53.7 | 86.4 | 25 (Note: 53.26609°N 3.50211°W) | Bodelwyddan, Glan Clwyd Hospital | |
| Denbighshire | St Asaph | 54.8; 55.2 | 88.2; 88.8 | 26 (Note: 53.26218°N 3.47726°W) | St Asaph Business Park | |
| Denbighshire | St Asaph | 55.9; 56.3 | 89.9; 90.6 | 27 (Note: 53.26095°N 3.45266°W) | A525 - St Asaph, Rhyl | |
| Denbighshire | St Asaph | 56.9 | 91.6 | 27a (Note: 53.26276°N 3.43265°W) | A525 - Denbigh | No access to or exit from A55 Westbound |
| Denbighshire | Rhuallt | 57.2; 57.9 | 92.9; 93.2 | 28 (Note: 53.26270°N 3.41070°W) | B5429 - Rhuallt, Tremeirchion Trefnant | |
| Denbighshire | Rhuallt | 60.1; 60.5 | 96.7; 97.3 | 29 (Note: 53.27369°N 3.36096°W) | B5429 - Rhuallt, Tremeirchion | |
| Flintshire | Lloc | 61.5; 61.7 | 99.0; 99.3 | 30 (Note: 53.27108°N 3.33141°W) | Tremeirchion | |
| Flintshire | Lloc | 62.3; 62.6 | 100.3; 100.8 | 31 (Note: 53.27325°N 3.30776°W) | A5026 - Holywell A5151 - Prestatyn; B5112 - Caerwys | |
| Flintshire | Pentre Halkyn | 67.5; 67.6 | 108.7; 108.8 | 32 (Note: 53.24956°N 3.20082°W) | A5026 - Holywell | No access to A55 Eastbound, no exit from A55 Westbound |
| Flintshire | Pentre Halkyn | 67.9; 68.3 | 109.3; 109.9 | 32a (Note: 53.24424°N 3.19303°W) | B5123 - Rhosesmor | No access to A55 Westbound |
| Flintshire | Halkyn | 69.2 | 111.3; 111.4 | 32b (Note: 53.23130°N 3.17522°W) | Pentre Halkyn, Rhosesmor | No access to or exit from A55 Westbound |
| Flintshire | Northop | 71.2; 71.6 | 114.6; 115.3 | 33 (Note: 53.21253°N 3.13140°W) | A5119 - Flint, Mold | |
| Flintshire | Northop Hall | 72.4 | 116.5 | 33a (Note: 53.20433°N 3.11771°W) | B5126 - Connah's Quay Northop Hall | |
| Flintshire | Northop Hall | | | Services (Note: 53.19209°N 3.08061°W) | Gateway services | |
| Flintshire | Ewloe | 74.6 | 120.0 | 33b (Note: 53.18863°N 3.07244°W) | A494 - Mold | No access to A55 Westbound, no exit from A55 Eastbound. Terminus of concurrency with A494 |
| Flintshire | Ewloe | 74.9; 75.2 | 120.5; 121.1 | 34 (Note: 53.18754°N 3.06428°W) | A494 - Queensferry | Terminus of concurrency with A494, TOTSO |
| Flintshire | Buckley | 76.5; 76.8 | 123.1; 123.6 | 35 (Note: 53.16877°N 3.03800°W) | A550 - Buckley, Wrexham | |
| Flintshire | Broughton | 77.9; 78.2 | 125.3; 125.9 | 36 (Note: 53.16121°N 3.00723°W) | A5104 - Pen-y-ffordd, Broughton | |
| Flintshire | Bretton | 79.8 | 128.5 | 37 (Note: 53.16339°N 2.97204°W) | Broughton | No exit from A55 Eastbound, no access to A55 Westbound |
| Cheshire | Chester | | | 38 (Note: 53.15637°N 2.91342°W) | A483 - Wrexham, Chester | |
| Cheshire | Chester | | | 39 (Note: 53.17947°N 2.85509°W) | A41 - Whitchurch A5115 - Chester | No access to A55 Northbound, no exit from A55 Southbound |
| Cheshire | Chester | | | 40 (Note: 53.19503°N 2.84462°W) | A51 - Chester, Nantwich | |
| Cheshire | Chester | | | 41 (Note: 53.21164°N 2.85252°W) | M53 - Ellesmere Port A56 - Chester, Helsby | Road continues as M53 towards Ellesmere Port |
1.000 mi = 1.609 km; 1.000 km = 0.621 mi: Incomplete access

Notes

- Data from location marker posts are used to provide distance and carriageway identification information. Where a junction spans several hundred metres and the data is available, both the start and finish values for the junction are shown.
- Coordinate data from ACME mapper

Coordinate list

== See also ==
- Trunk roads in Wales
