= Rhystyd =

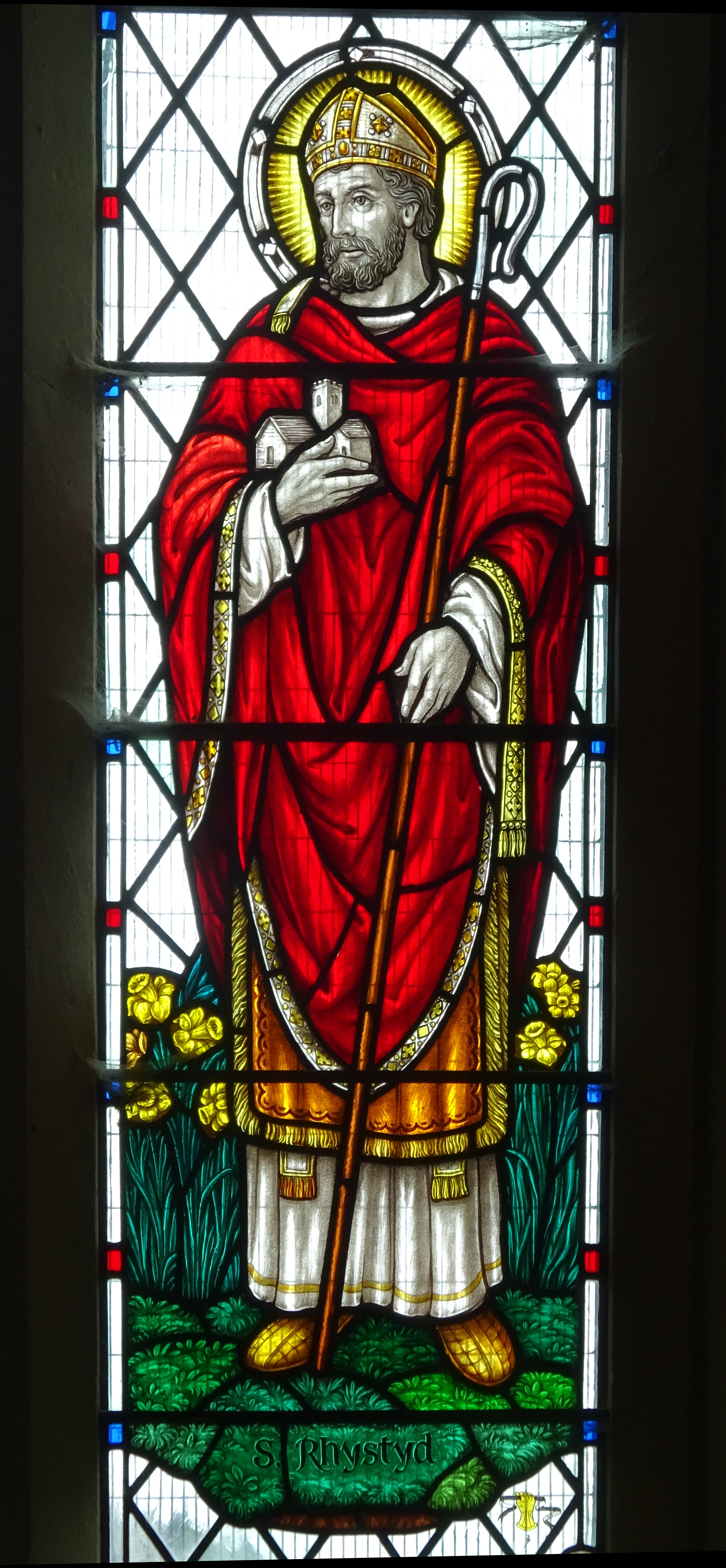
Saint Rhystyd depicted in a stained glass window at St Rhystud's Church, Ceredigion.

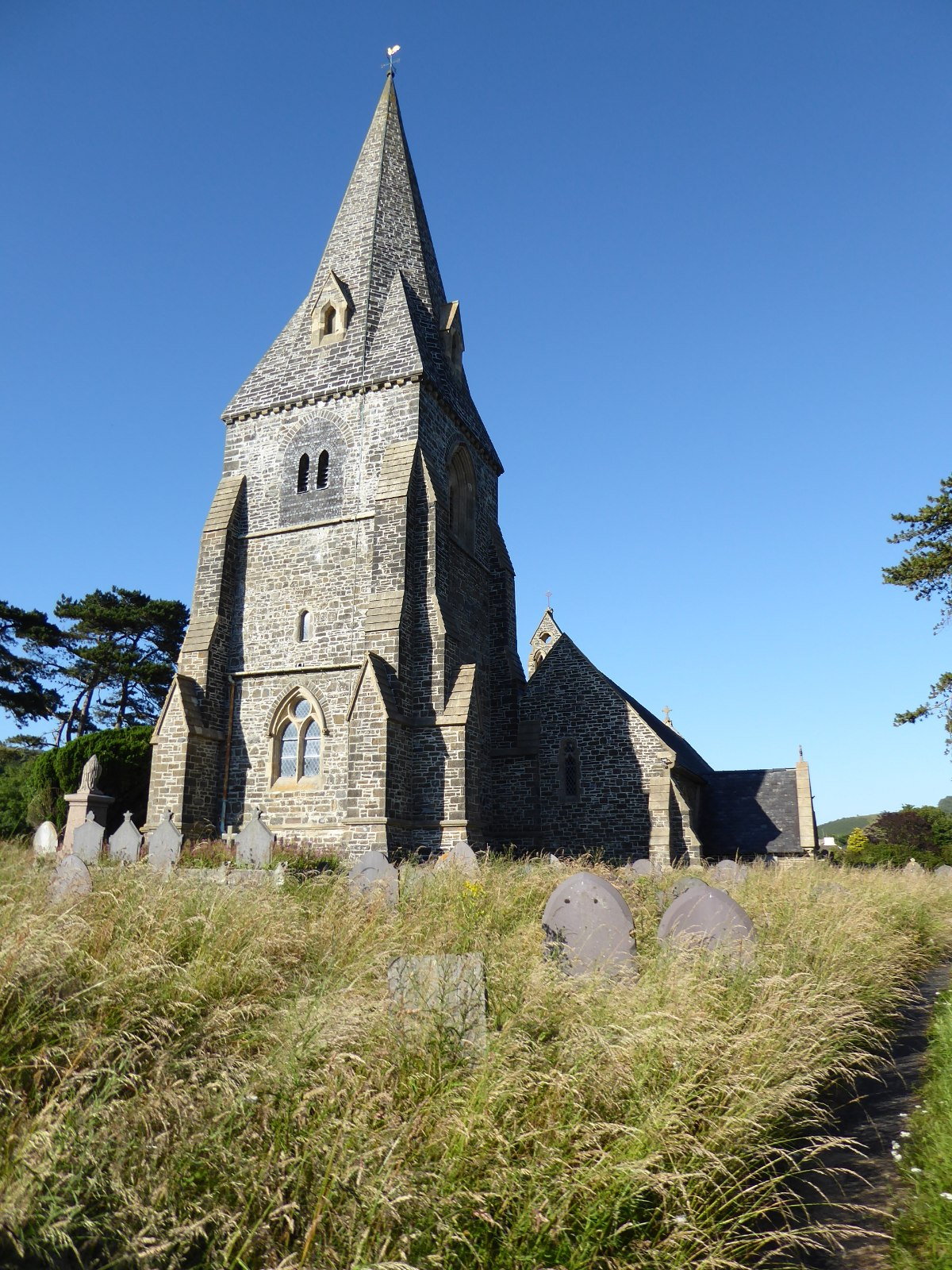
St Rhystyd's church, Llanrhystud

Rhystyd was a late 6th-century British saint reputed to be a grandson of Hywel the Great (Hywel fab Emyr Llydaw) and brother to Saint Cristiolus and Saint Silin. The village of Llanrhystud is named for the parish church which is dedicated to him.

== Name ==
Rhystyd is thought to represent the Latin Restitutus, a common ecclesicatical name borne by the earliest known Bishop of London who attended the Council of Arles in 314. The name also appears as Rhystud. He is sometimes confused with a Saint Rhystyd Hên who was Bishop of Caerleon-on-Usk.

== Veneration ==
His feast is said to have been celebrated on the "Thursday in the Ember Week before Christmas" in the form of a fair. The Ember Week before Christmas traditionally takes place in the 51st week of the year (the penultimate week in non-leap years).

An apocryphal poem by the celebrated 14th century Welsh bard Dafydd ap Gwilym associates Rhystyd with Saint Dwynwen, the Welsh patron saint of lovers:

Rhystud Sant, rhyw ystod serch,

A'i elinedd ar lanerch,

A'i ben ar Ddwynwen enyd,

Huno bu'n hwya'n y byd

[Saint Rhystyd, during some period of love

And his elbows on the glade

And his head on Dwynwen for a while

Slept the longest in the world]

— Dafydd ap Gwilym, "Yr Hun Felys", lines 51–54

A stained-glass window depicting Rhystyd dating to 1965 is located on the eastern wall of the south aisle of St Rhystyd's Church, in Llanrhystud.
