= Medwyn Williams =

Medwyn Williams MBE FNVS is a Welsh vegetable gardener, 13 times winner of the gold medal at the Chelsea Flower Show.

Born Richard Medwyn Williams in the village of Paradwys, the son of a farm worker and his family moved to Llangristiolus when he was a year old. Aged 8, his father helped him grow radish, mustard and cress in a one-yard plot. After this he helped his father grow various vegetables for garden shows in the Isle of Anglesey, where his father was known for growing long carrots.

Williams became a council official, and in his late 20s entered a "six of a kind" novice class at the Anglesey County Show in 1969. He then joined the National Vegetable Society at the Shrewsbury Flower Show, which led to his competing at most of the National Vegetable Society Championships. Invited by the Chief Executive of the Royal Welsh Show to stage a 15 ft exhibit there, Williams and his father won the large gold medal six years in a row.

After presenting for S4C at the Chelsea Flower Show, Williams decided that he wanted to show at Chelsea. Having to prove himself to the Royal Horticultural Society as being of sufficient quality, he was asked to stage his first RHS exhibit at the Hampton Court Palace Flower Show. Williams and his father won a gold medal on their first attempt, a cut glass vase for the best new competitor, and the Tudor Rose Award which is presented annually to the RHS by the Guild of embroiderers at Hampton Court Palace for the best display at Hampton Court.

Asked the following year, 1996, to exhibit at the Chelsea Flower Show, he grew his exhibits in the research establishment of the University of Wales, Bangor at Penyffridd, where he rents an 80 ft x 60 ft heated greenhouse, a totally cold 120 x 70 ft one, and has use of a small cold store to hold some vegetables back. Williams won 10 consecutive annual Gold medals at Chelsea, an accomplishment that had never been done before with vegetables. He won the President’s Award, 9 Gordon Lennox Trophies for the best vegetable of the year, and 2 Lawrence medals for the Best Horticultural display of the year.

After retiring from competition in 2005 to concentrate on his developing seed business, Williams has displayed internationally, including in Cincinnati, Ohio in April 2006, and lectured, including in Seattle. After his son and grandson joined the seed business in 2009, Williams displayed at the 2010 Chelsea Flower Show, again winning the President’s Award.
