= Henry Maurice (theologian) =

Welsh clergyman

Henry Maurice (c. 1647 – 30 October 1691) was a Welsh clergyman who became Lady Margaret Professor of Divinity at Oxford University.

== Life ==
Maurice, the son of Thomas Maurice, curate of the parish of Llangristiolus, Anglesey, was educated at Beaumaris Grammar School. He then matriculated at Jesus College, Oxford in 1664 at the age of 16, graduating with a B.A. degree in 1668. His ability led to Leoline Jenkins, the college principal, taking an interest in him, and Maurice was elected to a fellowship in 1670 (a position he retained until 1685). He obtained further degrees: M.A. (1671), B.D. (1679) and D.D. (1683). After his ordination, he became curate of Cheltenham after 1669, returning to the college in 1671 only to leave in 1673 to accompany Jenkins as his chaplain to the Congress of Cologne, where Jenkins was an English representative in attempts to settle the Third Anglo-Dutch War. Maurice gained skills in modern languages on this mission and at later negotiations with Jenkins at Nijmegen.

In 1680, William Lloyd, Bishop of St Asaph, helped Maurice to be appointed domestic chaplain to William Sancroft, Archbishop of Canterbury (a position that Maurice held until 1691). During this period, he became Treasurer of Chichester Cathedral, rector of Chevening, Kent, and sinecure rector of Llandrillo-yn-Rhos, Denbighshire. He also became rector of Newington, Oxfordshire. He also wrote and preached extensively. On 18 July 1691, Maurice was elected Lady Margaret Professor of Divinity (by only six votes) and was appointed to the accompanying prebend of Worcester Cathedral. He died suddenly shortly afterwards, on 30 October 1691, and was buried in the chancel of the church at Newington. He left his library to Jesus College.
