= List of SSSIs in West Gwynedd =

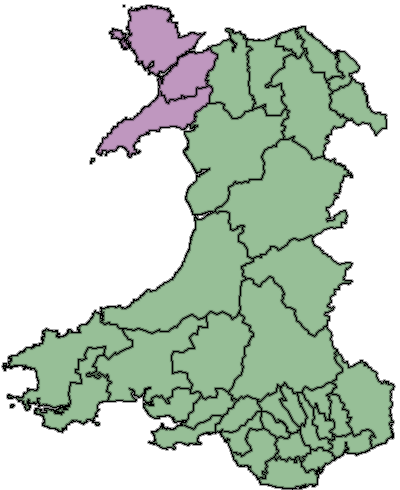
West Gwynedd AOS

Lists of Sites of Special Scientific Interest in West Gwynedd (1974–1996) comprise:

- List of Sites of Special Scientific Interest in Anglesey
- List of Sites of Special Scientific Interest in Gwynedd
