= Cristiolus =

6th-century Welsh saint

Saint Cristiolus
- Honored in: Eastern Orthodox Church
- Feast: 3 November

Cristiolus was a Welsh saint who lived in the 6th century.

== Biography ==
According to tradition, he was a son of Hywel, son of Emyr Llydaw and therefore brother to Saint Sulien, Saint Rhystud and Derfel Gadarn, and perhaps also Dwywe (or Dwywau).

He founded churches, including one at Anglesey.

== Veneration ==
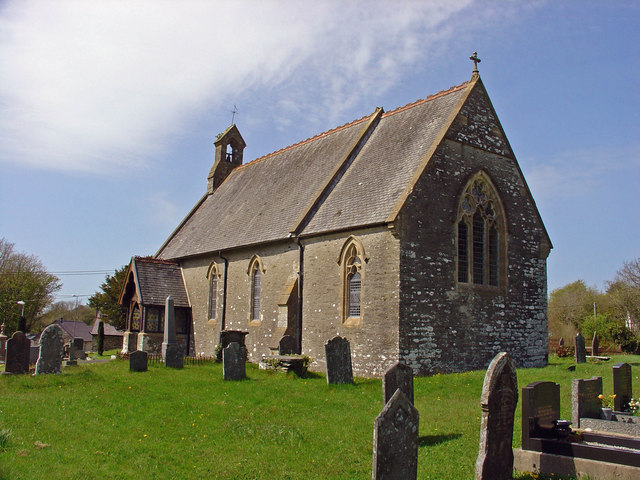
St Cristiolus Church in Eglwyswrw

Cristiolus is venerated in the Eastern Orthodox Church. He is commemorated on 3 November.

There are churches dedicated to Cristiolus at Llangristiolus, Anglesey, together with Eglwyswrw and Penrhydd (Pembrokeshire).
