= Rhuallt =

Village in Denbighshire, Wales

Coordinates: 53.264°N 3.389°W

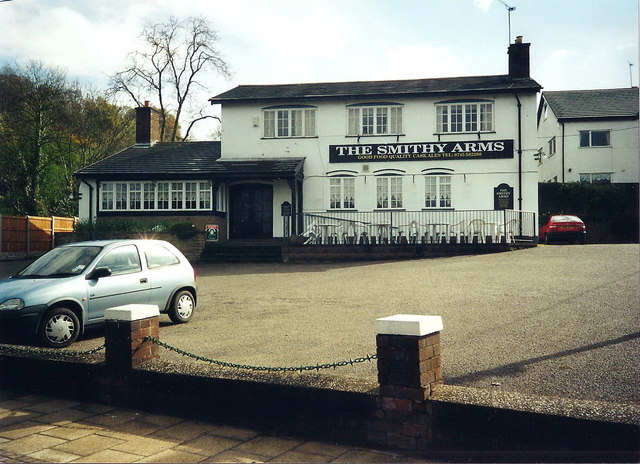
- The Smithy Arms public house, Rhuallt, in 2000 (closed 2014)

- Location within Denbighshire
- OS grid reference: SJ073750
- Community: Tremeirchion
- Principal area: Denbighshire
- Country: Wales
- Sovereign state: United Kingdom
- Post town: ST. ASAPH
- Postcode district: LL17
- Dialling code: 01745
- Police: North Wales
- Fire: North Wales
- Ambulance: Welsh
- UK Parliament: Clwyd East
- Senedd Cymru – Welsh Parliament: Vale of Clwyd

Rhuallt is a village in Denbighshire, Wales, 5 mi (8.0 km) south of Prestatyn and 2 mi (3.2 km) east of St Asaph on the B5429 road. There is one pub, The White House. Rhuallt is mostly in the community of Tremeirchion, with some outlying parts in Cwm.
