= Pensarn =

Suburb of Abergele, north Wales

Coordinates: 53.293°N 3.577°W

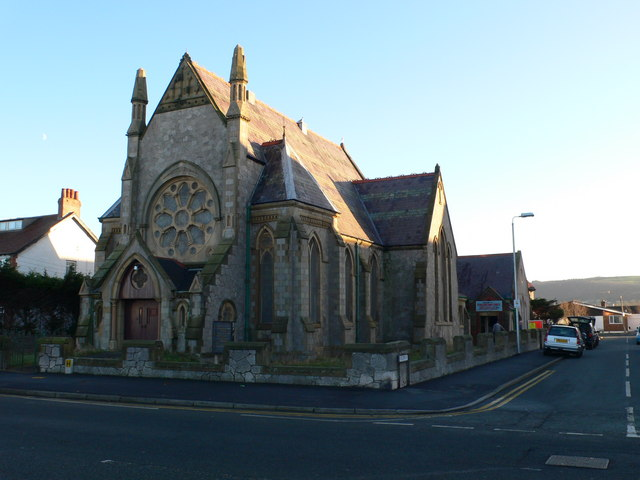
- Pensarn Family Church

- Location within Conwy
- OS grid reference: SH948785
- Community: Abergele
- Principal area: Conwy
- Country: Wales
- Sovereign state: United Kingdom
- Post town: ABERGELE
- Postcode district: LL22
- Dialling code: 01745
- Police: North Wales
- Fire: North Wales
- Ambulance: Welsh
- UK Parliament: Clwyd North
- Senedd Cymru – Welsh Parliament: Clwyd West

Pensarn is a suburb of Abergele, in Conwy County Borough, on the coast of north Wales. The name Pensarn means 'end of the causeway'. The crossing of Morfa Rhuddlan was facilitated by a causeway near the sea at this location.

This causeway was later developed by holiday developments along the coast between Rhyl and Abergele.

Pensarn is served by Abergele & Pensarn railway station, the A55 road and National Cycle Route 5.
