= Tremeirchion =

Village in Denbighshire, Wales

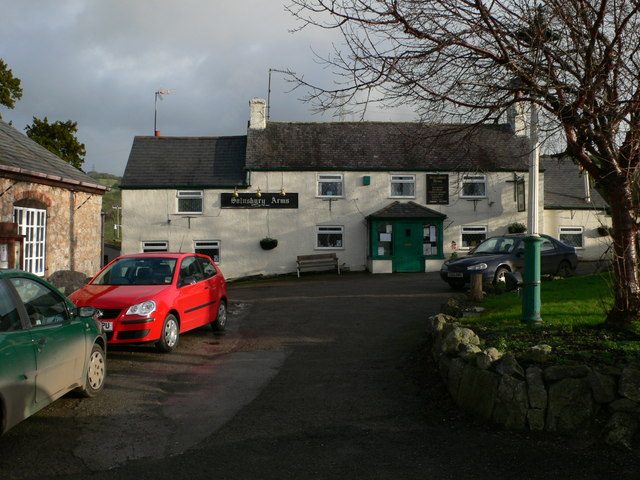
- The Salusbury Arms public house, Tremeirchion

- Location within Denbighshire
- Population: 703 (Parish); 1,649 (Ward) (2011 Census)
- OS grid reference: SJ081729
  - Cardiff: 121 mi (195 km)
  - London: 178 mi (286 km)
- Community: Tremeirchion
- Principal area: Denbighshire
- Preserved county: Clwyd
- Country: Wales
- Sovereign state: United Kingdom
- Post town: ST. ASAPH
- Postcode district: LL17
- Dialling code: 01745
- Police: North Wales
- Fire: North Wales
- Ambulance: Welsh
- UK Parliament: Vale of Clwyd
- Senedd Cymru – Welsh Parliament: Vale of Clwyd
- List of places UK Wales Denbighshire 53.245°N 3.377°W Map of the community

Tremeirchion (previously known as Lleweni) is a small residential community in Denbighshire, Wales. It lies on the B5429 road, to the north east of Denbigh and to the east of St Asaph. The community includes the village of Rhuallt.

The town was part of the traditional lands of the Salusbury family and the Cotton baronets. It was dominated by these two families until the early part of the 20th century. It briefly became well known during the fin de siècle after a series of dinosaur bones were found in the area.

== Demographics ==
In the 2001 Census, Tremeirchion Ward had a population of 1,589 people, although the civil parish figure for the community was 636. These figures changed at the 2011 census to :Ward population 1,649: Community population= 703 Residents in this community had a median household income of £32,400 as of 2006, and 8.9% of residents claimed some sort of disability payment from the government. The population from the 2011 census for the community was 703, with 59.6% born in Wales. 32% of the population could speak Welsh - a small increase from the 31% recorded in the 2001 census, but a decrease from the 37% recorded in the 1991 figures.

== Education ==
The community is served by a small Welsh medium primary school, Ysgol Tremeirchion. According to the latest Estyn inspection report in 2018, there are 73 pupils between three and eleven years old on roll, including 12 part-time nursery age children. 66% of pupils came from homes where Welsh is spoken.

The majority of secondary school students attend classes in larger regional schools located in St Asaph or Denbigh.

Tremeirchion is also home to St Beuno's College, a Jesuit college at which the Victorian era poet and Jesuit priest Gerard Manley Hopkins studied. It now runs spiritual retreats.

== History ==
The local church is the Church of Corpus Christi. The first recorded vicar, in 1350, was Dafydd Ddu Hiraddug. Cyril Williams was appointed vicar in 1951. The celebrated Mrs Thrale is buried there.

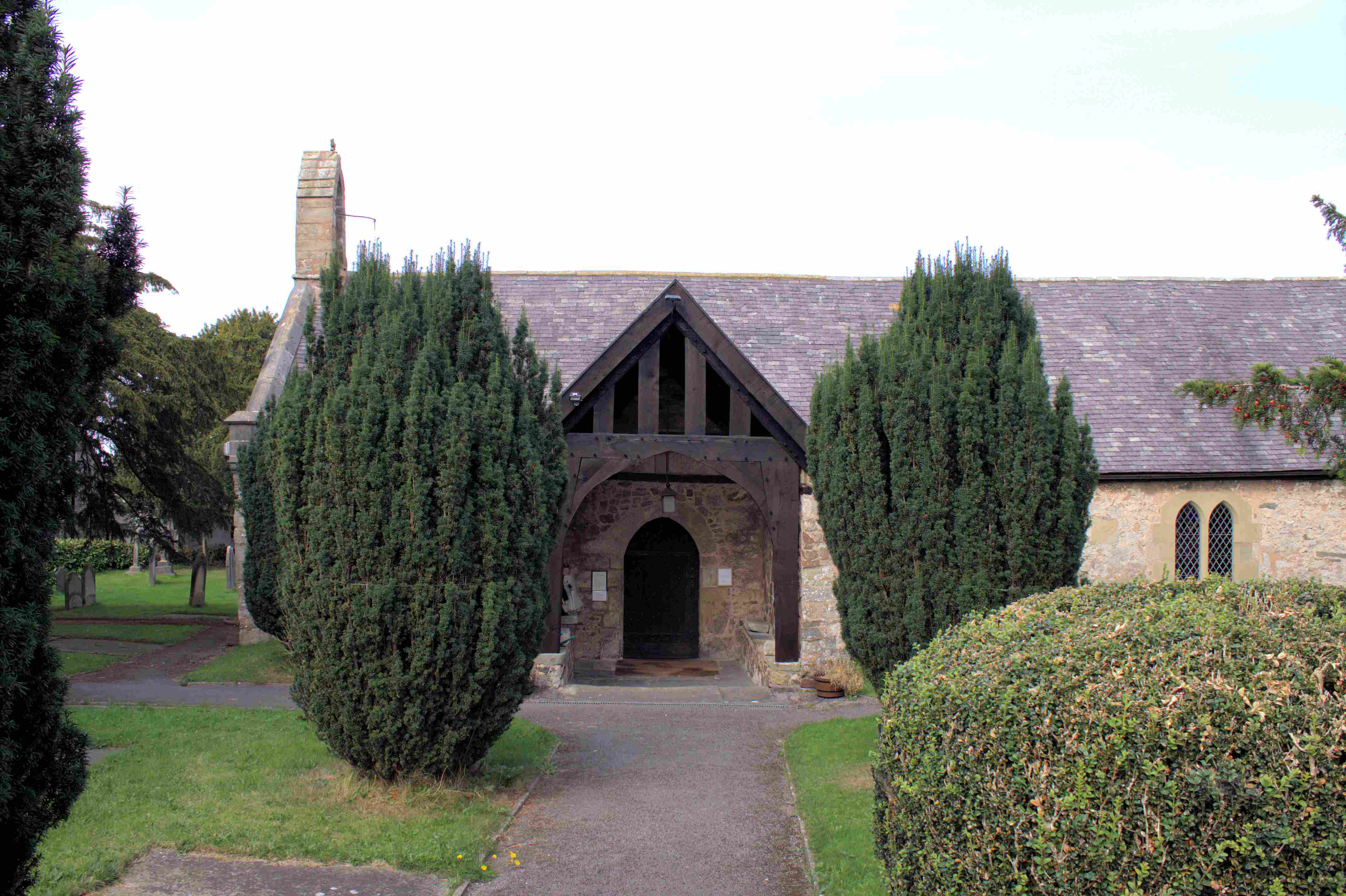
Church of Corpus Christi

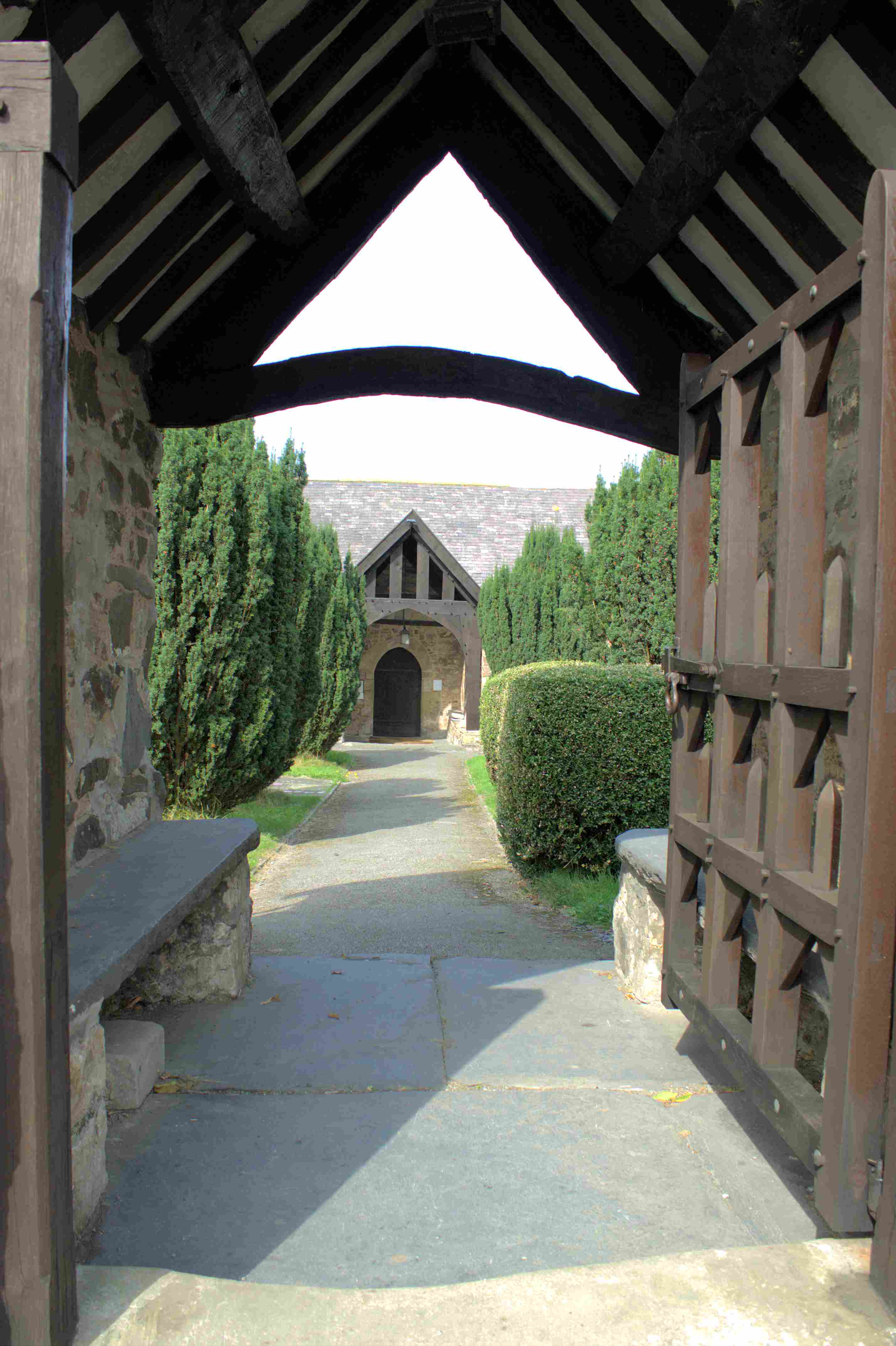

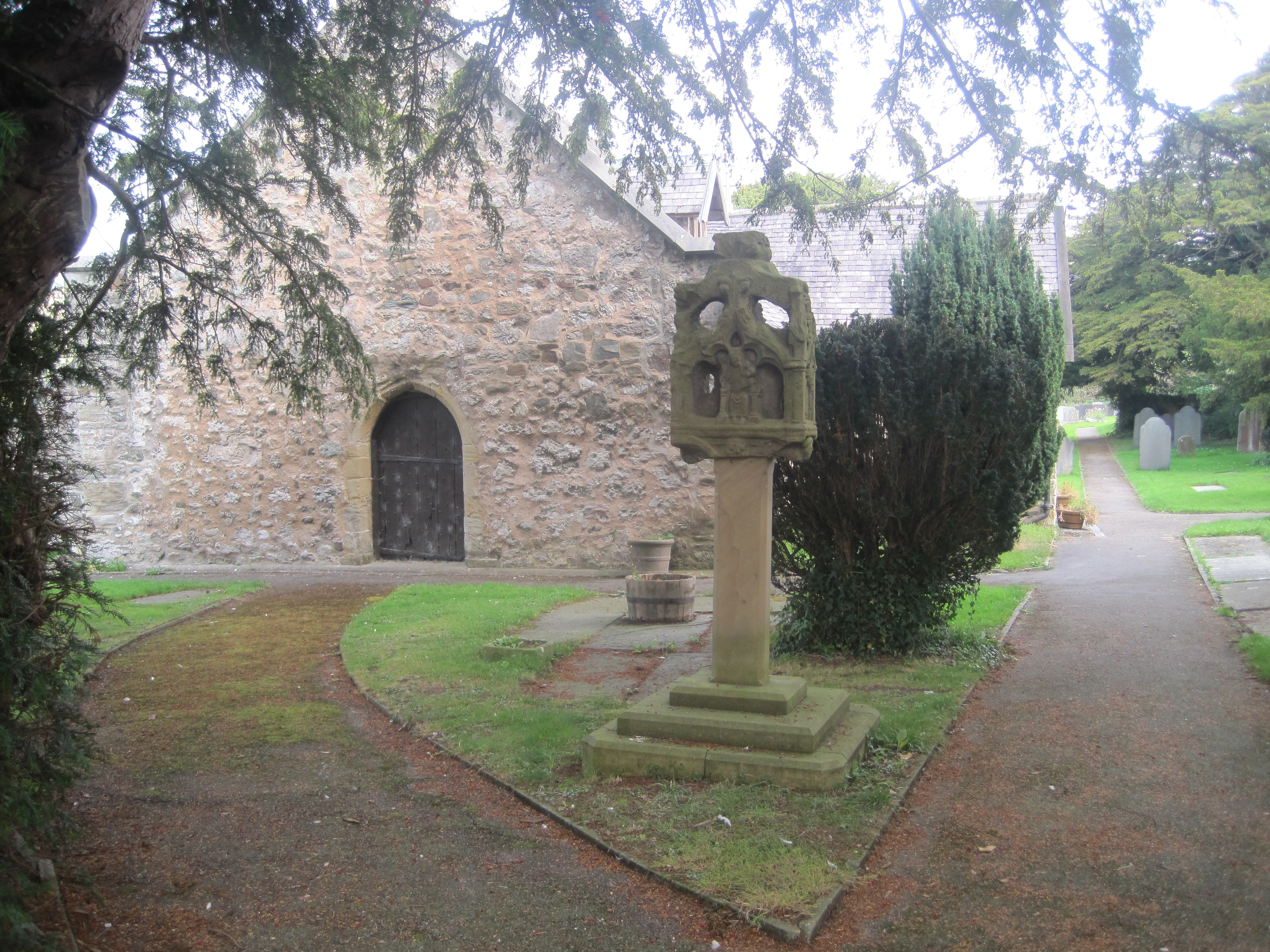
14th-century Celtic Cross

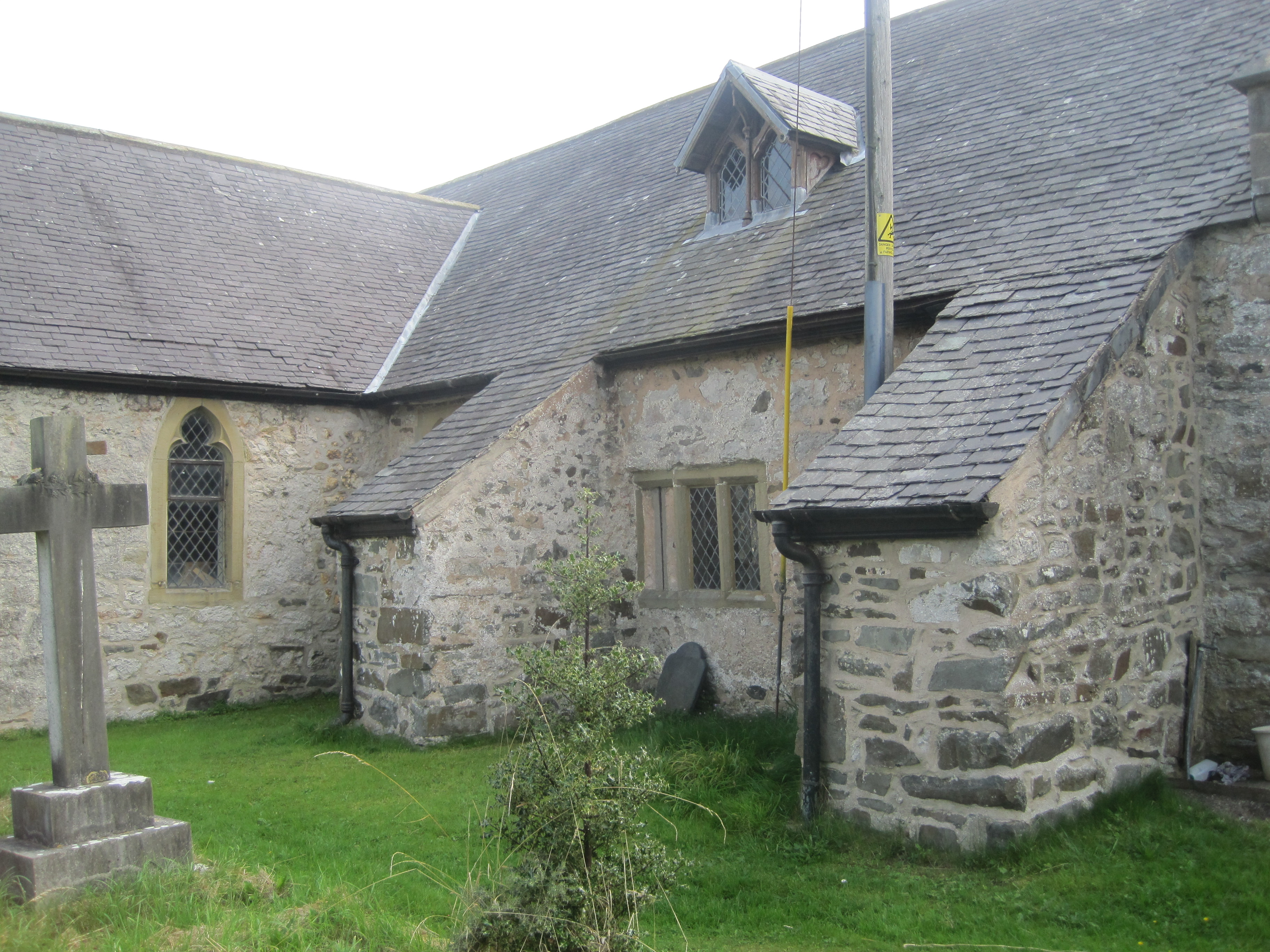

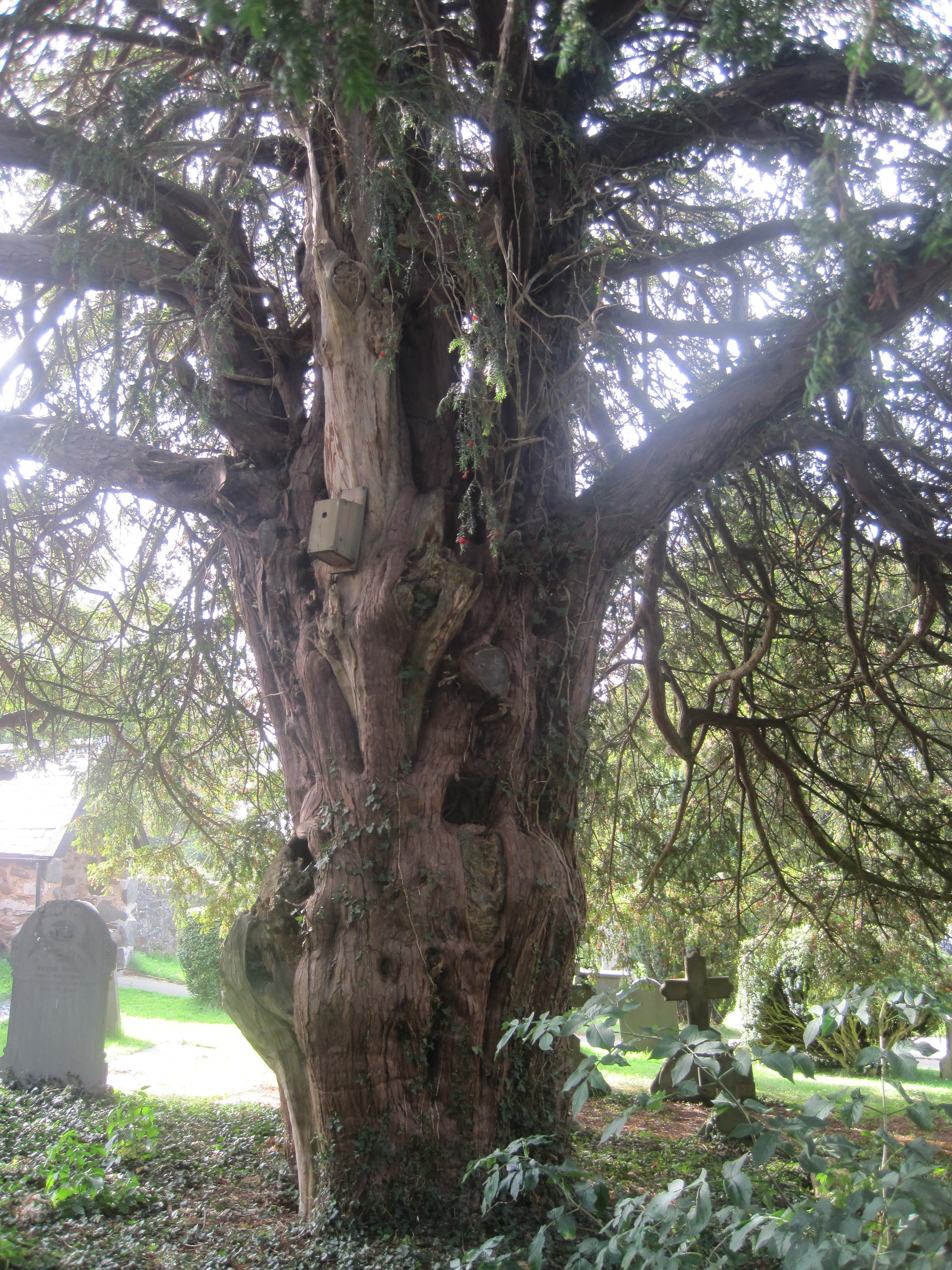
800-year-old yew tree

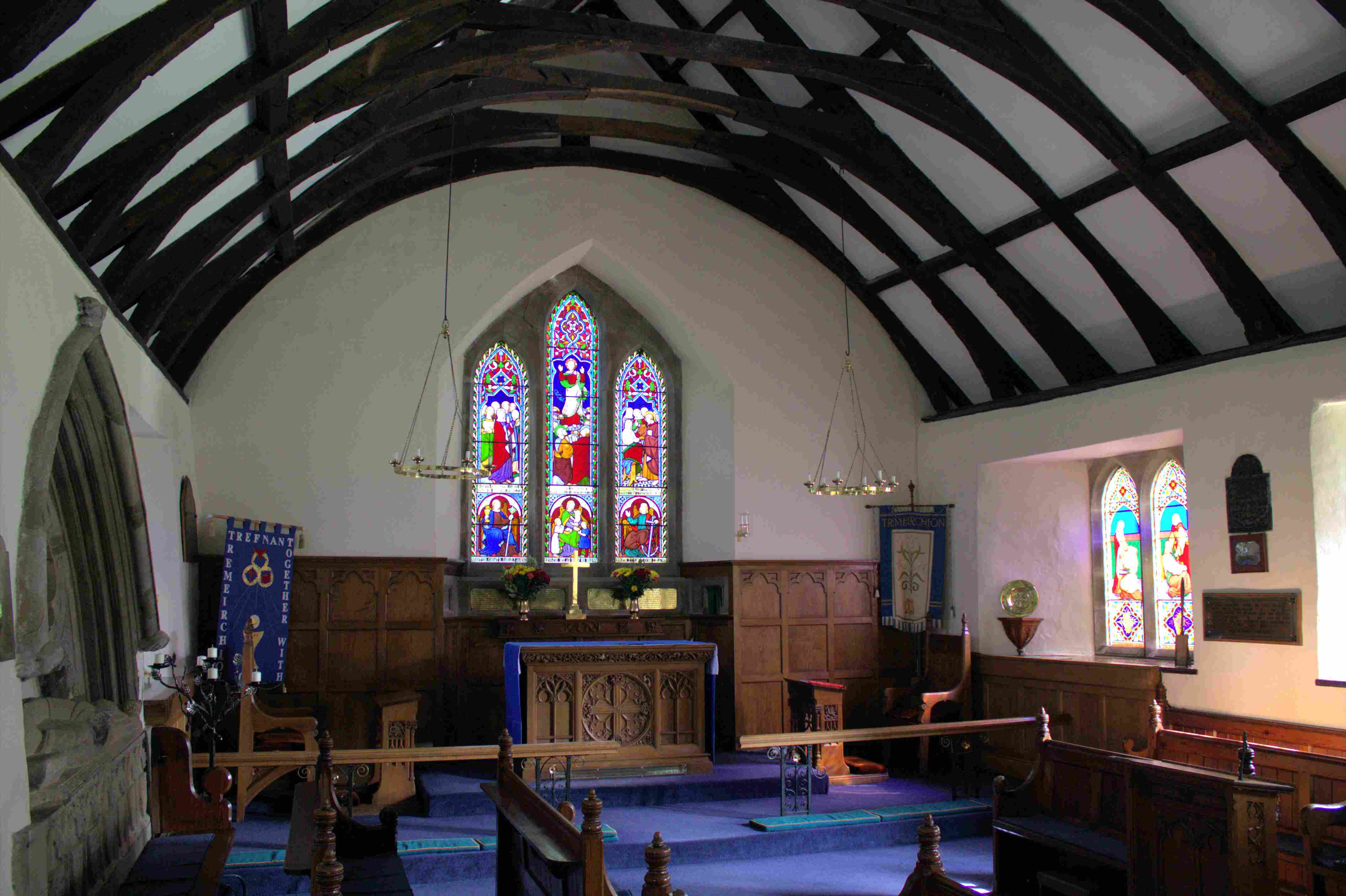

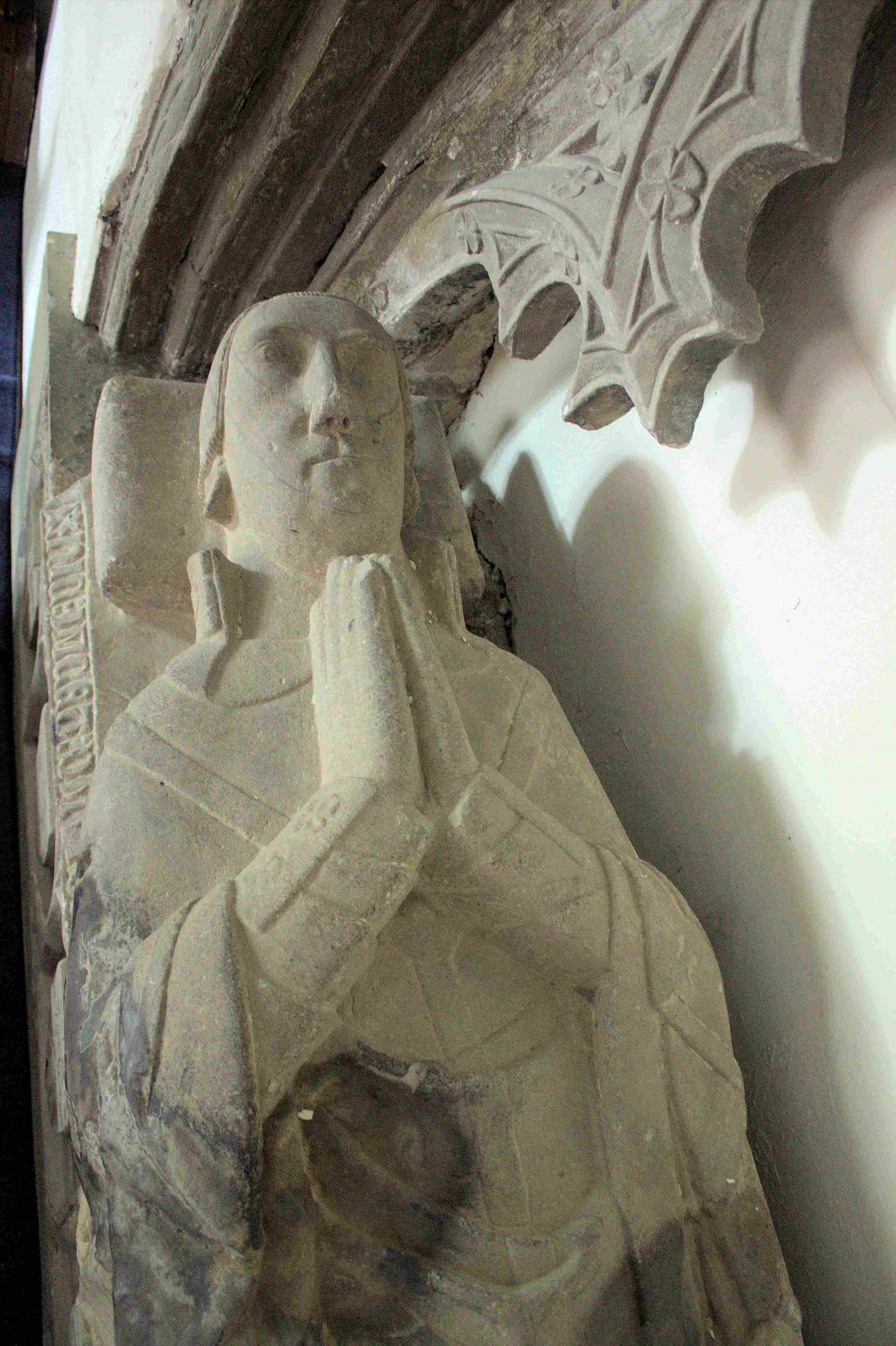
Dafydd ap Hywel ap Madog, Welsh language poet.

== See also ==
- Ffynnon Beuno and Cae Gwyn Caves
