= Midewin =

Midewin may refer to:

- Midewin National Tallgrass Prairie, a grassland preserve in Illinois, USA (name based on alternate spelling of Midewiwin).
- Midewiwin, an aboriginal North American religion/society
