= Rhostrehwfa =

Village in Anglesey, Wales

Coordinates: 53.246668°N 4.340498°W

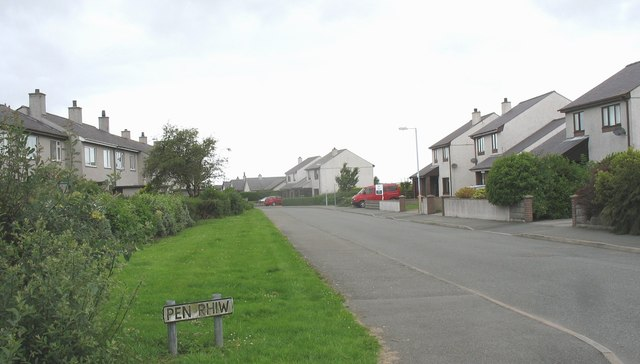

- Location within Anglesey
- Principal area: Anglesey
- Preserved county: Gwynedd
- Country: Wales
- Sovereign state: United Kingdom
- Post town: LLANGEFNI
- Postcode district: LL77
- Police: North Wales
- Fire: North Wales
- Ambulance: Welsh

Rhostrehwfa is a village in southern-central Anglesey, located southwest of Llangefni. To the southeast is the Malltraeth Marsh. It is situated at a prominent point on the crest of a ridge overlooking the River Cefni valley to the south. It contains the Capel Pisgah and several holiday cottages. It is in the community of Llangristiolus and the Bodffordd electoral ward.

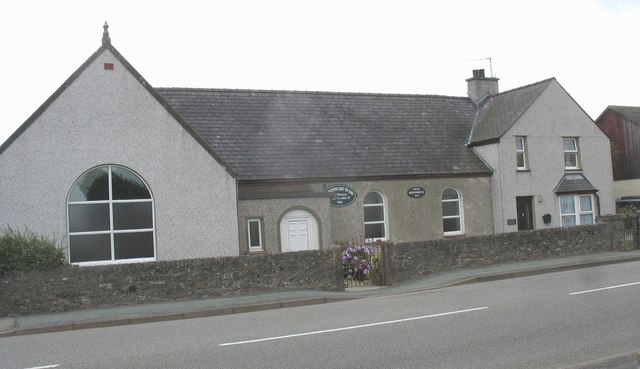
Capel Pisgah (Baptist)

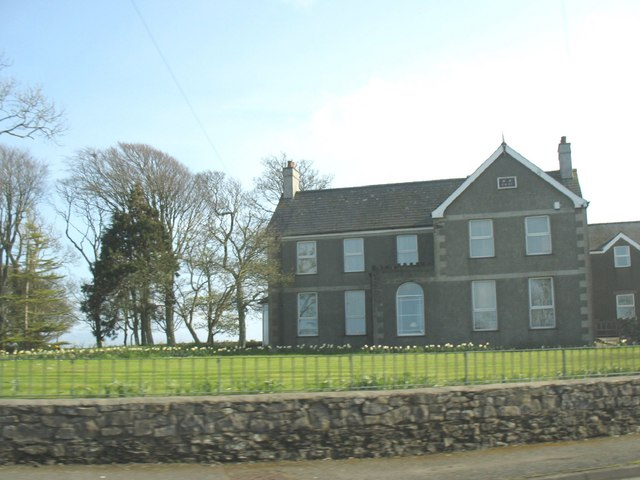
Cefncwmwd, Rhostrehwfa
