= In the Nursery =

English band

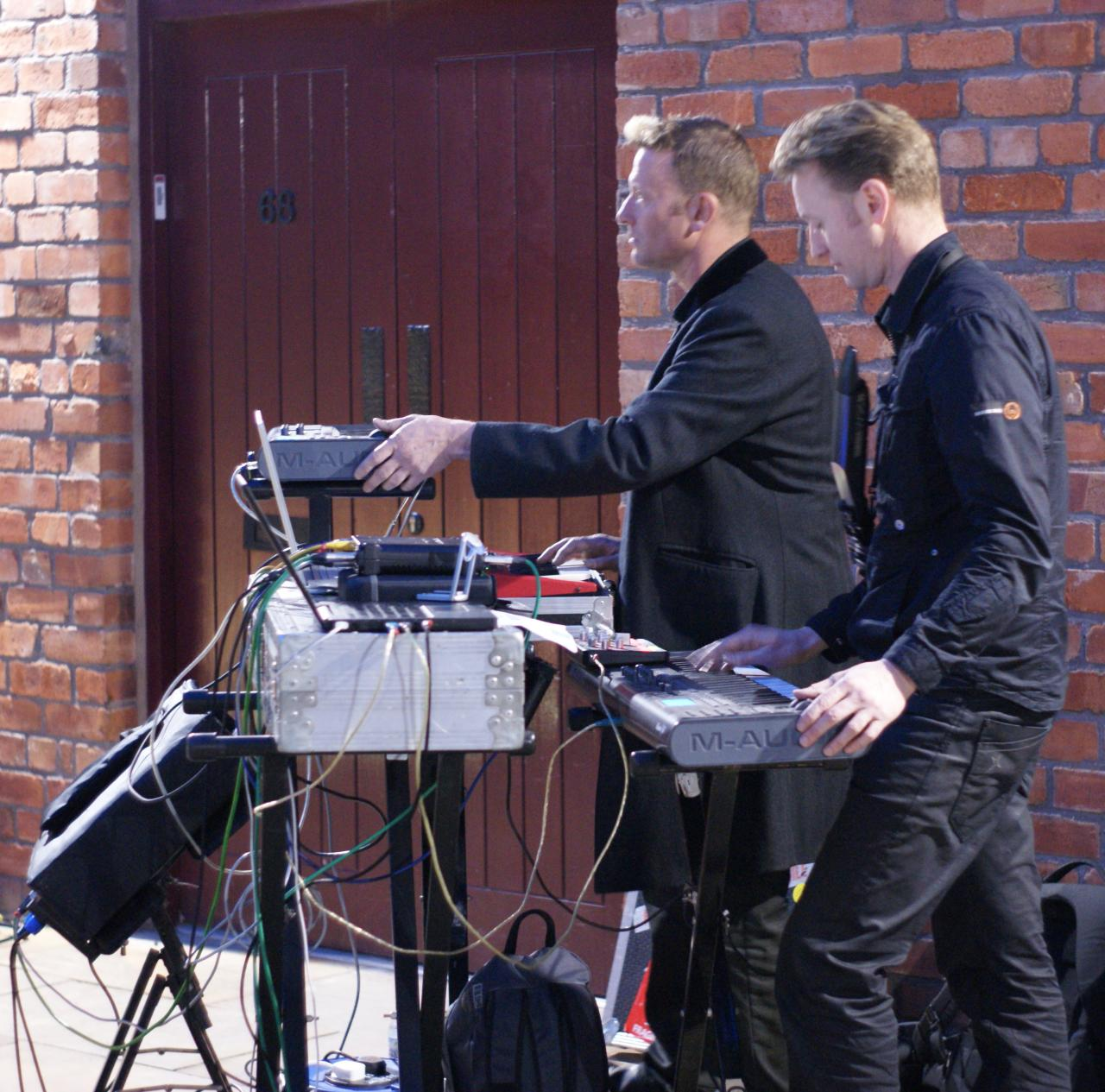
- In the Nursery, 2009

Background information
- Origin: Sheffield, England
- Genres: Neoclassical dark wave; martial industrial; electronic
- Years active: 1981–present
- Labels: ITN Corporation; Third Mind; Wax Trax!; TVT
- Members: Klive Humberstone; Nigel Humberstone; Dolores Marguerite C
- Past members: Anthony Bennett; Q
- Website: inthenursery.com

In the Nursery are an English neoclassical dark wave band, characterized by their cinematic sound. The duo has provided soundtracks to a variety of TV programmes and films, and is known for its rescoring of silent films.

== History ==
Twin brothers Klive and Nigel Humberstone were brought up in a small village west of London. After completing secondary school, the twins relocated to Sheffield where they went to separate college campuses. By 1981 they had joined with guitar player Anthony Bennett to form In the Nursery.

Influenced by the rock band Joy Division, the trio emerged alongside the UK's industrial music scene. In June 1983 the band released the six-track When Cherished Dreams Come True followed by the "Witness (To a Scream)" single, both on Paragon Records, and the Sonority EP on New European Recordings.

In 1985 the band moved to the Sweatbox label, releasing the Temper EP. Temper displayed a heavily industrial influenced sound, replete with screamed and shouted lyrics, grinding metal sounds, and metal percussion.

The full-length Twins was recorded at Bradford's Flexible Response Studio without Bennett, who left the band in 1985. Multi-lingual vocalist Dolores Marguerite C made her debut on the Trinity EP adding French narration to "Elegy'. The piece took as its subject torture that occurred during the Algerian War which the band thought was most appropriately treated in French.

Dolores and marching-styled percussionist Q — a college friend of Klive's — were added to the line-up on the subsequent Stormhorse, the soundtrack to an imaginary film that provided the cinematic blueprint for all their future recordings. The quartet's final recording for Sweatbox, 1988's Köda, completed the transition to a classical instrumental sound and utilised computer sequencing in the recording process for the first time. Köda was the band's first licensed work with Wax Trax! Records in the US which lead to greater exposure and an increased fan base.

Following the collapse of Sweatbox, the band moved to Third Mind Records to complete the album L'Esprit. The album was recorded with engineer Steve Harris who had contributed to Köda and would feature on all the band's subsequent releases. Sense and Duality were followed by a logical progression to real soundtrack work on 1993's psychological drama An Ambush of Ghosts. Their music has also featured in Interview with the Vampire, Street Fighter II: The Animated Movie, and The Rainmaker. In the mid 90s the band was commissioned, as part of the Optical Music Series, to provide new scores for the silent classics The Cabinet of Dr. Caligari, Asphalt, and Man with a Movie Camera. Anatomy of a Poet, a concept album about the creative psyche, featured author Colin Wilson reciting romantic poetry against a lush backdrop of strings, and also included a cover version of Scott Walker's "Seventh Seal".

A retrospective compilation (Scatter) of their work was the first release on their own ITN Corporation label. Further concept albums have included Deco (inspired by the Art Deco movement) and the ambitious Lingua, an exploration of language featuring vocal contributions from around the world. The Humberstones also record more dance-oriented material under the Les Jumeaux moniker, and as such were involved in pre-production work on Sabres of Paradise's classic techno anthem "Smokebelch".

The 2011 release Blind Sound was a more consistently dark album from the Humberstone brothers and featured more real percussion than previous releases. In 2011, "White Robe" from An Ambush of Ghosts was used on a trailer for Game of Thrones.

A remix by In the Nursery of the Sabres of Paradise instrumental track "Haunted Dancehall" was included in the latter band's 1995 Versus album. The remix was part of BBC Radio 1's playlist following the death of Princess Diana on 31 August 1997, and in 2011 it was described by the then-head of Radio 1, Christopher Price, as the style of music that would be played on pop radio to prepare audiences for an announcement of similarly tragic news such as the death of Elizabeth II. In the event, however, neither the original "Haunted Dancehall" track nor the In the Nursery remix are known to have been played at any point during the day of Elizabeth II's death on 8 September 2022.

In 2014, members of In the Nursery and fellow Sheffield band Clock DVA joined former Cabaret Voltaire vocalist Stephen Mallinder in a performance under the name IBBERSON. The performance took place at the newly built John Pemberton Lecture Theatres in the School of Health and Related Research at the University of Sheffield, which was constructed in the approximate location of the original Western Works studio which was a central hub for the bands in the early eighties. The name "IBBERSON" is a reference to a sign which used to hang outside the studio building.

== Discography ==
=== Albums ===
- When Cherished Dreams Come True (1983, mini-album)
- Sonority (1985, EP)
- Temper (1985, EP)
- Twins (1986)
- Trinity (1987, EP)
- Stormhorse (1987)
- Compulsion (1988, EP)
- Prelude 1983–1985 (1988)
- Köda (1988)
- Counterpoint (1989)
- L'esprit (1990)
- Sesudient (1990, EP)
- Sense (1991)
- Duality (1992)
- An Ambush of Ghosts (1993, soundtrack)
- Anatomy of a Poet (1994)
- Scatter (1995)
- Deco (1996)
- The Cabinet of Dr Caligari (1996, soundtrack)
- Asphalt (1997, soundtrack)
- Lingua (1998)
- Man with a Movie Camera (1999, soundtrack)
- Groundloop (2000)
- Exhibit (2000)
- Hindle Wakes (2001, soundtrack)
- Engel (2001)
- Praxis (2003)
- A Page of Madness (2004, soundtrack)
- Electric Edwardians (2005, soundtrack)
- Era (2007)
- The Passion of Joan of Arc (2008, soundtrack)
- Aubade (2010, a collection of recordings from 1983 to 1985)
- Blind Sound (2011)
- The Calling (2013)
- The Fall of the House of Usher (2015, soundtrack)
- 1961 (2017)
- The Seashell and the Clergyman (2019, soundtrack)
- H U M B E R S T O N E (2022)
