= L'esprit =

Studio album by In the Nursery
- Released: April 1990
- Recorded: Slaughterhouse Recording Studios, Great Driffield, East Yorkshire
- Genre: Neoclassical Dark Wave, Martial industrial
- Length: 43:29
- Label: Wax Trax!/TVT; Third Mind
- Producer: Steve Harris, In the Nursery

In the Nursery chronology
Prelude 1983–1985 (1989)	L'esprit (1990)	Sense (1991)

Professional ratings
Review scores
Source	Rating
Allmusic	4.5/5 stars
Alternative Press	Positive

L'esprit is the fourth album by In the Nursery, released in 1990 through Wax Trax! Records.

== Reception ==
Mike Shea at Alternative Press remarked that with L'esprit the band successfully improved on the soundtrack-oriented approach of their previous album, Köda, and that "never before has music been able to move me to tears and rip up bad childhood memories."

== Track listing ==
All tracks are written by Klive Humberstone and Nigel Humberstone.

No.	Title	Length
1.	"To the Faithful"	4:46
2.	"At First Sight"	4:46
3.	"Sesudient"	4:20
4.	"Azure Wings"	3:03
5.	"Sœurette"	3:28
6.	"Inamorata"	0:54
7.	"Retaliation"	4:42
8.	"Träumerei"	3:51
9.	"Scenes of Childhood"	4:48
10.	"The Pearl"	5:01
11.	"L'esprit"	3:46

CD bonus tracks (The Compulsion 12")
No.	Title	Length
12.	"Reverie"	1:46
13.	"Alluvion"	4:53
14.	"Across the Ruins"	4:01
15.	"To the Faithful (Reprise)"	2:21

1999 CD re-issue bonus tracks
No.	Title	Length
16.	"Archaic Torso"	3:05
17.	"Blade"	3:37
18.	"Incidental Guilt"	3:42

== Personnel ==
In the Nursery

- Klive Humberstone – instruments
- Nigel Humberstone – instruments
- Q. – percussion
- Dolores Marguerite C – narration

Production and additional personnel

- Chris Bigg – design
- Ruth Chappell – photography
- Steve Harris – production
- In the Nursery – production
- Bill Stephenson – photography
