= The Sabres of Paradise =

British electronic music group

- Origin: London, England
- Genre: Electronic
- Years active: 1992–1995; 2024–present
- Labels: Warp; Sabres of Paradise; Fontana; Special Emissions; Elastic Dreams
- Members: Jagz Kooner; Gary Burns
- Past members: Andrew Weatherall

The Sabres of Paradise are a British electronic music group from London. The group consists of Jagz Kooner and Gary Burns, and formerly Andrew Weatherall.

== History ==
The Sabres of Paradise were formed in London, England in 1992. Andrew Weatherall formed the group with engineers Jagz Kooner and Gary Burns and became responsible for the Sabresonic warehouse raves. The group's debut studio album, Sabresonic, was released in 1993. It peaked at number 29 on the UK Albums Chart. NME named it the 23rd best album of 1993. The group released Haunted Dancehall in 1994. It peaked at number 57 on the UK Albums Chart. NME named it the 47th best album of 1994. It was included on the list of 1001 Albums You Must Hear Before You Die. The group released Sabresonic II in 1995. It peaked at number 88 on the UK Albums Chart.

The group dissolved in 1995. Weatherall went on to form Two Lone Swordsmen with Keith Tenniswood while Kooner and Burns carried on working together with The Aloof.

Weatherall died in 2020. At his funeral, Kooner and Burns met for the first time in years and started to get in touch more. In October 2024, The Sabres of Paradise announced that they would reunite to play at Fabric London in May 2025, warming up to their official reunion tour beginning with Vivid Live in Sydney on the 1st of June.

== Style and influences ==
In 2011, the then-head of music at BBC Radio 1, Christopher Price, highlighted the In the Nursery remix of "Haunted Dancehall" as the style of music that would be played on pop radio to prepare audiences before cutting to an announcement of major news such as the death of the Queen.

== Members ==
=== Current members ===
- Jagz Kooner – production, mixing, instruments (1992–1995, 2024–present)
- Gary Burns – production, mixing, instruments (1992–1995, 2024–present)

=== Former members ===
- Andrew Weatherall – production, mixing, instruments (1992–1995, died 2020)

=== Touring members ===
- Nick Abnett – bass (1992–1995, 2025–present)
- Richard Thair - drums, percussion (1992–1994, 2025–present)
- Chris Mackin - guitar (2026–present)

=== Former touring members ===
- Phil Mossman – guitar (1992–1995, 2025–2026)
- Keith Tenniswood – guitar (1995)
- Jim Carmichael – drums, percussion (1995)

== Discography ==
=== Studio albums ===
- Sabresonic (Warp, 1993)
- Haunted Dancehall (Warp, 1994)
- Sabresonic II (Warp, 1995)

=== Compilation albums ===
- Septic Cuts (Sabres of Paradise, 1994)
- Deep Cuts (Sabres of Paradise, 1994)
- Versus (Warp, 1995)

=== Singles ===
- "Smokebelch II" (Warp, 1993)
- "United" (Sabres of Paradise, 1993)
- "Theme" (Sabres of Paradise, 1994)
- "Wilmot" (Warp, 1994)
- "Wilmot II" (Warp, 1994)
- "Jam J" (Fontana Records, 1994) (with James)
- "Haunted Dancehall (As Performed by In the Nursery)" (Warp, 1995)
- "Duke of Earlsfield (LFO Mix)" / "Bubble & Slide (Nightmares on Wax Mix)" (Warp, 1995)
- "Tow Truck (Chemical Brothers Mix)" / "Tow Truck (Depth Charge Mix)" (Warp, 1995)
- "Ysaebud" (Special Emissions, 1997)
- "Lick Wid Nit Wit" (Elastic Dreams, 2018)

=== Remixes ===
- Mad Monks on Zinc (The Sabres Of Paradise Mix) - Holy Ghost Inc. {1992}
- I Want You (Sabres 130) - Utah Saints {1992}
- Be Still (Sabres Of Paradise Remix) - Peace Together {1993}
- 1 2 3 - Sabres of Paradise Mix - K-Klass {1993}
- Everything (Everything Grooves Part 1) - Stereo MCs {1993}
- One Day (Endorphin Mix), Come to Me (Sabres of Paradise Mix), One Day (Springs Eternal Mix) - Bjork {1993}
- Song to the Siren (Sabre of Paradise 100% chunk Mix) -- Dust Brothers {1993}
- Bonita Mañana [Sabres of Paradise remix] -- Espiritu {1994}
- Jailbird (Sweeney 2 Sabres Mix) -- Primal Scream {1994}
- 11 Years (Sabres Of Paradise Main Mix) -- Wolfgang Press {1994}
- Nowhere (Sabres Of Paradise Remix) -- Therapy? {1994}
- Indigo (Sabres Of Paradise Remix) - Skylab {1995}
- Leave Home (Sabres of Paradise mix) - Chemical Brothers {!995}
- Hot Flush (Sabres of Paradise remix) - Red Snapper {1995}
- Mother India (Sabres At Dusk Mix) - Fun 'da' Mental {1995}
