= Counterpoint (In the Nursery album) =

Compilation album by In the Nursery
- Released: April 1989
- Recorded: 1983 – 1986
- Genre: Neoclassical Dark Wave, Martial industrial
- Length: 52:14
- Label: Sweatbox
- Producer: In the Nursery

In the Nursery chronology
Köda (1988)	Counterpoint (1989)	Prelude 1983–1985 (1989)

Professional ratings
Review scores
Source	Rating
Allmusic	4.5/5 stars

Counterpoint is a compilation album by In the Nursery, released in 1989 through Sweatbox Records. It collects tracks from several of their early EPs.

== Track listing ==
All tracks are written by Klive Humberstone and Nigel Humberstone, except "Butyrki" co-written by Ant Bennett

No.	Title	Original album	Length
1.	"Breach Birth"	Temper	6:27
2.	"Compulsion"	Compulsion	4:02
3.	"Workcorps (Fist Style)"	Twins	3:15
4.	"Twins" (Remix)	Twins	4:12
5.	"Iskra"	From Torture to Conscience	3:14
6.	"Arm Me Audacity"	Temper	3:40
7.	"Sentient"	Abstract No. 5	4:06
8.	"Blind Me"	Trinity	4:26
9.	"Libertaire"	Compulsion	3:31
10.	"Elegy"	Trinity	4:58
11.	"Joaquin"	Temper	3:23
12.	"Butyrki"	Temper	2:36
13.	"Breach Birth" (Inception Mix)	Abstract No. 6	4:17

== Personnel ==
In the Nursery

- Klive Humberstone – instruments
- Nigel Humberstone – instruments

Production and additional personnel

- Ant Bennett – instruments on "Butyrki"v
- Chris Bigg – design
- In the Nursery – production
