= Dead air =

Unintended broadcast silence

Dead air, also known in radio as unmodulated carrier, is an unintended period of silence that interrupts a broadcast during which no audio or video program material is transmitted.

== Radio and television ==
Dead air occurs in radio broadcasting when no audio program is transmitted for an extended period of time, usually more than a few seconds. In television broadcasting, the term denotes the absence of both audio and video program material. However, a carrier wave is still transmitting. In radio, the result is silence, and in television, the result is a silent black or gray screen.

Television directors may use the command "fade to black" or "to black" to indicate a momentary transition to a completely black image. However, the term "dead air" is most often used in cases where program material comes to an unexpected halt, either through operator error or technical malfunction. Among professional broadcasters, dead air is considered one of the worst things that can occur. Moreover, dead air may impact advertising revenue if it affects the airplay of paid commercials.

The term "dead air" does not refer to a broadcast transmitter that is intentionally shut down, i.e. "closed", "signed off" or "off the air", by a control operator. Such a broadcast transmitter is said to have gone "dark".

== Broadcast regulations ==
Broadcast stations can use programmable devices known as "silence sensors", "off air alarms" or "silence monitors" that will sound an alarm and alert personnel if dead air persists more than a few seconds.

In the U.S., prolonged dead air, such as a shutdown occurring without permission, is an actionable offense that can result in fines from the Federal Communications Commission (FCC). According to the FCC, a station has a 30-day limit for going silent without approval.

== Examples ==
On September 11, 1987, Dan Rather walked off the set of the CBS Evening News when a late running U.S. Open tennis match threatened to delay the start of his news broadcast. The match then ended sooner than expected but Rather was already gone. The network broadcast six minutes of dead air before Rather was found and returned to the studio. CBS affiliates criticized Rather for the incident.

One significant case of dead air occurred during Super Bowl LII in 2018, when the NBC television broadcast experienced 26 seconds of dead air during a commercial break. The network blamed "a brief equipment failure." NBC reported that no commercial advertising was lost. Prior to Super Bowl XLV, Green Bay, Wisconsin, radio station WCHK-FM announced that it would intentionally go to dead air during the game, since the hometown Packers were playing in the game and station management believed nobody would be listening to music while the Super Bowl was being broadcast on another station.

On 19 May 2026, Radio Caroline experienced dead air after an employee accessed files that activated a routine prepared for the death of Charles III as part of the contingency plan Operation Menai Bridge, causing the station to air a pre-recorded announcement that the King had died, followed by God Save the King. Panicked, the employee stopped the broadcast, but then fled the station; as the presenter on air at the time was working remotely, no one was aware that the station was broadcasting dead air for over sixteen minutes on its DAB service, while the station's AM radio output switched to a backup tape. Following the incident, Ofcom reported that the accidental broadcast of the pre-recorded message had breached its rules on due accuracy, while the employee responsible was reprimanded for their actions.

== Prevention ==
Many broadcasters install a silence detector independently operating from their broadcasting headquarters. In the event of dead air lasting more than an acceptable duration, e.g. ≤ −70 dB and (if applicable) static/no picture for 30 seconds, an emergency program is cued.

The emergency program contains at least some generic audio (and video) with a station identification. Radio stations usually play a loop of music. The playlist is fixed so staff listening to their own station, typically broadcast engineers, can recognize the pattern of titles, infer how long the outage has already (at least) lasted and take action to fix the problem.

Apart from providing a safeguard in the event of unscheduled interruption (like a fire in the building or technical issues), this mechanism may be used deliberately during programmed blackouts caused by strikes of technicians, journalists, and producers. When staff of the French public broadcasting network Radio France went on strike in September 2020, a pretaped message informing listeners that no service is available due to industrial action was inserted into the loop.

== See also ==
- Comfort noise
- Off-the-air
- Radio jamming
- Radio silence
