= Prelude 1983–1985 =

Compilation album by In the Nursery
- Released: May 1989
- Recorded: 1983–1985
- Length: 55:25
- Label: Normal
- Producer: In the Nursery

In the Nursery chronology
| Counterpoint (1989) | Prelude 1983–1985 (1989) | L'esprit (1990) |

Professional ratings
Review scores
| Source | Rating |
|---|---|
| Allmusic | 2.5/5 stars |

Prelude 1983–1985 is a compilation album by English electronic music duo In the Nursery, released in 1989 through Normal Records. It collects tracks from several of their early releases, including two singles and When Cherished Dreams Come True.

== Track listing ==
All tracks are written by Ant Bennett, Klive Humberstone and Nigel Humberstone

| No. | Title | Original album | Length |
|---|---|---|---|
| 1. | "Remain" | When Cherished Dreams Come True | 3:14 |
| 2. | "Stone Souls" | When Cherished Dreams Come True | 3:25 |
| 3. | "Execution's Romance" | When Cherished Dreams Come True | 5:20 |
| 4. | "Patter" | When Cherished Dreams Come True | 4:10 |
| 5. | "A to I" | When Cherished Dreams Come True | 3:33 |
| 6. | "Mystery" | When Cherished Dreams Come True | 4:10 |
| 7. | "Witness (To a Scream)" | Witness (To a Scream) | 4:00 |
| 8. | "E984" | Witness (To a Scream) | 3:30 |
| 9. | "Iskra" | Torture to Conscience | 3:09 |
| 10. | "Sentient" | Torture to Conscience | 4:04 |
| 11. | "Deus Ex Machina" | Sonority | 5:45 |
| 12. | "Lost Prayer" | Sonority | 4:35 |
| 13. | "And Your Eyes" | Sonority | 6:30 |

== Personnel ==
In the Nursery

- Ant Bennett – instruments
- Janet Clarkson – narration
- Klive Humberstone – instruments
- Nigel Humberstone – instruments
- Wilson – narration
