= Stormhorse =

Studio album by In the Nursery
- Released: April 1987
- Recorded: April 1987 at Fon Studios, Sheffield, England
- Genre: Neoclassical Dark Wave, Martial industrial
- Length: 48:28
- Label: Sweatbox
- Producer: In the Nursery, Sebastiane

In the Nursery chronology
Twins (1986)	Stormhorse (1987)	Köda (1988)

Professional ratings
Review scores
Source	Rating
Allmusic	3/5 stars

Stormhorse is the second album by In the Nursery, released in 1987 through Sweatbox Records.

== Track listing ==
All tracks are written by Klive Humberstone and Nigel Humberstone

No.	Title	Length
1.	"Tempest"	2:35
2.	"Subito Regal – Miracle of the Rose I"	6:07
3.	"The Empty Fortress"	2:59
4.	"Hunting Theme"	1:16
5.	"Hit"	2:08
6.	"Portamento"	4:54
7.	"Stormhorse"	2:02
8.	"Nightshade"	3:03
9.	"Leggiero – World of the Newborn"	3:52
10.	"Dolente"	1:20
11.	"Counterpart"	4:24
12.	"Miracle of the Rose II"	2:35

CD bonus tracks (Trinity 12")
No.	Title	Length
13.	"Blind Me"	4:26
14.	"Elegy (Reprise)"	0:09
15.	"Elegy"	6:40

== Personnel ==
In the Nursery

- Klive Humberstone – instruments, vocals
- Nigel Humberstone – instruments, vocals
- Q. – percussion
- Dolores Marguerite C – narration

Production and additional personnel

- Chris Bigg – design
- Jane Cornthwaite – cello on "Miracle of the Rose II"
- In the Nursery – production
- Sebastiane – production
- Bill Stephenson – photography
