= Optical Music Series =

The Optical Music Series is a set of soundtracks by the English Neoclassical duo In The Nursery, released under their own ITN Corporation record label. These soundtrack are meant as companions to several classic silent films of the early 20th century. The series began in 1996 with the release of The Cabinet of Dr. Caligari and includes Carl Theodor Dreyer's The Passion of Joan of Arc and their most recent release, the 2019 soundtrack to The Seashell and the Clergyman.

== List of releases ==
- The Cabinet of Dr. Caligari 1996
- Asphalt 1997
- Man With A Movie Camera 1999
- Hindle Wakes 2001
- A Page of Madness 2004
- Electric Edwardians 2005
- The Passion of Joan of Arc 2008
- The Fall of the House of Usher 2015
- The Seashell and the Clergyman 2019
