= Menai Heritage Bridges Exhibition =

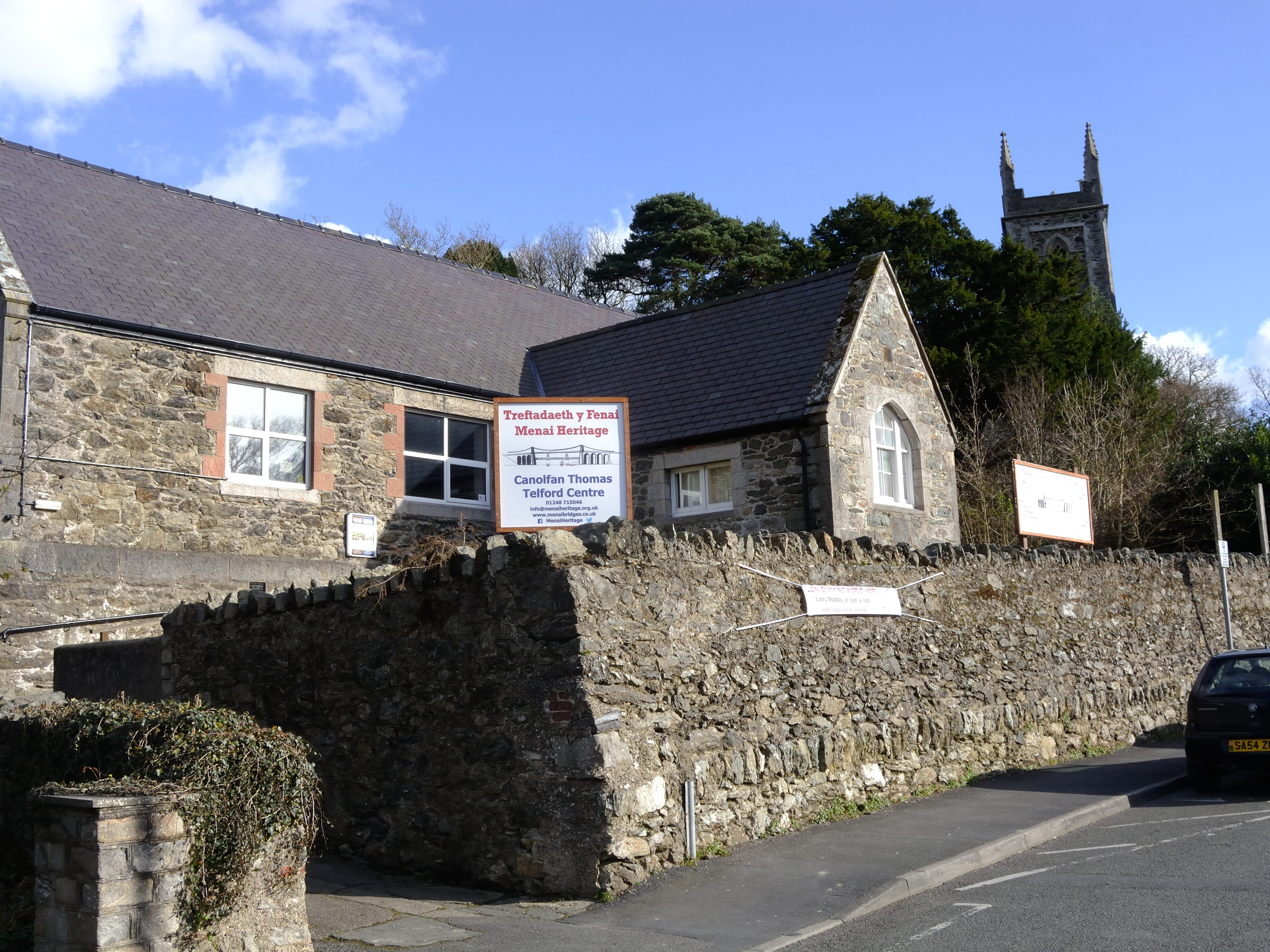
- Canolfan Thomas Telford Centre, Menai Bridge

- Location in Anglesey
- Established: 2007
- Location: Menai Bridge, Anglesey, North Wales
- Coordinates: 53.223731°N 4.165613°W
- Type: Local history and technology museum
- Public transit access: Bangor railway station (Wales) : 2 miles. Bus stops: Menai Suspension Bridge (NaPTAN Stop ID ynydagp) and Carreg y Borth (NaPTAN Stop ID ynydagm), 0.1 miles.
- Website: Menai Heritage

The Menai Heritage Bridges Exhibition is a museum based in the Canolfan Thomas Telford Centre in Menai Bridge, Anglesey, Wales. It is dedicated to the two bridges across the Menai Strait; the Menai Suspension Bridge and the Britannia Bridge, as well as the local history and natural history of the Menai Strait and the surrounding area

== History ==
The Canolfan Thomas Telford Centre is a former National school associated with the neighbouring St Mary's Church, both designed by well-known local architect Henry Kennedy. It was opened in 1854 as a simple rectangular building. In 1878 an extension was built to the back, a cloakroom was added in 1896, and the front porch in 1909. It continued to be used as a school until 1923, when the school merged with the council school. It was then used as a church hall until 2007.

In 2007 it was purchased and refurbished by the Menai Bridge Community Heritage Trust (also known as Menai Heritage), who named it in honour of Thomas Telford, the builder of the Menai Suspension Bridge. The Trust was formed in 1997 to preserve the historical and architectural heritage of Menai Bridge for the community. The building is now used as a community centre as well as home to Menai Heritage's Bridges Exhibition, a fully accredited museum.
