= Anatomy of a Poet =

Studio album by In the Nursery
- Released: June 1994
- Recorded: AXIS, Sheffield
- Genre: Electronica
- Label: Third Mind, ITN Corporation

Professional ratings
Review scores
Source	Rating
AllMusic	4.5/5 stars

Anatomy of a Poet (released June 1994) is the eighth studio album from the British electronica duo In the Nursery. It includes several tracks featuring samples of author Colin Wilson reading his favourite poetry. The album was released on CD only.

== Track listing ==
All tracks by Klive and Nigel Humberstone except where noted

1. "Bombed" – 5:50
2. "Anatomy of a Poet" – 4:34
3. "In Perpetuum" – 4:49
4. "Motive" – 3:37
5. "Hallucinations?" (dream world mix) – 4:36
6. "Blue Lovers" – 5:47
7. "Paper Desert" – 5:11
8. "Byzantium" – 3:24
9. "Seventh Seal" (Scott Engel) – 5:02
10. "The Golden Journey" – 4:32
11. "Touched with Fire" – 1:58
12. "Hallucinations? (The Tower III)" ("corp012" re-release) – 3:10
13. "November Trees" ("corp012" re-release) – 1:48
14. "Hallucinations? (A Sense of Reality)" ("corp012" re-release) – 8:10

== Samples ==
The following poetry features on the album. It was selected and read by Colin Wilson and recorded on location, Gorran Haven, Cornwall in December 1993.

- "Anatomy of a Poet" includes reading from "Cynara" by Ernest Dowson
- "Motive", includes reading from "The Harlot's House" by Oscar Wilde
- "Byzantium" includes reading from "(Sailing to) Byzantium" by W. B. Yeats
- "The Golden Journey" includes reading from "The Golden Journey to Samarkand" by James Elroy Flecker

== Personnel ==
- John Crossley – Remastering
- Jill Crowther – Oboe
- Dominike Duplaa – Design
- Stephen Harris – Producer
- In the Nursery – Producer
- Dolores C. Marguerite – Vocals
- Mark Murphy – Guitar
- Pete Stewart – Assistant Engineer
- Colin Wilson – Narrator, Engineer
