= Sense (In the Nursery album) =

Studio album by In the Nursery
- Released: October 1991
- Recorded: Axis Studios, Great Driffield, East Yorkshire
- Length: 46:06
- Label: Third Mind
- Producer: In the Nursery, Steve Harris

In the Nursery chronology
L'esprit (1990)	Sense (1991)	Duality (1992)

Professional ratings
Review scores
Source	Rating
Allmusic	3/5 stars

Sense is the fifth album by the English electronic music duo In the Nursery, released in 1991 through Third Mind Records.

== Track listing ==
All tracks are written by Klive Humberstone and Nigel Humberstone

No.	Title	Length
1.	"Blue Religion"	4:26
2.	"À Rebours"	4:13
3.	"Boy Behind the Curtain"	4:18
4.	"Temporis"	4:24
5.	"Syntonic"	4:01
6.	"Sense"	4:14
7.	"Epigraph"	4:06
8.	"Memoirs"	1:42
9.	"Angelchrome"	5:04
10.	"Sinistral"	3:04
11.	"Sense Datum"	3:17
12.	"Contre-Cœur"	3:16

== Personnel ==
In the Nursery

- Klive Humberstone – instruments
- Nigel Humberstone – instruments
- Q. – percussion
- Dolores Marguerite C – narration

Production and additional personnel

- In the Nursery – production
- Steve Harris – production
