= Asphalt (1929 film) =

1929 film directed by Joe May

- Directed by: Joe May
- Screenplay by: Joe May; Hans Székely; Rolf E. Vanloo
- Produced by: Max Pfeiffer; Erich Pommer
- Starring: Gustav Fröhlich; Betty Amann
- Cinematography: Günther Rittau
- Production company: Universum-Film AG
- Distributed by: UFA-Filmverleih GmbH
- Release date: 11 March 1929 (Berlin)
- Running time: 85 minutes
- Country: Germany

Asphalt is a 1929 German silent film directed by Joe May, starring Gustav Fröhlich and Betty Amann. The film was shot between October and December 1928 at UFA, and premiered on 11 March 1929 at the Ufa-Palast near Berlin Zoo. The film follows Else's attempts to seduce Albert, a traffic policeman, after he catches her trying to steal a precious stone. The film was initially banned for young audiences. It is considered to be one of the last great silent films produced by UFA.

== Plot ==
Asphalt (1929)

Young police sergeant Holk lives with his mother and father in a middle-class apartment. He serves as a traffic cop in a very lively and busy city where street crime is rampant: we see a woman's purse being stolen by pickpockets while she is looking at a special window display. Holk is flattered by a woman in a convertible: although she clearly violates the right of way at the intersection where he is directing traffic, thereby causing a traffic jam, he takes her personal details with obvious interest.

A young woman seeks detailed advice from a jeweller: she charms the jeweller, distracting him in order to steal a gemstone using a rigged umbrella. After the woman leaves the store, the jeweller's employees notice that a stone has been lost. The jeweller's son follows the woman and confronts her on the street; a crowd appears.

After the changing of the duty shift, on his way home Holk notices this commotion. To clarify the situation, he takes the woman and the jeweller's son to the jewellery store, where the woman is outraged by the accusations and insists on being immediate searched. The woman is led by a female employee into an adjoining room while Holk and the two men examine her handbag and fur muff. The stone is not discovered at first, and the woman is about to leave the jewellery store when the jeweller's son asks again for the umbrella to be examined. Holk notices the hidden stone.

The older jeweller is still taken with the young woman, who tearfully tells him that she stole the stone out of necessity and was inspired by a newspaper report about such a theft. The jeweller asks the police officer to decline prosecution, since the store has not been harmed. Holk points to his status as a civil servant and arrests the woman for jewellery theft. As she is driven away in a police car, the two street thieves mock her, emphasising the difference between "old professionals and a novice."

In the police car, the woman tearfully tries to evoke sympathy from Holk: she declares her rent is in arrears, she is facing eviction from her apartment, and her fear of homelessness. Arriving at the police station, she begs the police officer to at least let her get her papers from the nearby apartment. He is persuaded when she suggests that he accompany her to her apartment. There, Else seduces Holk using her allure.

Holk weakens, drops the charges against her, and releases her. He soon bitterly regrets this decision. Holk quickly falls for the beautiful stranger and visits her again the next day. Else confesses to him that her boyfriend is a wanted criminal. Suddenly, this man, pompously calling himself Konsul Langen, arrives and attacks the sergeant. In the ensuing scuffle, Holk knocks the villain down so badly that he is killed.

Holk confesses the fatal accident to his father, a veteran police sergeant major. Declaring that "the law is the law", his sense of duty compels him to arrest Holk junior, his own son, now suspected of murder. However, Else's conscience takes over. She turns herself in to the police and confirms young Holk's version that he acted in self-defence. Else, who has since fallen in love with Sergeant Holk, confirms the identity of her criminal ex-lover and is subsequently arrested as his accomplice and charged. Holk regains his freedom, and says he will wait for her.

== Cast ==
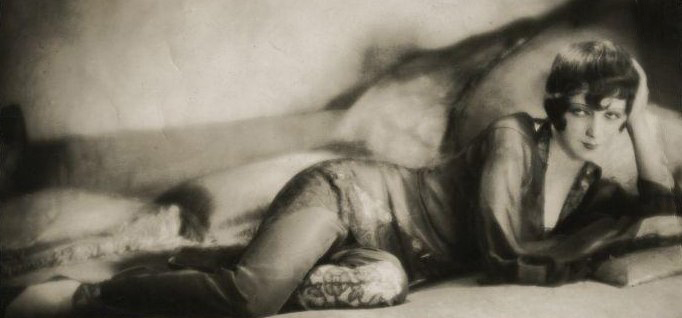
Betty Amann as Else Kramer

- Albert Steinrück as Hauptwachtmeister Holk
- Else Heller as Frau Holk
- Gustav Fröhlich as Wachtmeister Albert Holk
- Betty Amann as Else Kramer
- Hans Adalbert Schlettow as Konsul Langen
- Rosa Valetti as Frau an der Theke
- Kurt Vespermann as Curt Vesperman
- Hans Albers as the first thief

== Production ==
Asphalt was made by UFA, one of Germany's most prestigious film studios. It was shot between October and December 1928. With the exception of a few cleverly edited live-action shots, the street scenes were filmed at the UFA Studios in Neubabelsberg. It was subtitled The Police Sergeant and the Diamond Else.

The set streets consisted of wooden structures under artificial light. The buildings for Asphalt were designed by Erich Kettelhut, and the costumes were designed by René Hubert.

Asphalt was one of the last silent films, alongside Fritz Lang's Woman in the Moon, to have been partly filmed in Babelsberg.

This was the last fully completed film role for Albert Steinrück, who plays the dutiful father. He did not live to see the premiere of the film.

== Release ==
Asphalt was distributed theatrically by UFA-Filmverleih GmbH and premiered in Berlin at the Ufa-Palast am Zoo on 11 March 1929.

Its first screening after the war took place on 26 June 1973, on ZDF. An FSK rating on 31 May 1995 (No. 72660) resulted in an all-ages rating and a public holiday rating.

Asphalt was originally only available in a shortened version with English-language intertitles. In 1993, the Stiftung Deutsche Kinemathek in Berlin discovered a print of Asphalt at the Gosfilmofond archive in Moscow which seemed to have been sourced from the original film negative. The chronology of scenes in the print differed from earlier versions and included extra scenes with German intertitles. The newly discovered version of the film was released on DVD by the Masters of Cinema on 11 April 2005 with a score by Karl-Ernst Sasse. Kino Video released the film on DVD again on 18 July 2006.

In 1997, the British duo In the Nursery released their own soundtrack to the film as part of their Optical Music Series.

== Reception ==
Siegfried Kracauer's From Caligari to Hitler (1947) highlights the visual use of asphalt, pavement, and road motifs in "street films" of the time, and especially in Asphalt: "The opening credits of this film illustrate, in the style of a documentary, how asphalt is manufactured and how it greedily devours the open countryside to pave the way for city traffic—this thunderous chaos that […] is mastered by the magical gestures of the policeman. Shots that emphasise the unity of asphalt and traffic also form the closing credits for the actual plot. The emphasis placed on the asphalt goes hand-in-hand with insertions of street images at every dramatic climax."

Kay Weniger's Es wird im Leben dir mehr nehmen als geben (In Life You Are More Taken Than Given) states that May's Asphalt was "his most socially committed film and, for critics, the highest-quality May production. Asphalt was convincing as an intelligently crafted social piece from the Berlin common-people milieu, somewhat in the tradition of Zille, Jutzi, and Döblin."

The Lexikon des Internationales Films observes: "The French film historian Charles Ford described this film as the 'first example of German realism.' […] A silent melodrama that loses its sensational character through convincing performances and outstanding camerawork."

Reclams Film-Führer notes: "Better than the somewhat clunky 'bourgeois tragedy' with a happy ending, the film succeeds in capturing peripheral observations, street scenes, and the portrayal of quirky characters. The cinematography also deserves attention."

Buchers Enzyklopädie des Films claims that Asphalt shows "a superficial influence of both Expressionism and street films."

In the film guide German Feature Films from the Beginnings to 1933, Michael Hanisch writes euphorically: "The high technical mastery of the director and his cameraman is evident in the film. Günther Rittau's lighting design, the liveliness of the scenes, the art of editing, the performance of the actors, who were able to express with a single gesture, a single movement of the mouth, what their colleagues needed several sentences to do a few months later, in the dawning era of sound films – all this identifies Asphalt as a work of art that documents the high art of silent film in its final phase."

Fritz Walter, writing in the Berliner Börsen-Courier found the films theme of the conflict between duty and love to be "the banality of the film script". Lotte Eisner related to this statement, writing in 1965 that "Within this insipid plot Joe May occasionally remembers his artistic ambitions. Then we get the high-angle shot of the street where the young Fröhlich, the Führer of the crossroads, on duty as a policeman, dominates the traffic—a shot in which the German taste for ordered ornamentation comes through yet again". Critic Siegfried Kracauers's review in Frankfurter Zeitung conversely commented that May "has all the finesse of his craft, he accomplishes all that he wants to. There are few prose writers that can convey the posh couple’s taxi ride as tightly as he does. Similarly, the wide shots are used and sustained with enormous strength of style, and the roaming camera is extremely skilled in the way it reveals human co-existence and spaces".

In a list of the 100 most important German films, compiled in 1994 by the Association of German Cinémathèques, Asphalt was placed at no. 86.
