= Haunted Dancehall =

Studio album by The Sabres of Paradise
- Released: 28 November 1994
- Studios: Sabresonic; Orinoco
- Genre: Techno
- Length: 76:49
- Label: Warp
- Producers: Andrew Weatherall; Jagz Kooner; Gary Burns; Portishead; Scruff

The Sabres of Paradise chronology
Sabresonic (1993)	Haunted Dancehall (1994)	Sabresonic II (1995)

Singles from Haunted Dancehall
- 1. "Theme" Released: 1994; 2. "Wilmot" Released: 1994

Haunted Dancehall is the second studio album by English electronic music group The Sabres of Paradise. It was released through Warp on 28 November 1994. It peaked at number 57 on the UK Albums Chart.

== Critical reception ==
Professional ratings
Review scores
Source	Rating
AllMusic	5/5 stars
The Guardian	4/4 stars
Music Week	4/5 stars

NME named Haunted Dancehall the 47th best album of 1994. In 2007, Haunted Dancehall was included in The Guardian's list of "1000 albums to hear before you die", with an accompanying write-up citing it as "techno's first concept album". It was also included in the book 1001 Albums You Must Hear Before You Die. In 2026, Joe Muggs, writing for DJ Mag, stated the album "captured the ’90s post-rave landscape".

== Track listing ==
All tracks are written by Andrew Weatherall, Jagz Kooner, and Gary Burns.

No.	Title	Length
1.	"Bubble and Slide"	2:39
2.	"Bubble and Slide II"	7:38
3.	"Duke of Earlsfield"	8:42
4.	"Flight Path Estate"	3:21
5.	"Planet D" (Portishead Remix)	4:41
6.	"Wilmot"	7:32
7.	"Tow Truck"	6:35
8.	"Theme"	4:48
9.	"Theme 4"	1:55
10.	"Return to Planet D"	5:04
11.	"Ballad of Nicky McGuire"	8:30
12.	"Jacob Street 7AM"	3:46
13.	"Chapel Street Market 9AM"	7:14
14.	"Haunted Dancehall"	4:25
Total length:		76:49

== Personnel ==
Credits adapted from liner notes.

- Andrew Weatherall – production, mixing
- Jagz Kooner – production, mixing
- Gary Burns – production, mixing
- Portishead – additional production (5)
- Scruff – additional production (6)
- MadArk – artwork

== Charts ==
Chart (1994)	Peak position
Scottish Albums (Official Charts)	90
UK Albums (Official Charts)	57
