= Twins (In the Nursery album) =

Studio album by In the Nursery
- Released: September 1986
- Recorded: March 1986
- Studio: Flexible Response (Bradford)
- Genre: Neoclassical dark wave; martial industrial
- Length: 48:32
- Label: Sweatbox
- Producer: In the Nursery; SNAKE

In the Nursery chronology
Twins (1986)	Stormhorse (1987)

Twins is the debut studio album by the English neoclassical dark wave and martial industrial band In the Nursery, released in September 1986 by Sweatbox Records.

== Critical reception ==
Professional ratings
Review scores
Source	Rating
AllMusic	4/5 stars

In a retrospective review for AllMusic, critic Ned Raggett wrote of the album, "the Humberstones take a notable step forward from rock aesthetics to a much more elaborate, involved kind of music", concluding that "Twins remains an underrated, fascinating album."

== Track listing ==
All tracks are written by Klive Humberstone and Nigel Humberstone.

Side one
No.	Title	Length
1.	"Timbre"	1:35
2.	"Twins"	4:55
3.	"Workcorps"	4:49
4.	"Profile 63"	3:27
5.	"Huntdown"	4:27

Side two
No.	Title	Length
6.	"The Outsider"	3:50
7.	"Judgement of Paris"	4:35
8.	"Joaquin"	3:23
9.	"+"	2:32
10.	"Intertwine"	2:18

CD bonus tracks (Temper 12")
No.	Title	Length
11.	"Breach Birth"	6:34
12.	"Arm Me Audacity"	3:38
13.	"Butyrki"	2:29

== Personnel ==
Credits are adapted from the Twins liner notes.

In the Nursery

- Gus Ferguson – cello
- Klive Humberstone – instruments, vocals
- Nigel Humberstone – instruments, vocals
- Elaine McLeod – vocals

Production and artwork

- Chris Bigg – design
- Mark Estdale – engineering
- In the Nursery – production
- Nimbus – mastering
- SNAKE – production
- Bill Stephenson – photography
