= Operation Menai Bridge =

Plan following the death of King Charles III

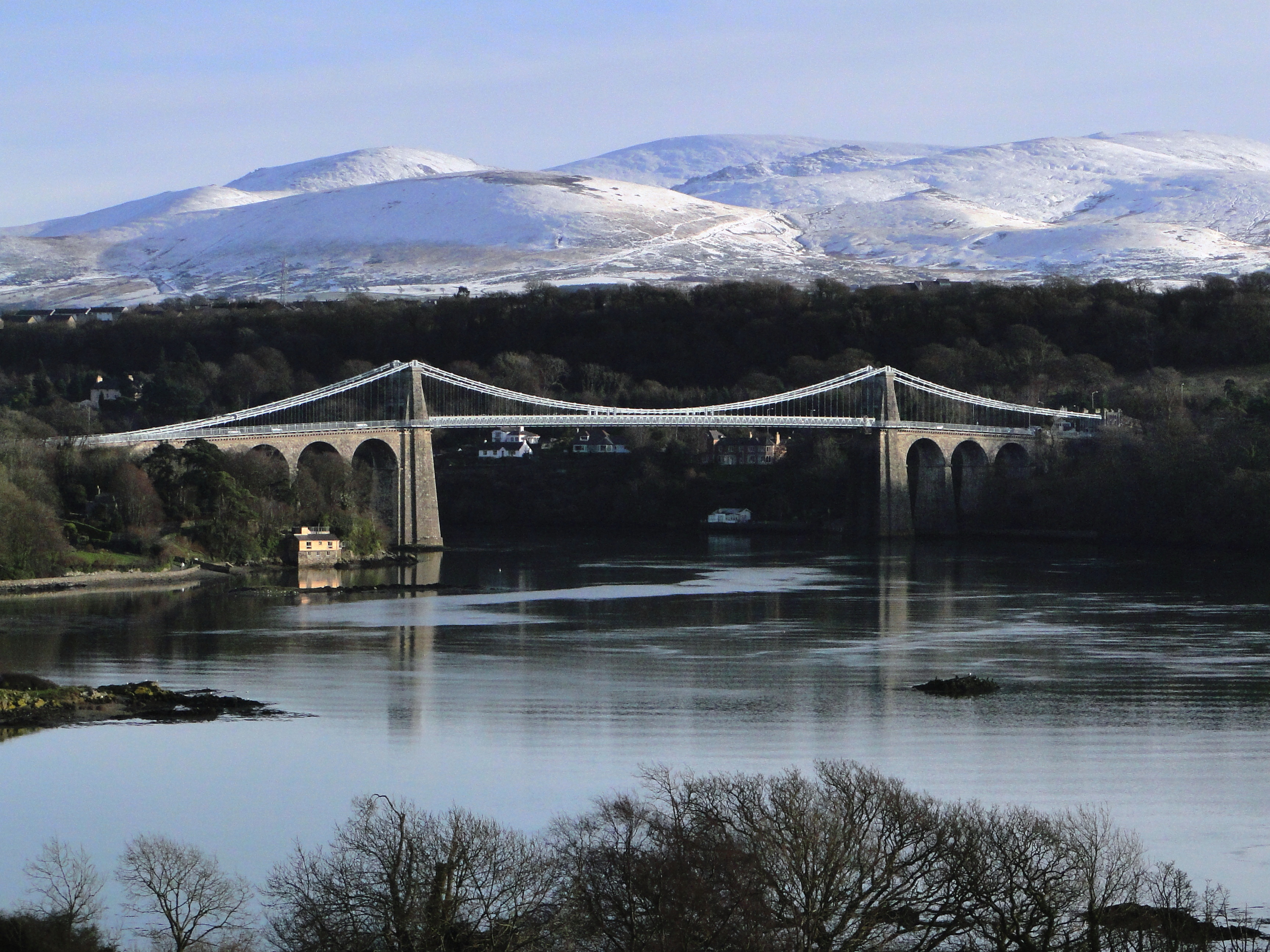
Menai Suspension Bridge (pictured in 2009), the plan's namesake

Operation Menai Bridge is the code name for plans related to the death of King Charles III. The name refers to a suspension bridge in Wales. The plan includes the announcement of his death, the period of official mourning, and the details of his state funeral. Planning for the King's funeral began almost immediately after Charles's accession to the throne upon the death of his mother and predecessor, Queen Elizabeth II.

== Background ==
The death of King George VI was communicated by using the phrase "Hyde Park Corner", to prevent Buckingham Palace switchboard operators from learning the news too soon. For Queen Elizabeth the Queen Mother, Operation Tay Bridge was put into motion upon her death. Other code names used were Operation Forth Bridge for Prince Philip, Duke of Edinburgh, and Operation London Bridge for Queen Elizabeth II. Since the latter died at Balmoral Castle in Scotland, Operation Unicorn was also put into effect upon her death.

== Post-accession ==
Following the accession of Charles III, planning for his funeral began "in earnest" on 20 September 2022, the day after the Queen's state funeral. As of 2024, details of Operation Menai Bridge continued to be regularly updated and reviewed, in light of Charles's diagnosis with cancer earlier that year.
