= Köda =

Studio album by In the Nursery
- Released: November 1988
- Recorded: April 1988 at The Slaughterhouse Recording Studios, Great Driffield, East Yorkshire
- Genre: Neoclassical Dark Wave, Martial industrial
- Length: 46:23
- Label: Wax Trax!
- Producer: In the Nursery, Colin Richardson

In the Nursery chronology
Stormhorse (1987)	Köda (1988)	Counterpoint (1989)

Professional ratings
Review scores
Source	Rating
Allmusic	4/5 stars

Köda is the third album by In the Nursery, released in 1988 through Wax Trax! Records.

== Track listing ==
All tracks are written by Klive Humberstone and Nigel Humberstone

No.	Title	Length
1.	"Rites"	3:39
2.	"Maidens"	0:57
3.	"Te Deum"	3:09
4.	"Triumph"	1:15
5.	"Burnished Days"	2:22
6.	"Ascent"	7:06
7.	"Scherzo"	6:18
8.	"Guarded Rites"	2:47
9.	"Suspire"	1:54
10.	"Kotow"	2:07
11.	"The Seventeenth Parallel"	6:19

CD bonus tracks (The Compulsion 12")
No.	Title	Length
12.	"Compulsion"	4:00
13.	"Libertaire"	4:30

== Personnel ==
In the Nursery

- Klive Humberstone – instruments
- Nigel Humberstone – instruments
- Q. – percussion
- Dolores Marguerite C – narration

Production and additional personnel

- Chris Bigg – design
- In the Nursery – production
- Brian Pitkin – photography
- Colin Richardson – production
