= Operation London Bridge =

Plan following the death of Queen Elizabeth II

Operation London Bridge was the funeral plan for Queen Elizabeth II. The plan included the announcement of her death, the period of official mourning, and the details of her state funeral. The plan was created as early as the 1960s and revised many times in the years before her death in September 2022.

The phrase "London Bridge is down" was used to communicate the death of the Queen to the prime minister of the United Kingdom and key personnel, setting the plan into motion. Bodies involved in preparing the plan included various government departments, the Church of England, Metropolitan Police Service, the British Armed Forces, the media, the Royal Parks, London boroughs, the Greater London Authority and Transport for London. Some critical decisions relating to the plan were made by the Queen herself, while some were left to be determined by her successor. Reporting on the preparations, The Guardian described them as "planned to the minute" with "arcane and highly specific" details.

Several other plans were also created to support the implementation of Operation London Bridge, such as Operation Unicorn—the plan that detailed what was to happen if the Queen were to die in Scotland. Running concurrently with Operation London Bridge were operations concerning King Charles III's accession to the throne and coronation. Several Commonwealth realms developed their own plans for how to react to the death of the Queen.

== History ==
Funerals and coronations of members of the British royal family are typically organised by the Earl Marshal and the officers in the College of Arms. Preparations for Elizabeth II's death and funeral had also been made by the Cabinet Office.

Pre-determined phrases have typically been used as "codenames" for plans relating to the death and funeral of a royal family member. Initially, codenames were used by key officials in an effort to prevent switchboard operators of Buckingham Palace from learning of the death prior to a public announcement. When King George VI died in 1952, key government officials were informed with the phrase "Hyde Park Corner".

Several codenamed funeral plans for royal family members in the late-20th and early-21st centuries have used the names of prominent bridges in the United Kingdom. Operation Tay Bridge was the phrase used for the death and funeral plans of Queen Elizabeth The Queen Mother, which was rehearsed for 22 years before its eventual use in 2002. The funeral of Diana, Princess of Wales in 1997 was also modelled after Operation Tay Bridge. As of March 2017, the phrase Operation Forth Bridge referred to the death and funeral of Prince Philip, Duke of Edinburgh, who died in 2021. The funeral arrangements for Charles III used several different codenames during his lifetime, before being renamed Operation Menai Bridge. All coded operations for members of the royal family, including the plan for Elizabeth II, form a part of Operation Lion, an overarching plan for any royal death. The operation and the coded phrase for Elizabeth II's death was first made public in a 2017 Guardian article.

A 2024 biography of Charles III by Robert Hardman claimed the King's funeral arrangements have "been upgraded to Operation London Bridge, mirroring those of Elizabeth II". Planning for Charles III's funeral arrangement began shortly after his coronation held in 2023. The biography also claims that the codename Operation Menai Bridge was used for William, Prince of Wales, replacing the codename previously used, Operation Clare Bridge.

== Plan ==
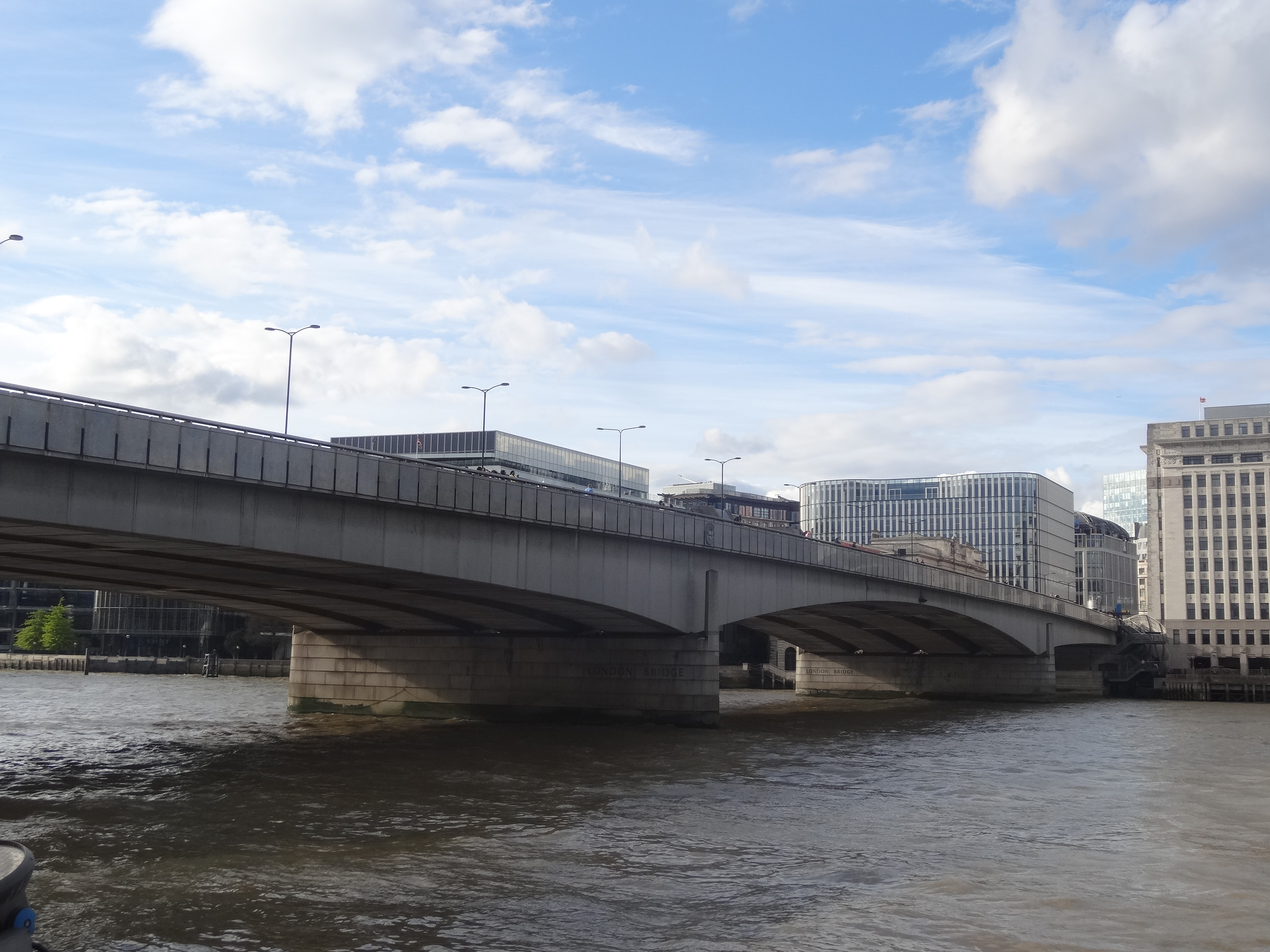
London Bridge (pictured in 2017), the plan's namesake

Preparations for Queen Elizabeth II's death and funeral date back to the 1960s, with the plan having undergone multiple changes in the decades since. The plan was updated three times a year through a meeting involving government department officials, the police, and broadcasters. The plan that outlines the process between the death of the Queen and her funeral was codenamed Operation London Bridge.

On the death of the Queen, her private secretary would be the first official (i.e., not one of her relatives or part of a medical team) to convey the news. Their first act would be to contact the prime minister, where civil servants would convey the code phrase "London Bridge is down" to the prime minister using secure telephone lines. The cabinet secretary and the Privy Council Office would also be informed by the private secretary. The cabinet secretary would then convey the news to ministers and senior civil servants. The Foreign, Commonwealth and Development Office's Global Response Centre, based at a secret location in London, would communicate the news to the governments of the fourteen other countries of which Elizabeth was queen (the Commonwealth realms), and to the governments of the other countries of the Commonwealth of Nations. Government websites and social media accounts, as well as the royal family's website, would turn black, and publication of non-urgent content would be avoided.

The media would be informed by announcement to PA Media and the BBC through the Radio Alert Transmission System (RATS) and to commercial radio on the Independent Radio News through a network of blue "obit lights" which would alert presenters to play "inoffensive music" and prepare for a news flash, while BBC Two would suspend scheduled programming and switch to BBC One's broadcast of the announcement. BBC News would air a pre-recorded sequence of portraits, during which the presenters on duty at the time would prepare for the formal announcement by putting on dark clothing prepared for this purpose. The Guardian reported that The Times had 11 days of prepared coverage ready and that ITN and Sky News had long rehearsed her death, substituting the name "Mrs Robinson" for the Queen's.

A footman would pin a dark-edged notice to the gates of Buckingham Palace. At the same time, the palace website would display the same notice. The Parliament of the United Kingdom and the Scottish, Welsh and Northern Irish parliaments would meet as soon as is practical or be recalled if they are not sitting. The prime minister would address the House of Commons. The new monarch would host a meeting with the prime minister and then deliver a speech to the nation at 6 pm, the evening following the Queen's death. Whitehall and local government buildings would fly flags at half-mast and books of condolence may be opened; in some places local conventions may be specified, for example in many cases ceremonial ornaments, such as ceremonial maces or council chains, would be covered with a black purse or tied with a black ribbon. Such practices are not universally followed. Gun salutes would take place at saluting stations and a service of remembrance, to be attended by the prime minister and senior ministers, would be held at St Paul's Cathedral.

Ten days after the Queen's death, a state funeral led by the Archbishop of Canterbury would be held at Westminster Abbey. A funeral procession was also planned, with the Queen deciding on the order of the procession. A two minutes' silence would take place across the United Kingdom at midday and processions would gather in London and Windsor. Her body would then be buried in a prepared tomb at King George VI Memorial Chapel in St George's Chapel, Windsor Castle, alongside Prince Philip, Duke of Edinburgh, whose coffin would be moved from the Royal Vault. A committal service would be held at St George's Chapel before the burial. As agreed by the Queen and the prime minister, the day of the funeral would be declared a day of national mourning, although a bank holiday would not be granted.

=== Supporting operations ===
Operation London Bridge included several ancillary and supporting plans, such as the plans for the arrangements at Westminster Hall. This includes Operation Marquee, a plan that covers the ceremonial, service and vigil aspects of the Queen's lying-in-state inside Westminster Hall; and Operation Feather, which concerns the logistical details with the public outside of the building.

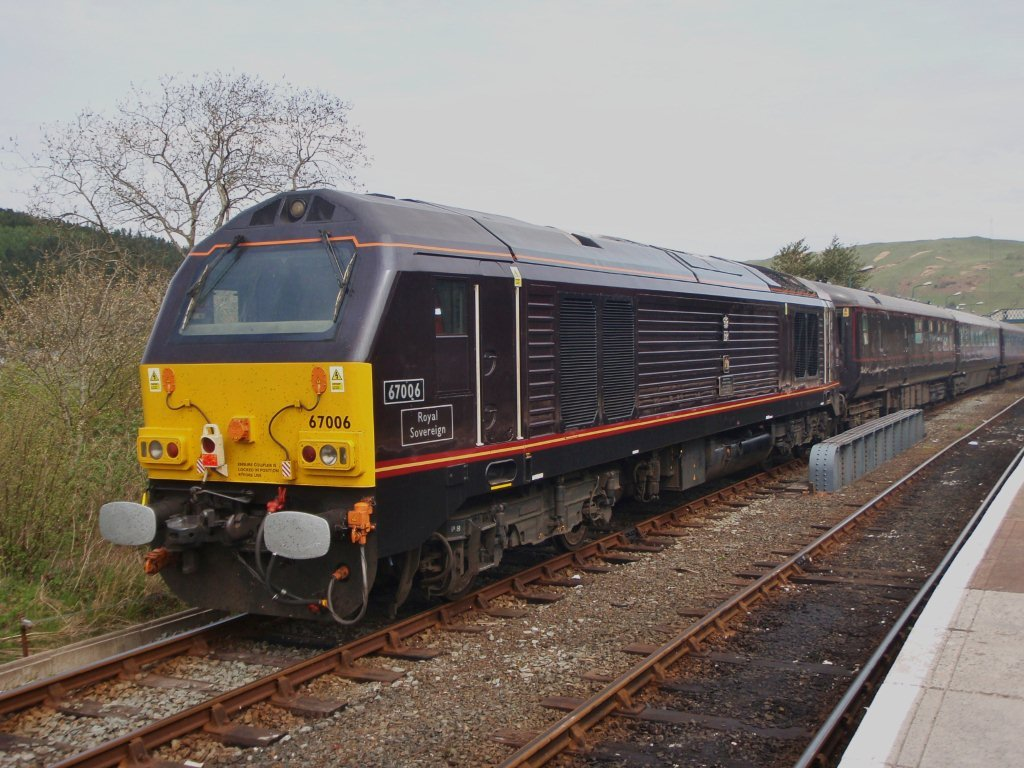

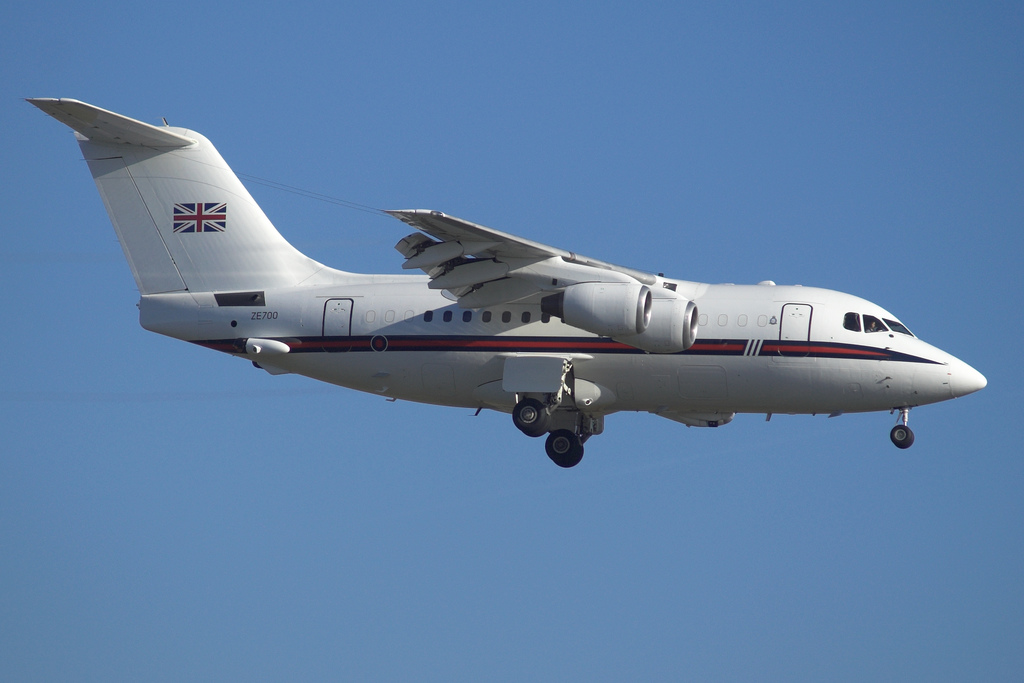
The British Royal Train and The Royal Squadron's former BAe 146 CC2

Several plans were also created that outlined the arrangements for moving the Queen's coffin, depending on where she died. In the event she had died at Windsor Castle or Sandringham House, the coffin would have been taken by Royal Train to St Pancras railway station in London, where the prime minister and cabinet ministers would be waiting. Had the Queen died outside the UK, "Operation Overstudy" provided that her coffin would have been flown to RAF Northolt by the RAF's Air Mobility Force.

In every scenario, the coffin, upon its arrival in London, would be transported by hearse to Buckingham Palace where it would rest in the Throne Room. Five days after the Queen's death, the coffin would have been moved to Westminster Hall and, after a service, the Queen would lie in state for three days.

==== Operation Unicorn ====
Were the death of the Queen to occur in Scotland, "Operation Unicorn" called for the Palace of Holyroodhouse, St Giles' Cathedral in Edinburgh, and the Scottish Parliament to serve as the focal point of gatherings, with a condolence book open to the public at the latter location. Parliamentary business would be suspended immediately for at least six parliamentary days, to allow authorities to prepare for the funeral. The parliament would then prepare a motion of condolence within 72 hours of reconvening. The Queen's coffin would first lie in repose at the Palace of Holyroodhouse, followed by a service of reception at St Giles' Cathedral. Following this the coffin would be transported to Waverley station and taken by the Royal Train to London, if possible. Otherwise, the coffin would be taken by aeroplane to London, and received by the prime minister and cabinet ministers; this was part of Operation Overstudy.

=== Related operations ===
The plans for the event of the Queen's death and funeral would occur concurrently with other related plans, including the plans for the ceremonial accession of King Charles III to the throne, Operation Spring Tide, and his coronation plans, Operation Golden Orb.

==== Operation Spring Tide ====
The Queen's death and funeral plans worked concurrently with Operation Spring Tide, the plan for the accession of Charles III to the throne. One day after the Queen's death, the Accession Council would meet at St James's Palace and Charles would be proclaimed king. Parliament would meet that evening when MPs would swear allegiance to Charles III and express condolences for the Queen's death. Most parliamentary activities would then be suspended for 10 days. At 3:30 p.m., Charles III would host the prime minister and the cabinet for an audience. Two days after the Queen's death, proclamations for the King would be made by the Scottish, Welsh and Northern Irish administrations.

On the third day after the Queen's death, Charles III would receive the motion of condolence at Westminster Hall in the morning and then depart for a tour of the United Kingdom. Charles III would visit the Scottish parliament and attend a service at St Giles' Cathedral in Edinburgh. On the next day, Charles III would visit Northern Ireland, where he would receive a motion of condolence at Hillsborough Castle and attend a service at St Anne's Cathedral, Belfast. Seven days after the Queen's death, Charles III would visit Wales, receiving a motion of condolence at the Welsh parliament and attending a service at Llandaff Cathedral in Cardiff.

Supporting plans exist within Operations Spring Tide for specific arrangements in each constituent country in the UK; including Operation Shamrock for Northern Ireland, Operation Kingfisher for Scotland, and Operation Dragon for Wales.

== Implementation ==
Operation London Bridge and Operation Unicorn were activated upon the death of Elizabeth II, which occurred on 8 September 2022 at Balmoral Castle in Scotland.

Although the operation was intended to be brought into action on the day that Elizabeth II died (identified in the plan as "D-day"), the late time of her death rendered it inconvenient to convene the accession council at short notice. The decision was taken to designate the following day, 9 September as D-day. This also avoided the problem of the funeral (on D+10) taking place on a Sunday. Many leaders from around the world attended her funeral, leading to thousands of police officers being called for their protection.

In a change from the reported plan, Charles III announced upon his proclamation that the day of the Queen's funeral would be a bank holiday.

Although the Queen did not die overseas, an aeroplane—an RAF C-17 Globemaster—was used to transport the coffin to London. This decision was taken on security grounds, as it would be too difficult to police the entire rail route. Police were deployed in key areas in Scotland to maintain security for the royal family and the Queen's body as it moved to Edinburgh Airport. There were 13 arrests made for the duration of the operation in Scotland.

== Corresponding plans ==
Officials from Buckingham Palace and Clarence House, known as the Inter-Realm Working Group, would brief representatives of the Commonwealth realms about the funeral and succession plans surrounding Operation London Bridge. The governments of the Commonwealth realms were informed of the monarch's death from the Foreign, Commonwealth and Development Office's Global Response Centre. These realms had devised their own plans for what happened in their respective countries in the days after Elizabeth II's death, which ran concurrently with Operation London Bridge.

=== Australia ===
Preparations were made in Australia for the death of the Queen, with statements having been already drafted for the prime minister and governor-general of Australia.

The prime minister would be informed of the Queen's death approximately an hour prior to its formal announcement. The prime minister was to wear a black tie immediately after its announcement, with the staff of recent past prime ministers having carried a black tie in preparation for the news. The prime minister and governor-general would then return to Canberra to make their statements before departing for London with the Royal Australian Air Force. If not scheduled to sit, the Parliament would be recalled to meet to pass a condolence motion. Plans had the governor-general issuing the Australian proclamation for the accession of King Charles III and his Australian titles at an appropriate ceremony.

A flag notice was issued instructing flags to fly at half-mast immediately for the next ten days, except on the day the accession of Charles III is proclaimed. Part of Australia's response would include a national day of commemoration, which may be declared a public holiday. A state funeral and special Anglican service would be held. The Australian Defence Force organised several gun salutes coinciding with events in London and participated in ceremonies in the United Kingdom.

The Australian High Commissioner to the United Kingdom would observe the Accession Council. In addition, Australian members of the Privy Council of the United Kingdom are entitled to sit on the Accession Council. As reported by The Australian in June 2022, four official Australian state guests were expected to attend the funeral in London, with an additional 12 Australians also being invited.

=== Canada ===
In Canada, preparations were made as early as 2002, during Queen Elizabeth II's Golden Jubilee. Consultations over the plans have been made with the Canadian Armed Forces, the Canadian Privy Council Office, the Canadian secretary to the Queen, the Department of Canadian Heritage, the office of the governor general of Canada, and the office of the Earl Marshal in the United Kingdom. The federal government's planning for the death of the Queen was somewhat reliant on what was outlined in the Manual of Official Procedure of the Government of Canada, a document produced by the Privy Council Office in 1968. In addition to the federal government, provincial governments have also implemented their own contingency plans for the death of the Queen, and the accession of Charles III.

After receiving the news about the Queen's death, the governor general would recall the Cabinet to Parliament Hill and proclaim that Canada has a new "lawful and rightful liege". The Privy Council for Canada had convened to proclaim Charles III in Canada. The Manual of Official Procedure of the Government of Canada states the prime minister is responsible for convening the Parliament, tabling a resolution of loyalty and condolence from the Parliament to the next monarch of Canada, and arranging for the motion to be seconded by the leader of the Official Opposition. The Prime Minister would then move to adjourn Parliament. The Canadian High Commissioner to the United Kingdom would be expected to represent Canada at the Accession Council.

An official mourning period for Elizabeth II would take place, the length of said period to be determined by the federal government; and issued by the governor general and the Department of Canadian Heritage. During the mourning period, a national memorial parade and service would be held in Ottawa. Additionally, ceremonial maces, portraits of the Queen, and flagpoles at Government Houses across Canada were draped in black fabric. A book of condolences was to be laid out near the front entrance of the Government Houses, with previously planned events cancelled. The death of the sovereign is considered a mandatory half-masting event for the Canadian government. Flags on all federal buildings and establishments in Canada and abroad would be flown at half-mast from the notification of death until sunset on the day of the funeral or memorial service.

Specific attire would be worn during the official mourning period. All staff of the governor general, provincial lieutenant governors, and territorial commissioners would be immediately issued black ties and black armbands. Other government officials would also wear a black armband. However, some legislative employees were obliged to wear additional attire during the official mourning period. This includes the sergeants-at-arms, who were required to wear black gloves, piqué bow ties, and carry a black scabbard and sword; and pages, who were required to wear black cravats, armbands, and ribbons.

The Canadian Broadcasting Corporation (CBC) maintained a regularly updated plan for the death of the sovereign, which was considered a "Broadcast of National Importance". Regular programming would be cancelled, advertisements were to be halted, and all CBC television and radio stations would shift to a 24-hour news format. The CBC also had a specially picked squad of broadcasters on call to come to the news desk at the time of the sovereign's death.

Plans for the Royal Canadian Mounted Police (RCMP) to participate in the funeral procession in London were in place for decades. Originally, the Crown Equerry had planned for the RCMP to use horses from the Household Cavalry. However, the plans were altered to have the RCMP use four horses they gifted to the Queen, after the RCMP had submitted a formal request to do so in 2021.

=== New Zealand ===
In New Zealand, the Cabinet Office of the Department of the Prime Minister and Cabinet was responsible for planning the arrangements in response to the demise of the Crown.

New Zealand was to receive the news of Queen Elizabeth II's death via established communication channels between the Royal Household and New Zealand. Once informed, the head of the Ministry for Culture and Heritage had to request the flying of the flag of New Zealand at half-mast on government buildings and other chosen facilities up to the day of the funeral, excluding the date the new sovereign is proclaimed. Twenty-one gun salutes would also be ordered "at appropriate times". A state memorial service would be expected, although decisions on accompanying events, as well as government protocol, would be determined by the prime minister. New Zealand Defence Force personnel would participate in overseas ceremonies.

Radio New Zealand (RNZ), the state-radio broadcaster, prepared a set of guidelines and instructions regarding the death of the monarch of New Zealand. Across all RNZ stations, broadcasters would break into regular programming to announce the death of the Queen, with rolling coverage. RNZ stations were prohibited from playing punk music, or songs by the band Queen during this period.

== See also ==
- Operation Hope Not, funeral plan for Sir Winston Churchill
- State funerals in the United Kingdom
- Operation Menai Bridge, funeral plan for King Charles III
